= Sister Margaret =

Sister Margaret may refer to:

- Sister Margaret Farley (21st century), American Roman Catholic nun
- Sister Margaret Sinclair (1900-1925), Scottish Roman Catholic nun
- Sister Margaret McKenna (born 1940), American Medical Mission Sister
