= Eileen Niedfield =

American physician and Catholic nun (1920–2007)

Mary Frederic Niedfield MMS
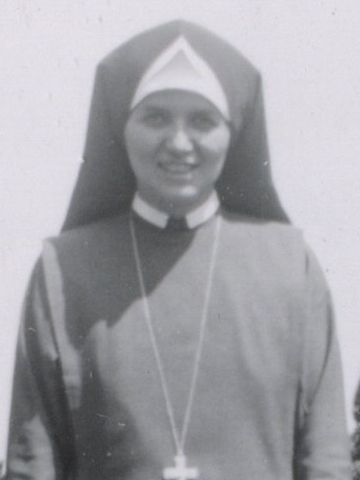

Personal life
- Born: Eileen Rae Niedfield; June 16, 1920 Manhattan, New York, U.S.
- Died: March 19, 2007 (aged 86) Orange, California, U.S.
- Education: Georgetown University School of Medicine

Religious life
- Religion: Christianity
- Denomination: Catholicism
- Order: Medical Mission Sisters

Eileen Rae Niedfield (June 16, 1920 – March 19, 2007), also known by her religious name Mary Frederic Niedfield MMS, was an American surgeon, general physician, and religious sister of the Medical Mission Sisters. She worked for nearly 40 years in India and for two years in Bhutan. Niedfield was in the first cohort of Georgetown University Medical School alumni that included women, graduating in 1951 as valedictorian and with the highest national board grades in pathology in the United States.

In her work in India and Bhutan from 1955 to 1992, she served many Muslim women whose husbands and fathers would not allow them to be treated by male doctors. Some of the postings were remote, where people otherwise had no access to medical care. Her work brought her to the attention of Mother Teresa, whose nursing sisters shared training and facilities with her congregation.

When she returned to the United States in 1992, Niedfield moved to San Diego to serve HIV/AIDS patients because she believed the need was great. She also carried out part-time volunteer work at St. Vincent de Paul Village-Joan Kroc Medical Clinic for individuals experiencing homelessness.

== Early life and education ==
Eileen Rae Niedfield was born in Manhattan, New York, on June 16, 1920, the eldest daughter of Alma Marie Thor Niedfield and Joseph Henry Niedfield. She attended St. Savior Parish Elementary School of Brooklyn, graduating in 1933. She then continued in its middle and high school, and founded the Action newspaper, later called Salvator and Skyline, in 1939 with one of the teachers who was a Catholic sister. They also worked together on the first sodality (a group founded to promote the spiritual works of mercy and corporal works of mercy) at St. Savior; Niedfield was elected its first prefect.

In 1938, she began university study at Manhattanville College, run by the Society of the Sacred Heart/RSCJ. She played field hockey, and co-wrote a play that was presented in November. During her first semester of college, she attended a speech by Mother Anna Maria Dengel, a medical doctor who had founded the Medical Mission Sisters of Philadelphia (MMS) in 1925. Niedfield was so impressed she left college after her first semester to enter the MMS as a postulant on February 11, 1939. She took vows and became Sister Mary Frederic, making her first public vows on August 15, 1941.

She then transferred to Trinity College in Washington, DC (now Trinity Washington University), graduating with a Bachelor of Science degree in chemistry, magna cum laude (high honors) in 1945. Niedfield took her perpetual vows on August 15, 1945, and her final vows a year later on August 15, 1946. After college she spent a year studying X-ray technology. She then spent six months at a Catholic clinic in Atlanta that served Black patients (all medical facilities were segregated in those years). It was then known as the Catholic Colored Clinic in Atlanta, and later as Southwest Atlanta Hospital, now closed. Two years after college she enrolled in the Georgetown University School of Medicine, matriculating in 1947. She graduated on June 11, 1951, with her medical degree, summa cum laude (highest honors), with the highest grades in her class, and with the highest national board grades in pathology in the United States. She graduated alongside four other women who together were the first to graduate in the program's 101-year history. She received a gold medal for highest achievement in bacteriology. She then qualified as a surgeon with her residency at Georgetown University Hospital (now part of MedStar).

In 1951, she interned for one year at Saint Michael's Medical Center in Newark, New Jersey. Then, on October 1, 1952, she began work as a junior resident surgeon at Arlington Hospital in Northern Virginia, near Washington, DC, becoming the first member of a religious community to be a resident at that hospital. She expressed her deep affection for her work in a December 1953 article in The Washington Post, stating, "I love it. I don't even want to come home. It is so much more satisfactory to be where you are needed." After an internship and residency, she returned to Georgetown University for a Master of Science in Surgery degree, which she received in 1954. Niedfield served as the Chief Resident for Surgery at Georgetown University Hospital from 1954 to 1955.

== Medical service in India ==
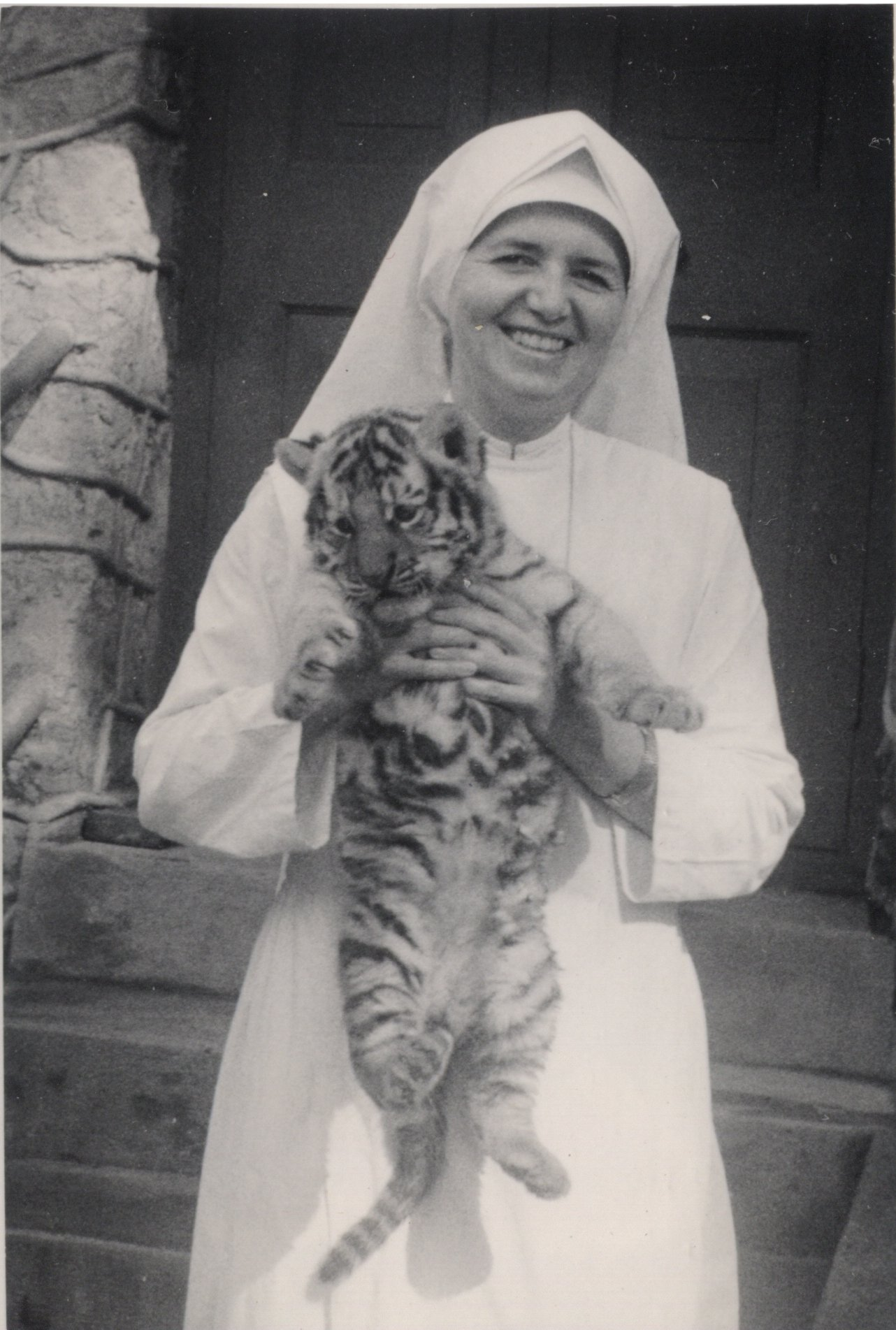
With a tiger cub in India

Niedfield studied the Hindustani language during her surgery coursework, and then sailed for India in 1955. The MMS operated seven hospitals in South Asia, four in India and three in Pakistan, eventually expanding to eleven. She joined Dr. Ruth Taggart, a graduate of the Woman's Medical College of Pennsylvania, who was the superintendent of the medical college's hospital. Cumulatively, she spent nearly 40 years working in a variety of roles including surgeon, chief of surgery, and hospital superintendent, at Kurji Holy Family Hospital, Village of Mandar, Rachi District, State of Bihar, with four years (1960–64) in Patna, India, serving many Muslim women whose husbands and fathers would not allow them to be treated by male doctors. The hospital averaged 600 major surgical cases per year, and had 3,000 total inpatients annually. Its services included general care, surgery, obstetrics-gynecology, pediatrics, a pharmacy, a substance abuse detox center, and a nursing school, all of which she oversaw while serving as hospital superintendent (1987–1992).

Her congregation and Mother Teresa's were connected, because Mother Teresa worked briefly at one of the Medical Mission Sisters' hospitals, and they and the Missionaries of Charity periodically trained one another's nurses.

In 1966, Niedfield returned to the United States to complete some requirements of the American Board of Surgery that had recently been augmented. She then became a Fellow of the American College of Surgeons, and was listed as a board-certified surgeon. She also filled a suitcase with an intravenous glucose mixture because of a sugar shortage in India, coupled with a famine. "It's only enough for four or five operations," she told a correspondent for the College of Physicians of Philadelphia, "but it might well save a life." Supplies were a constant worry. While in India, she started a nonprofit charity, "Sr. Niedfield's Brothers", to collect funds for surgical instruments and medical supplies. In Washington, DC, Dr. George Ware collected the money and sent it to her.

Niedfield became a bi-monthly columnist for the MMS, contributing a column titled "The Doctor's Diary". On April 24, 1967, the work of the MMS was honored by Representative Joshua Eilberg (Democrat from Pennsylvania) when he read a citation including her name into the Congressional Record. In the book The Hills Around Me, author Imtiaz Fiona Griffiths describes how Dr. Niedfield saved her husband's life in India by performing emergency surgery.

== Her time in Bhutan ==
Niedfield spent two years (1979–1981) in Bhutan, a kingdom on the border between Tibet and India. She wrote that they could not enter Bhutan without receiving an official invitation, because it was an isolationist state. However, the Buddhist Bhutanese government was eager to update the quality of its healthcare, so health ministers invited her there in a non-missionary capacity.

There she served as the zonal medical officer and as the chief medical officer at the 60-bed Tashigang Civil Hospital in eastern Bhutan near the Chinese border. Patients suffering from leprosy and tuberculosis were common. Some of the health centers in the zone were only accessible on horseback. Creating and conducting short courses on basic medical care, and issuing standing orders for simple medical conditions, were vital, as it was impossible to get to each center across the large zone more than four times each year. Although the Bhutan government offered to renew her contract, she said she left because the work was too remote and lonely.

== Other medical service and legacy ==
During Niedfield's time abroad, she was brought back to the U.S. for training, time with family, and rest. She dedicated one of these trips (1976–77) in service as a staff physician with the American Medical Association's "Project USA" program in support of the U.S. Department of Health, Education, & Welfare. She worked in South Dakota at the Aberdeen Area Indian Health Service, the Omaha-Winnebago Service Unit, and at the Fort Defiance, Arizona Indian Hospital.

In 1992, she moved to serve at the Owen Clinic with HIV/AIDS patients. "I was interested in AIDS because I felt there was a great need not just medically but also socially and spiritually," she told a reporter. In those years she was also a part-time volunteer at the St. Vincent de Paul Village-Joan Kroc Medical Clinic in San Diego, serving people experiencing homelessness. During her time in San Diego, Niedfield also worked part time as a primary care physician in internal medicine at the San Diego Veterans Administration Outpatient Clinic (1993–2001), and as an assistant clinical professor of internal medicine for the University of California San Diego.

In 2001, largely due to failing eyesight, she retired from practicing medicine at the age of 81 and moved to the Regina Residence in Orange, California, run by the Sisters of St. Joseph. She died on March 19, 2007.

In 2019, students at Georgetown University circulated a petition and published an op-ed calling on the university to name a pavilion for her at MedStar Georgetown University Hospital. As of April 2025 the effort has not been successful, and the pavilion was named for the donor, philanthropist Grant Verstandig.
