= General Payne =

General Payne may refer to:

- Elisha Payne (1731–1807), Vermont Militia major general
- Frederick R. Payne Jr. (1911–2015), U.S. Marine Corps brigadier general
- Morris B. Payne (1885–1961), Connecticut National Guard major general
- William H. F. Payne (1830–1904), Confederate States Army brigadier general

== See also ==
- Sir William Payne-Gallwey, 1st Baronet (1759–1831), British Army general
- General Paine (disambiguation)
