= Merion Mercy Academy =

- Mater Misericordiae Academy
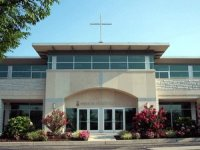
- Merion Mercy Academy

Location
- 511 Montgomery Avenue; Merion, (Montgomery County), Pennsylvania 19066; United States; 40°0′34″N 75°15′1″W

Information
- Type: Private
- Motto: Live Mercy, Seek Justice
- Religious affiliation: Roman Catholic
- Established: 1884
- President: Marianne Grace
- Dean: Taylor Stokes
- Head of school: Philip Vinogradov
- Faculty: 41
- Grades: 9-12
- Gender: Girls
- Enrollment: 468 (2026-2027)
- Average class size: 15
- Student to teacher ratio: 10:1
- Campus type: Suburban
- Colors: Blue and Gold
- Song: Alma Mater
- Athletics: Basketball, Cross Country, Field Hockey, Golf, Soccer, Tennis, Volleyball, Swimming, Crew, Lacrosse, Softball, Track & Field, Cheer, Flag Football
- Athletics conference: PIAA
- Mascot: Golden Bear
- Nickname: Goldie the Golden Bear
- Rival: Mount Saint Joseph Academy Villa Maria Academy
- Accreditation: Middle States Association of Colleges and Schools
- Publication: Image Explosion (literary magazine)
- Newspaper: Ricordia
- Yearbook: Meriannal
- Tuition: $26,665
- Affiliation: Sisters of Mercy
- Athletic Director: Janice Duffield
- Website: www.merion-mercy.com

Merion Mercy Academy is a Catholic, college preparatory school for young women grades 9 through 12, founded by the Sisters of Mercy located in Merion, Pennsylvania, just outside Philadelphia. It is an independent school located in the Archdiocese of Philadelphia and was known as the "Mater Misericordiae Academy" prior to 1968.

== History ==
Significant changes have taken place from 1987 to the present. Recent events include the merger of the lower school with Waldron Academy for Boys next door in 1987, thereby giving the entire 72,000-square-foot (6,700 m^{2}) Merion Mercy building, built in 1954, to the education of high school girls. The new grade school was named Waldron Mercy Academy. Academically, the school earned a Blue Ribbon School of Excellence Award in 1996 as recognition from the United States Department of Education.

A 27,000-square-foot (2,500 m^{2}) addition to the MMA building in 2003 added a new chapel, administrative offices, classrooms and meeting rooms, new athletic facilities, and a study center for students. Some other significant renovations took place in the summer of 2004. The school's principal from 2007 to 2018 was Sister Barbara Buckley, who is also an alumna. The current head of school is Marianne Grace, a former chair of the Board of Trustees, and previous Director of Operation.

== Athletics ==
Merion Mercy joined the Pennsylvania Interscholastic Athletic Association (PIAA) in 1994 for scholastic athletic competition. The next year the basketball team won the state PIAA Class AA championship. Continuing their success, the track and field team won the PIAA state championship in 1998 and in 2001, and the volleyball team won the PIAA state championship in 2001 and 2003. The volleyball team earned back-to-back-to-back-to-back state championships in 2007, 2008, 2009 and 2010. The crew team won the Groton Cup at the Henley Regatta in 2011 and both the Freshmen 8 and Varsity 4 won Stotesbury in 2012. The building houses the Patricia Waldron Fitness Center.

== Notable alumnae ==
- Patricia McGuire, president, Trinity Washington University
- Alyse Wojciechowski (Alyse Alan Louis) replacement for Sophie Sheridan in Mamma Mia on Broadway
- Gianna Yanelli, on Broadway in Mean Girls the Musical
- Patricia Carbine, co-founder, editor, and publisher, Ms. (magazine)
- Cheryl Dunye, filmmaker, actor, screenwriter
