= Maria Leavey =

American political consultant

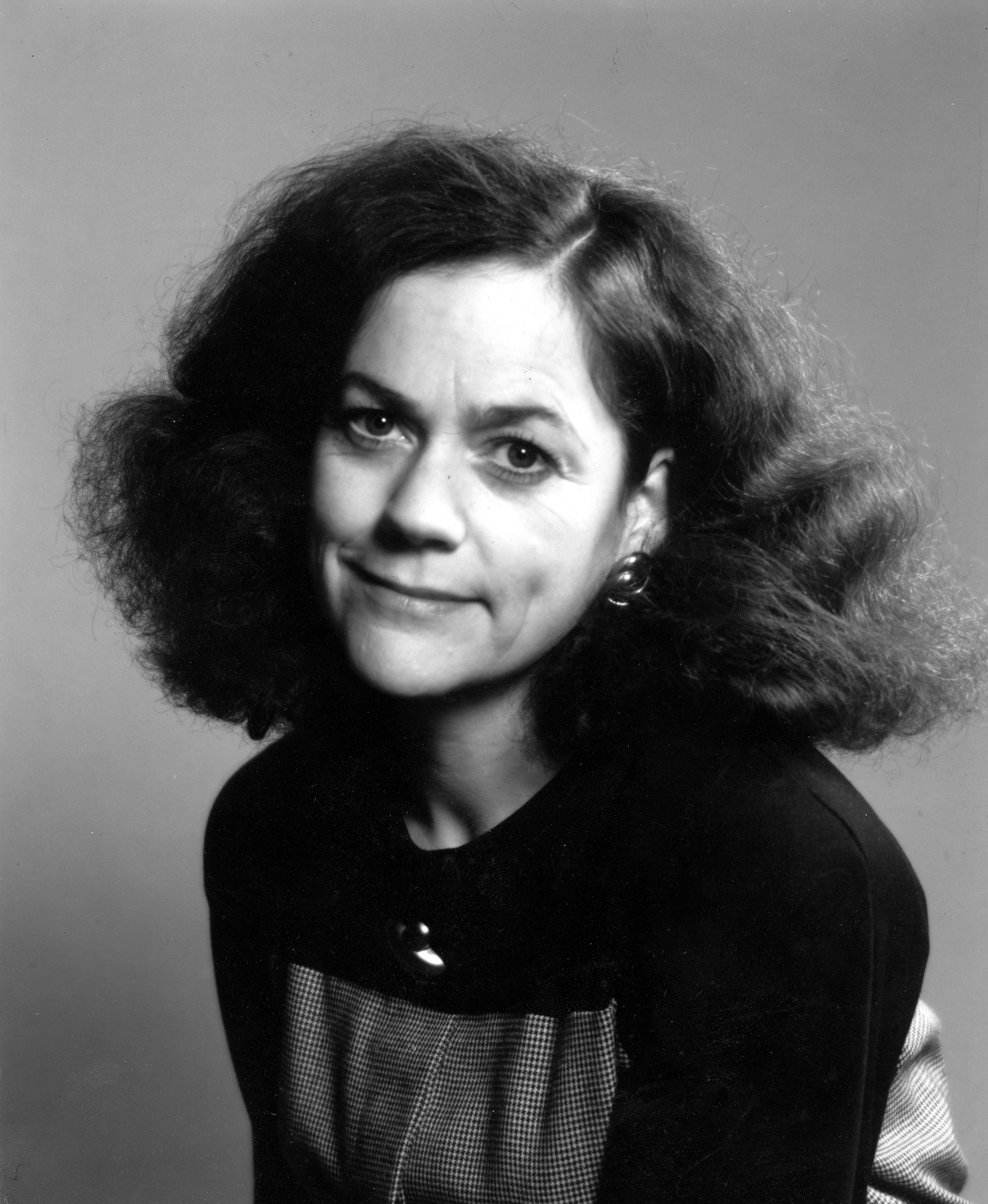
Leavey, 1954–2006

Maria Irene Leavey (January 1, 1954 – December 31, 2006) was an American independent political strategist. Little known to the public, she played an influential behind-the-scenes role in American progressive politics during the 1990s and 2000s. Her death at age 52 was publicly lamented by progressive figures including Michael Tomasky, Joe Conason, and Cenk Uygur.

== Early life and educationr ==
Leavey was born on January 1, 1954, to William J. Leavey, a United States Army soldier stationed in Pisa Italy, and the former Irene Schmitt. She had a brother and a sister, in what was a family of Irish Catholic background.

She grew up in Queens, New York City. Her father retired from the military with the rank of lieutenant colonel, and took a job in 1968 as an assistant professor of history at Lock Haven State College, at which point the family moved to Lock Haven, Pennsylvania.

She attended Lock Haven High Schoo], where she was named a member of the National Honor Society as a sophomore. She graduated from there in 1971.

She then attended Trinity College in Washington, D.C. where she graduated as a member of Phi Beta Kappa.

== Career ==
After college Leavey moved back to New York City, where during the mid-late 1970s she lived in Jackson Heights, Queens and worked as a benefits authorizer for the Social Security Administration's Northeastern Program Service Center in Rego Park, Queens. She subsequently got a job working as an editor at Harcourt, Brace, Jovanovich in Manhattan.

In 1985, she entered graduate school at Pennsylvania State University, earning a master's in American history in 1989. During this time, she served as editor of a Perspectives on film and video ethnographic studies volume for the university in 1988.

In the early 1990s, she was involved in teaching American history at Penn State University. She also worked for the local public television station, WPSU-TV, in the early 1990s, interviewing candidates running for office and making a documentary about Harris Wofford, a Democratic Party politician who won the 1991 United States Senate special election in Pennsylvania.

In 1993, Leavey moved to Washington, D.C., where she lived on a small apartment in Crystal City, Virginia. Though she did not have a regular job and had very little money, she managed to become quite well connected within Washington, D.C. politics. She was a consultant to Howard Dean during his presidential campaign and worked with Senators Tom Harkin and Harry Reid. She was known for having insider gossip before others, and for having a rare understanding of the personalities and complex rules that govern the Senate.

She started a monthly breakfast to connect journalists with figures in liberal politics including Reid, Dean, John Podesta, and Nancy Pelosi. She was a true believe in the progressive movement who focused on doing unglamorous, behind-the-scenes tasks. She was known for baking cookies for everyone from leading politicians to her postal worker.

== Death ==
Leavey died of heart disease on December 31, 2006, the day before her 53rd birthday. Her death was likely due to an undiagnosed heart condition that was hereditary in her family; her father died suddenly at age 54 in 1978.

== Legacy ==
Because she had no regular job, she lacked health insurance; had she had health insurance and access to regular medical checkups, she might well have been treated and survived. Her death has been cited by progressive activists as a wake-up call about the lack of resources flowing to dedicated activists who are outside the think tank sphere.

The irony is that conservative groups, whose leaders are often stereotyped as stingy and heartless, tend to provide far better conditions for their troops than progressive organizations do. The right may or may not have more money, but it has used what it has to provide a living for the people who build its institutions, which have thrived as a result. Maria deserved much better – and so do the many like her who accept low wages to uphold their ideals. Being able to pay the rent, get health insurance and even take a vacation would not corrupt them.

— Joe Conason, writing in Salon, January 12, 2007

Maria wasn't the type of person who would demand something for herself; she just sacrificed rather than put her allies in an uncomfortable situation. This was the case even with health insurance. She had many invaluable skills, but getting progressives to value her wasn't one of them. It is the disrespect towards people like Maria, a willingness to toss our best allies aside like unnecessary conveniences, that is our biggest moral flaw. I don't know if the new progressive movement matters, or if we're going to succeed. But what is very clear is that what we are doing is built on the willingness of people to sacrifice their lives and their time to work for change. ... Our priorities are really messed up. When our organizations and groups allow people like Maria to die for their lack of health care, while at the same time funneling hundreds of millions of dollars into TV commercials, it's really bad. If it continues, we will fail. It's that simple.

— Matt Stoller writing at MyDD, January 8, 2007

The Campaign for America's Future created an annual award in Maria's memorial named the Maria Leavey Tribute Award, in honor of the person they called "the quintessential unsung progressive hero ... [who] rarely received the recognition she deserved during her influential life." The sixth annual such award was given out in 2012; it is unclear if the award has continued since then. The Maria Leavey Memorial Breakfast Series, which connected elected officials with progressive bloggers, was also named after her and was held at least a couple of times.
