= L. Bancel LaFarge =

American architect

Major L. Bancel LaFarge in uniform during the Second World War

L. Bancel LaFarge (1900–1989) was an American architect. He was a founding member of the New York City Landmarks Preservation Commission.

== Early life and education ==
Louis Bancel LaFarge was born into a prominent American family. His grandfather, John LaFarge, was a noted American artist. His grandmother was a granddaughter of Commodore Oliver Hazard Perry and a direct descendant of Benjamin Franklin. His father, Bancel LaFarge, was an artist who continued his father's work in glass, and his brother Tom was a mural painter.

LaFarge was a graduate of Harvard College and the Yale School of Architecture. He married the advertising executive Margaret Hockaday, with whom he had three children: Timothy, Benjamin, and Celestine.

== Career ==
LaFarge established himself as an architect in New York specializing in domestic architecture. His practice was interrupted by military service in the Second World War. At war's end, he returned to his work as an architect. At one time he served as president of the New York chapter of the American Institute of Architects (1958–1960), and he was a founding member of the New York City Landmarks Preservation Commission (1965–1970).

== World War II ==
Major LaFarge was assigned to the 7th Army in Europe during the Second World War. He was the Chief of the Monuments, Fine Arts, and Archives (MFAA) section. LaFarge was the first MFAA officer to arrive in France after D-Day in 1944.

== See also ==
- Roberts Commission
- Nazi Plunder
- Rescuing Da Vinci
- The Rape of Europa
- Monuments, Fine Arts, and Archives program
- Monuments Men Foundation for the Preservation of Art
