= Patricia McGuire =

American academic administrator

14th President of Trinity Washington University
- In office 1989–present
- Preceded by: James McGrath

Personal details
- Born: 1952 (age 73–74) Philadelphia, U.S.
- Education: Trinity College, Washington (BA); Georgetown University (JD)
- Website: www.trinitydc.edu

Patricia McGuire (born 1952) is the 14th president of Trinity Washington University in Washington D.C.; she was appointed president in 1989. She is credited with successfully transitioning the institution from one that primarily served elites and was on the verge of collapse to one that primarily caters to underprivileged students, mostly local black and Hispanic women.

== Early life and career ==
A native of Philadelphia, she graduated from Merion Mercy Academy, in Merion, Pennsylvania. She earned her bachelor of arts degree cum laude in political science from Trinity College, now Trinity Washington University, in 1974 and her law degree from the Georgetown University Law Center in 1977. She was the Assistant Dean for Development and External Affairs for Georgetown University Law Center, where she was also an adjunct professor of law teaching courses in tax exempt organizations. She also was project director for Georgetown's D.C. Street Law Project as well as a legal affairs commentator for the CBS News children's television newsmagazine 30 Minutes and Washington TV Channel 5’s talk show, Panorama, hosted by Maury Povich.

== Trinity presidency ==
She is credited with the transformation of Trinity. Under her leadership, Trinity has nearly doubled its enrollment, expanded academic programs, completed its first successful capital campaign, became a university in 2004, and built the 2004 Washington Business Journal’s award-winning $20-million Trinity Center for Women and Girls in Sports, a state-of-the-art athletic center. She has focused on meeting the educational needs of the Washington, D.C., community and today, Trinity educates more D.C. Public School graduates than any other private university in the city and in the nation.

During her tenure, Trinity’s institutional accreditation was affirmed in 1996 and 2006 by the Middle States Commission on Higher Education. Also, Trinity also secured accreditation from the National Council for Accreditation for Teacher Education (NCATE) for its education programs and from the Commission on Collegiate Nursing Education (CCNE) for Trinity’s RN-to-BSN program.

She also established an academic program at THEARC (Town Hall, Education, Arts and Recreation Campus) in Southeast Washington, making Trinity the only university to offer college degrees east of the Anacostia River in D.C.

== Boards and other activities ==
McGuire is currently a member of the boards of directors of the Greater Washington Board of Trade, the Washington Hospital Center, the Washington Metropolitan Consortium of Universities, the National Defense Intelligence College, the Women’s College Coalition, the UNIFI Mutual Holding Company and Acacia Life Insurance Company, and Goodwill of Greater Washington. She is slated to join the boards of the American Council on Education and United Educators in 2008. She serves on advisory boards and committees of the Girl Scouts of the USA of the Nation’s Capital and the National Postsecondary Education Cooperative of the U.S. Department of Education. Prior service includes the boards of the Eugene and Agnes Meyer Foundation, the National Association of Independent Colleges and Universities, and Elderhostel, as well as vice chair of the Commission on Higher Education of the Middle States Association, and chair of the Commission on Lifelong Learning of the American Council on Education.

In 2006, she served on the independent advisory panel on governance for the American Red Cross. In 2000, D. C. Mayor Anthony Williams and the D.C. Financial Control Board appointed her to a special term on the Education Advisory Committee overseeing the D.C. Public Schools. In June 1998, Treasury Secretary Robert Rubin appointed her to serve as a member of the first-ever citizens’ advisory panel on coinage, the 8-member Dollar Coin Design Advisory Committee, which recommended the image of Sacagawea for the new dollar coin.

== Honors and awards ==
She holds honorary doctorates from Georgetown University, the College of New Rochelle, and the College of St. Elizabeth. In 2007 the Greater Washington Board of Trade honored her as the “Leader of the Years,” one of only six women ever to receive this annual award from this regional business organization. Washingtonian magazine named her a Washingtonian of the Year in 1993; Washingtonian has also recognized her on lists of the “100 Most Powerful Women in Washington” and “150 Most Powerful People in Washington”. The Washington Business Journal included her among the Women Who Mean Business award recipients in 2006. She has received honors and awards from the Girl Scouts of the Nation's Capital, Gallaudet University, the Ignatian Solidarity Network, Ward 5 in Washington, and other civic and educational organizations.

== Testimony, speeches and articles ==
She has given testimony before US Senate and House committees on a range of topics in higher education. She writes and speaks on a wide variety of topics concerning higher education and her articles have appeared in The Wall Street Journal, The Washington Post, The Baltimore Sun, Trusteeship, the LA Times and other publications. Unique among presidents in the Washington region, she also maintains a blog on Trinity's website through which she offers commentary on contemporary issues.

=== Selected testimony, speeches and articles ===
- Campus Communications in the Age of Crisis, The Presidency, The American Council on Education's Magazine for Higher Education Leaders article, Fall 2007
- Report Card on Tax Exemptions and Incentives for Higher Education: Pass, Fail or Need Improvement?, Tuesday, December 5, 2006 Testimony before the Senate Finance Committee
- Remarks for the Women's History Month Program of the Federal Triangle Partnership, Tuesday, March 14, 2006
- Testimony Before the Council of the District of Columbia Committee on Education, Libraries and Recreation, Concerning Higher Education Financial Assistance, September 22, 2005
- Remarks from Wells College Commencement, May 28, 2005
- Creativity, Innovation, Celebration: The Future of Women's Colleges, Remarks for the Centennial * Convocation of the College of New Rochelle, March 23, 2004
- President McGuire Gives Commencement Speech at Her Alma Mater, Merion Mercy Academy, in Merion, Pennsylvania, June 1, 2003
- Strategic Planning as the Roadmap to Renaissance, Published by the Association of Catholic Colleges and Universities Current Issues in Catholic Higher Education publication, Winter 2003
- Freedom, Justice, Hope: The Witness of the University, Remarks to the Class of 2002 of Georgetown College, Georgetown University Commencement, May 18, 2002
- What to Expect When the Evaluators Arrive.... or... The Seven Deadly Sins of Accreditation Visits, Remarks for Middle States Conference of Chief Academic Officers, March 22, 2002
