= Ludmila Javorová =

Czech Roman Catholic theologian (1932–2026)

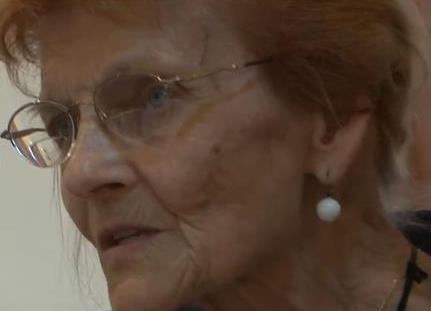
Javorová in 2017

Ludmila Javorová (31 January 1932 – 17 September 2026) was a Czech Roman Catholic who worked in the underground church during the time of communist rule in Czechoslovakia and served as the vicar general of a clandestine bishop. She was one of a number of Czech women who were reputed to have been secretly ordained as priests, the validity of which has been disputed since.

== Biography ==
Javorová was born in Brno on 31 January 1932, into a Catholic family. Although she expressed a wish to become a nun, that was not possible in the time of communism, so she started to work in civilian professions and to support church activities in her free time.

According to statements made in 1995 and later, the underground bishop Felix Maria Davídek, a friend of Javorová's family, secretly ordained her on 29 December 1970 during the early years of Soviet occupation of the country after the Prague Spring. She had served as his secretary and deputy after his release from prison in 1964 and "gradually took over important tasks in organising the clandestine Church structure Koinótés". Davídek named her his vicar general and later ordained her a priest. Around five women were thought to have been ordained in total, with Javorová the only one publicly known.

After the end of communist rule in Czechoslovakia in 1989, Javorová seemingly tried for some time to conceal her status from the public, saying that "the time is not ripe to talk about that". Around 1995, she changed her mind and decided to speak publicly. She helped to prepare a book interview about her experiences which was authored by Miriam Therese Winter. Javorová lived in Brno and remained an active member of the Roman Catholic Church. She was recently a speaker of the liturgical commission of her local parish.

Javorová died on 17 September 2026, at the age of 94.

== Controversy ==
Although there is thought to be no evidence that an ordination ceremony did or did not take place as claimed, its theological significance has been the subject of controversy.

On one side, Davidek, who had himself spent 14 years in prison as a result of his faith, justified the ordinations based on the pastoral needs of a church suffering harsh persecution, particularly of women tortured in prison who had no contact with male priests but could be ministered to by priests of the same gender. Archbishop John Bukovsky has described the ordinations as "illicit but valid".

On the other side, the Catechism of the Catholic Church states that an ordination ceremony performed on a woman would be invalid as well as illicit; this doctrine is found in the writings of Thomas Aquinas and many others. Pope John Paul II wrote that "Priestly ordination, which hands on the office entrusted by Christ to his Apostles of teaching, sanctifying and governing the faithful, has in the Catholic Church from the beginning always been reserved to men alone" in his apostolic etter, Ordinatio sacerdotalis. This is reflected in the current Code of Canon Law.

Within Davídek's group itself, the ordination of women and of married men was highly controversial and may have played a role in its splitting in the early 1970s. Davídek himself concealed Javorová's ordination from many of his co-workers and demanded written promises of "absolute silence on the matter" from people participating in his secret ordinations. Historians Fiala and Hanuš argue that these ordained women had very few specific sacerdotal tasks in Davídek's group, and conclude from this that their ordinations can therefore be considered as only a "symbolical act and a precedent".

Christian publisher Hermann Herder – who had met Javorová – said in an interview that the ordination had been real, but was invalidated by the Vatican after the fall of the communist regime.

== See also ==
- Roman Catholic Womenpriests
- Christian views of women
- Deaconess
