= Bancel La Farge =

American artist

- Born: September 23, 1865; Newport, Rhode Island, US
- Died: August 15, 1938 (aged 72); Mount Carmel, Hamden, Connecticut, US
- Spouse: Mabel Hooper

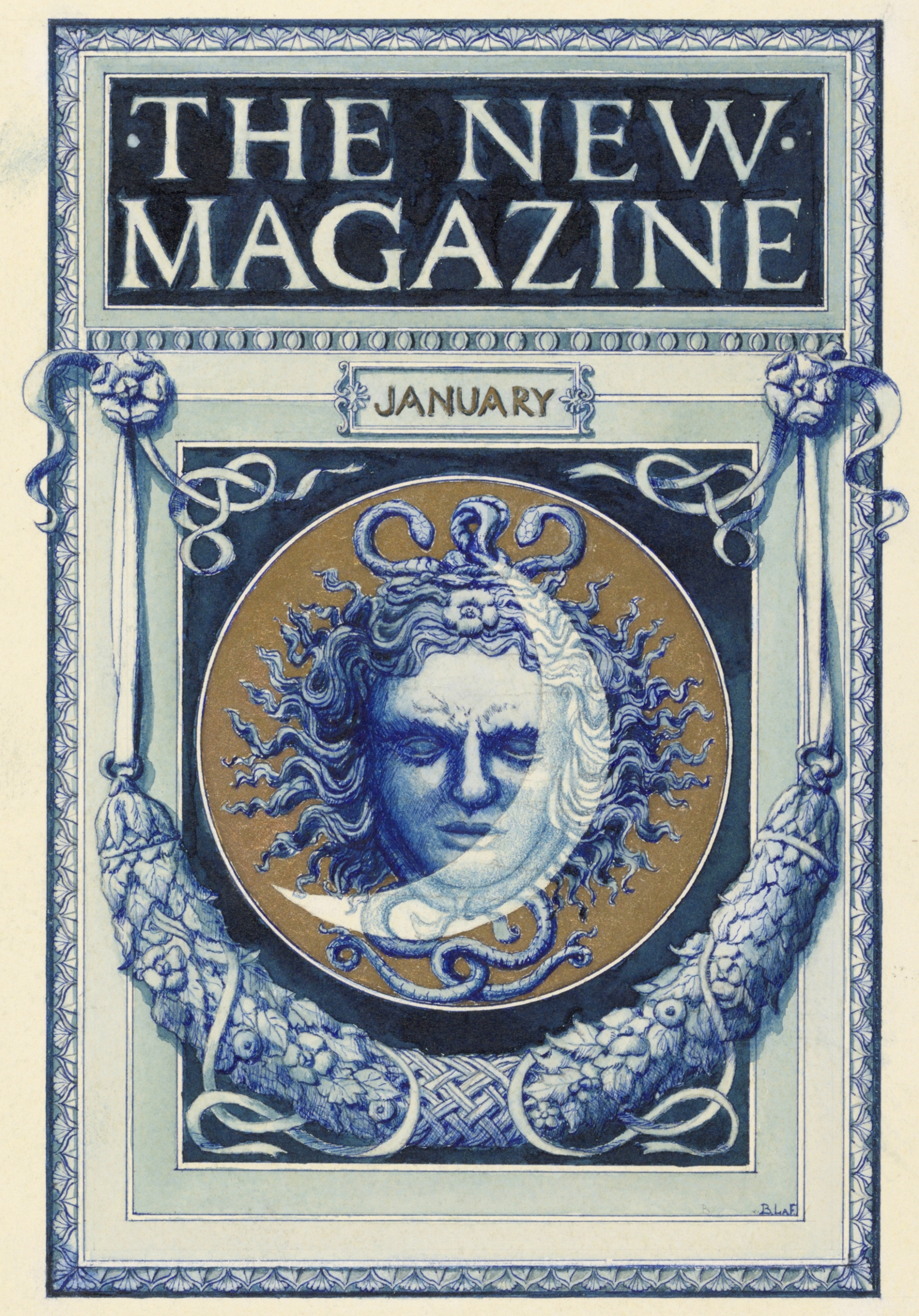
Drawing, New Magazine, ca. 1911

Bancel La Farge (1865–1938) was an American artist known for his mural painting and decorative work.

== Biography ==
La Farge was born in Newport, Rhode Island on September 23, 1865. He was the son of the artist John LaFarge and Margaret Perry LaFarge. In 1898 he married Mabel Hooper with whom he had four children. Bancel La Farge started his career as an assistant to his father at his studio. He moved to Europe where he continued his artistic training.

Returning to the United States, La Farge created liturgical art in the form of murals, mosaics, stained glass and other decorations for churches such as the Basilica of the National Shrine of the Immaculate Conception in Washington, D.C., the Church of the Immaculate Conception in Newport, Rhode Island, St. Mary' Chapel at Saint Paul Seminary in St. Paul, Minnesota, Saint Charles Seminary in Catonsville, Maryland, and Notre Dame Chapel at Trinity Washington University.

In 1934 La Farge was commissioned by the Federal Emergency Relief Administration to create lunettes for the New Haven Public Library. They were completed under the Federal Arts Project.

La Farge died on August 15, 1938, in the Mount Carmel neighborhood of Hamden, Connecticut. His papers are in the Smithsonian Institution.

His four sons were Edward Hooper La Farge, Henry Adams La Farge, Louis Bancel La Farge, and Thomas Sergeant La Farge.
