= Felix Maria Davídek =

Czeck Roman Catholic bishop (1921-1928)

The Most Reverend Felix Maria Davídek
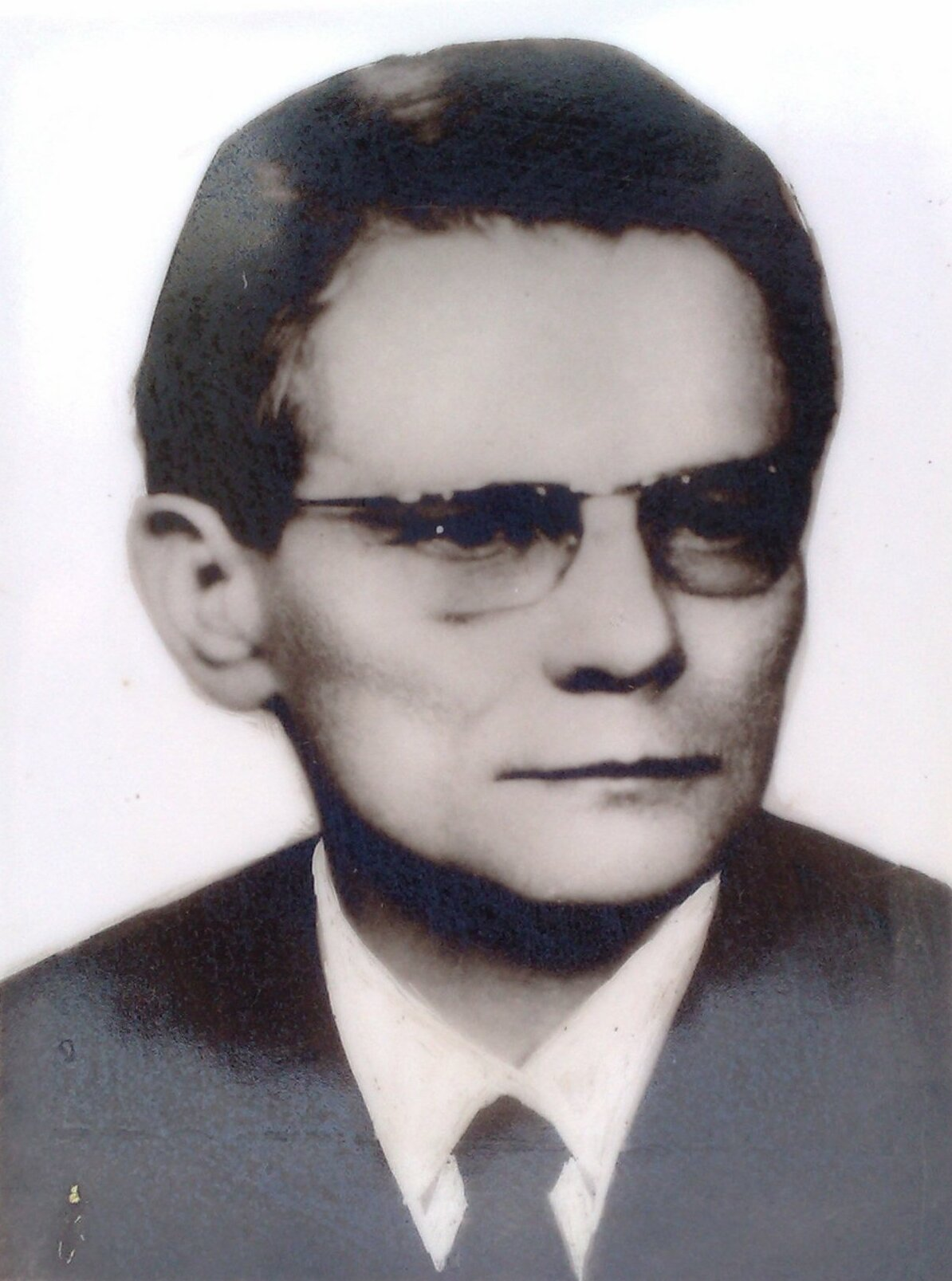
- Church: Catholic Church

Orders
- Ordination: 29 June 1945
- Consecration: 29 October 1967 by Jan Blaha

Personal details
- Born: 12 January 1921 Chrlice, Czechoslovakia
- Died: 18 August 1988 (aged 67) Brno, Czechoslovakia
- Denomination: Roman Catholicism

Felix Maria Davídek (12 January 1921 – 18 August 1988) was a Czech bishop of the Roman Catholic Church and poet.

== Life ==
Davídek was born in Chrlice in Czechoslovakia (now Brno-Chrlice, a municipal part of Brno in the Czech Republic). He was ordained a priest on 29 June 1945 in the Diocese of Brno. He was arrested by the StB (Czechoslovak secret police) and was in prison from 1950 to 1964. He was secretly ordained a bishop by Bishop Jan Blaha, under appeal to pontifical privileges granted from 1951 to 1989 to bishops in communist countries, on 29 October 1967, and was given the assignment to pastor the clandestine or so-called underground church in Communist Czechoslovakia.

It was reported in 1992 that in 1978 the "Vatican ordered Father Davídek to cease performing the duties of a bishop."

== Irregular ordinations ==
Interest in Davídek greatly increased when it was disclosed after his death that, by the account of Ludmila Javorová and others, he had administered the sacrament of holy orders to Javorová and about four other women. Bishop Blaha declared any such ordinations would have been invalid. Pope John Paul II, in his 1994 apostolic letter Ordinatio sacerdotalis, wrote that "In order that all doubt may be removed regarding a matter of great importance [...] I declare that the Church has no authority whatsoever to confer priestly ordination on women and that this judgment is to be definitively held by all the Church's faithful."

The irregular situation of priests in the Czech Republic in active ministry, but the validity of whose ordination was in doubt, was largely resolved by 2000 through discussions with the Holy See. In February 2000, the Congregation for the Doctrine of the Faith issued a declaration on the subject, announcing (a) that with regard to celibate priests, a great part (some 50 in all) had accepted the decision of the Pope that they should be conditionally re-ordained, and (b) that a further 22 priests who were married should also be conditionally re-ordained and transferred to the Byzantine Rite as priests of the Apostolic Exarchate of the Greek Catholic Church in the Czech Republic. There remained the status of some of the bishops and priests secretly ordained who had not accepted the norms (for conditional re-ordination) approved by the Pope, specifically because they were convinced they had already been validly ordained. While the Vatican confirmed that "conditional re-ordination" did not exclude the possibility that the men had previously been validly ordained, it held to the view that the doubts over validity were genuine:

"In reality, based on research done on each case, priestly ordination was not always conferred in a valid manner; perhaps in some cases it may have been, but there remained serious doubts about this, especially in the case of ordinations carried out by Bishop Felix Maria Davidek."
