= Southwest Atlanta Hospital =

Geography
- Location: Atlanta, Georgia, United States
- Coordinates: 33°44′23″N 84°30′44″W

Organization
- Type: General

Services
- Beds: 125

History
- Former name: Catholic Colored Clinic
- Opened: June, 1942
- Closed: January 16, 2009

Links
- Lists: Hospitals in Georgia

Southwest Hospital and Medical Center was a hospital located in Atlanta, Georgia, United States, and dates its origin to the early 1940s. In 1940, a group of Catholic laywomen, under the direction of the local bishop, established a recreational center for African Americans known as the Colored Mission Center. The following year, Our Lady of Lourdes Catholic Church and the Society of Catholic Medical Missionaries established the Catholic Colored Clinic in response to the lack of adequate medical care in southwest Atlanta. The Catholic Colored Clinic provided free services, and its physicians, most of whom were non-Catholic, volunteered their time. It later became known as the Holy Family Hospital before becoming a secular institution.

Southwest Hospital was a private, not for profit, health care organization. It was a licensed 125-bed acute-care facility, accredited by the Joint Commission. SWH's medical staff includes over 200 physicians specializing in many fields of medicine. The hospital and its physicians participated in numerous managed care and other health insurance plans throughout Metro Atlanta.

The hospital shut down multiple times in the years leading up to its closure, reopening briefly between periods of financial difficulty, before ultimately closing permanently on January 16, 2009 due to credit market conditions. The renovated property was reopened in October 2014 as the Atlanta Center for Medical Research.

== Civil Rights ==
During the civil rights era, the hospital was involved in broader efforts to integrate medical facilities in Atlanta. In 1972, integration efforts expanded into southwest Atlanta, including Holy Family Hospital. Activist groups such as The United Youth Adult Conference organized protests, labor strikes, and demonstrations advocating for voting rights and workplace equality. Tensions arose as the hospital’s white administration resisted full integration of Black medical staff, leading to strikes by doctors and nurses. Activists, including Arthur Langford Jr. and Willie Ricks, staged a hunger strike in solidarity. Opposition to the demonstration escalated outside the hospital on April 27, 1972, when Langford and Ricks were shot and wounded during an evening demonstration.
