= United States Post Office–New London Main =

- US Post Office-New London Main
- U.S. National Register of Historic Places
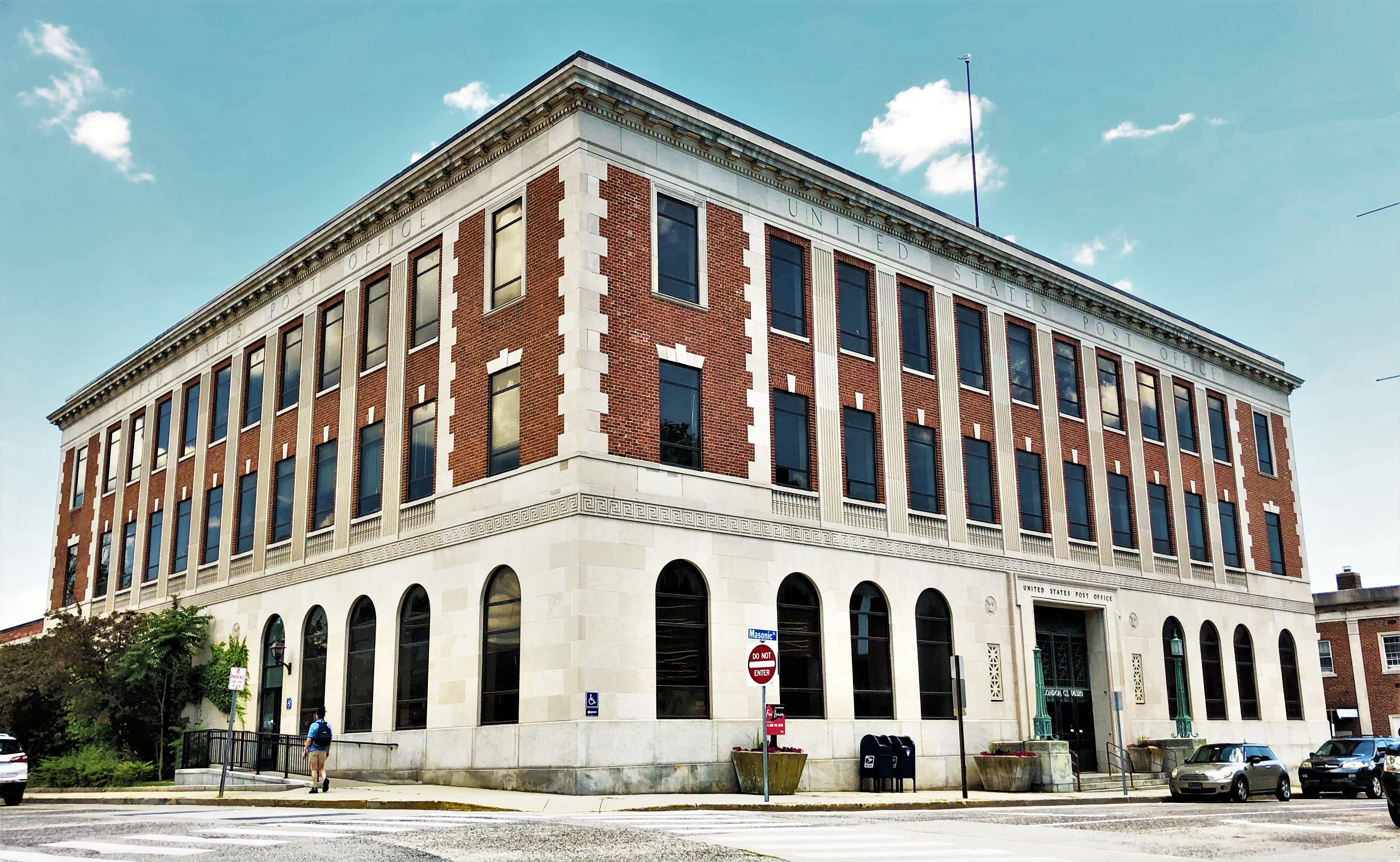
- (2022)

- Location within Connecticut Location within the United States
- Location: 27 Masonic Street, New London, Connecticut
- Coordinates: 41°21′19″N 72°5′48″W
- Area: 1.5 acres (0.61 ha)
- Built: 1932-1934
- Architect: Payne & Keefe
- Architectural style: Classical Revival; Art Deco
- NRHP reference No.: 86000124
- Added to NRHP: January 21, 1986

The U.S. Post Office-New London Main is located at 27 Masonic Street in New London, Connecticut. Completed in 1934 as part of a Depression-era jobs program, it is one of the small number of such post offices designed by a private architectural firm, Payne & Keefe. The building was listed on the National Register of Historic Places in 1986.

== Description and history ==
New London's main post office is located in the downtown area, at the northeast corner of Masonic and Union Streets. It is a three-story steel-framed structure, finished in limestone on the ground floor, and in brick with limestone trim (notably pilasters and corner quoining) on the upper levels. Its main entrance is highlighted by bronze Art Deco panels of eagles, eagles carved in limestone, and a pair of Art Deco lights on stone stands. The main lobby is decorated with Greek-themed Art Deco work, with multicolored marble floors. Murals depicting whaling activities line the walls.

The building was designed by the local firm of Payne & Keefe, and built in 1933-34 pursuant to the terms of the Public Buildings Act, which amended the Public Buildings Act of 1926 to allow buildings designed by non-government architects. The murals, considered among the finest Depression-era post office murals in the state, were funded by a Public Works of Art Project grant, executed by Thomas Sergeant La Farge, and installed in 1938. The principal alteration to the building exterior is the addition of a loading dock in 1977; the property was also expanded by the purchase of an adjacent lot for parking.

== See also ==
- National Register of Historic Places listings in New London County, Connecticut
- List of United States post offices
