= Jan Blaha =

- Bishop
- Church: Catholic Church

Orders
- Ordination: 12 July 1967 by Josef Stimpfle
- Consecration: 28 October 1967 by Peter Dubovský

Personal details
- Born: 12 March 1938 Brno, Czechoslovakia
- Died: 13 December 2012 (aged 74) Brno, Czech Republic

Styles of Jan Blaha
- Reference style: The Most Reverend
- Spoken style: Your Excellency
- Religious style: Monsignor
- Posthumous style: none

Jan Blaha (12 March 1938 in Brno – 13 December 2012 in Brno) was a Czech clandestine Roman Catholic bishop. After the Velvet Revolution he no longer ministered as a bishop.

Ordained to the priesthood on 12 July 1967, Blaha was secretly ordained a bishop on 28 October 1967 because of the Communist Government of Czechoslovakia and the persecution of the Roman Catholic Church by the government. He secretly ordained as a bishop Felix Maria Davídek, who was his teacher in the clandestine Church.
