= General Paine =

General Paine may refer to:

- Charles Jackson Paine (1833–1916), Union Army brigadier general
- Eleazer A. Paine (1815–1882), Union Army brigadier general
- Godfrey Paine (1871–1932), Royal Air Force major general; also a Royal Navy admiral
- Halbert E. Paine (1826–1905), Union Army brigadier general and brevet major general

== See also ==
- Rollo Pain (1921–2005), British Army lieutenant general
- William Pain (1855–1924), British Army brigadier general
- General Payne (disambiguation)
