= Sarah Tomerlin Lee =

American writer, executive, and designer

- Born: 1910
- Died: 2001 (aged 90–91)
- Occupations: Author, retail executive, and interior designer

Sarah Tomerlin Lee (1910–2001) was an American magazine editor and author, retail executive, and interior designer.

== Early life ==
She graduated from Randolph-Macon woman's college and joined Bonwit Teller as a copywriter after college. She subsequently worked at Vogue, Harper's Bazaar, before moving on to Margaret Hockaday's advertising agency, and Lord & Taylor before succeeding Elizabeth Gordon at House Beautiful in 1964.

She led the interior design firm of Tom Lee, Ltd. from 1971 to 1993, and was head of the interior design division at the architectural firm of Beyer, Binder, Belle from 1993 until her retirement in 1997. Lee was responsible for the design of over forty hotels and inns in the United States.
