= Alanna Fields =

American multimedia artist

- Born: 1990 (age 35–36); Maryland, United States
- Style: Multimedia
- Website: alannafields.com

Alanna Fields (b.1990) is an American multimedia artist and archivist based in Brooklyn, New York.

== Early life and education ==
Fields was born in Upper Marlboro, Maryland, in 1990. She holds a BA in Literature from Trinity Washington University, and attended the Pratt Institute, graduating from the Photography MFA program in 2019.

== Work ==
Fields uses archival material in her work to explore how Black queer people have been represented historically. Her work uses photography, text and painting, and often uses wax to represent the way in which Black queer bodies and histories have been obfuscated. She has exhibited at the Museum of Contemporary African Diasporan Art, and Brooklyn's Photoville festival. Her work is held in the public collection of the Prince George’s African American Museum and Cultural Center. In 2021 she was commissioned by the New York Times Style Magazine to produce work about the effects of the pandemic on friendship. She was part of the 2021-22 cohort of artists at Silver Art Projects in New York. Fields is represented by the agency and studio Assembly.

== Awards ==
In 2018, she received the Gordon Parks Scholar Award, and was a 2020 Light Work Artist in Residence.

== Selected exhibitions ==
Solo

- Mirages of Dreams Past, Baxter Street at The Camera Club of New York, 2021

Group shows

- The Atlantic’s Inheritance: A Project About American History, Black Life, And The Resilience Of Memory, Photoville, 2021
- Assembly at EXPO CHGO Online, 2021
- 52 Artists: A Feminist Milestone, The Aldrich Contemporary Art Museum, 2022-2023
