= Margaret Hockaday =

American advertising executive

- Born: Margaret Elizabeth Hockaday; 1907
- Died: December 18, 1992 (aged 84–85); Manhattan
- Other names: Margaret LaFarge; Mig Hockaday; Mrs. L. Bancel LaFarge

Margaret Elizabeth Hockaday LaFarge (1907 – December 18, 1992) was an American executive who established the Hockaday Associates advertising firm in New York City in 1949.

== Career ==
Hockaday grew up in Wichita, Kansas and graduated from Vassar College in 1929. After college she started writing for Marshall Field, before moving on to Harper's Bazaar and Vogue. She then moved to Montgomery Ward and started working in mail order merchandise and brought fashion into the pages of the catalog. During World War II she taught social studies to teenagers at Columbia University's Lincoln School, and then moved back into fashion after the war by working at Holiday where her work included writing guides on what to wear at different social events. Her book "What to Wear Where" was a guide for fashionable travelers that she tried to have the staff at Holiday use as a clothing guide. The book became a popular mail order piece and Holiday bought the rights to the book and included it as a section for their readers. The book was also printed by and Bantam Books for sales in stores.

In 1949 she started the advertising firm Hockaday Associates with Alvin Chereskin serving as her art director. Hockaday Associates grew to an advertising firm located on Madison Avenue. The idea of pulling fashion and offbeat ideas into ads was a hallmark of Hockaday's work. By 1962, the firm had a staff of 40 people and was billing between $5 and $6 million per year. The first client of Hockaday Associates was the shoe company Capezio, and Hockaday describes the resulting ad campaign as "non-conformist mailing pieces and displays" which was centered on selling "a state of mind" rather than focusing on the details of the shoes. The ad campaign centered on finger painting of an animal called a Polka-Dotta without showing the shoes, which upset other advertising companies. The ads included the phrase "Are you mad enough for Capezios?" and was later expanded to stockings sold by Capezio.

Hockaday's subsequent clients included Fuller Fabrics and Dunbar Furniture. The advertising campaign for Dunbar Furniture started with an eight-foot sofa that was placed outside in a field, and started a trend of outdoor photography in advertising. One of the photographers working with Hockaday noted "it's gotten so that you can't even shoot a ham hock indoors any more". The photos for the Dunbar Furniture ad campaign were ultimately compiled into the book,The Dunbar book of contemporary furniture, that could also be purchased in stores. The work with Dunbar and other clients won awards from the Art Directors Club of New York; in 1956 work by Hockaday Associates included an award for distinctive merit and an art directors club medal for art director Alvin Chereskin's work. Hockaday Associates work was again shown in the 1961 edition Around this time, Hockaday was asked how advertising is changing and she was quoted as saying "With the trend to less copy ...advertising was never so good to look at".

In 1959 Hockaday won a new account with Jantzen, a swimwear company, after a presentation by her, Sarah Tomerlin Lee, and John Bryne. The ad campaign for Jantzen became known for the line "Just wear a smile and a Janzen" which was coined by Jean Ann Zuver while she worked at the Hockaday Agency. Hockaday later expanded to sell shoes for Janzten. When talking about this success, Hockaday noted "I don't like to think of women in advertising as such...after all, if we are doing a good job we should be accepted solely as good advertising people or a good agency".

Hockaday's other work included the paper company Crane & Co, establishing mail-order catalogues for the French Boot Shop (FBS), Martex Towels, and an anti-smoking campaign funded by the American Cancer Society that targeted 5th and 6th graders with the Huffless, Puffless Dragon. In 1960, during the ad campaign for the paper company Crane & Co, Hockaday presented a lifestyle that encouraged people to write more letters, but did so without presenting images of the stationery itself. The owner of a house shown in one of the ads made his displeasure about this ad campaign known in a letter written to The New Yorker magazine. Hockaday Associates also composed and illustrated the ad campaign for Grants whiskey, which featured the line "As long as your up, get me a Grant's" and showed on men in elegant chairs placed in different locations.

== Personal life ==
Hockaday was married to the architect L. Bancel LaFarge, and lived in New York and Nantucket. After Hockaday's death in 1992, furniture previously located in Hockaday's personal apartment in New York that had been used in different advertising campaigns was shown within a 2010 magazine article presenting the house of Hockaday's niece, Susan Hockaday.
