= Governor's Guards =

Connecticut State Guard
- Active: 1771 – Present
- Country: United States
- Allegiance: Connecticut
- Branch: State Defense Force
- Type: Foot Guards, Horse Guards
- Role: Public Duties

The Governor's Guards of Connecticut are four distinct units of the Connecticut State Guard, a part of the organized militia under the Connecticut State Militia. There are two foot guard units and two horse guard units. All four units are formed fully of volunteers and serve under the authority of the Connecticut Adjutant General and the Governor of the State of Connecticut, who serves as the Guards' Commander-in-Chief.

== History ==
Four Connecticut Governor's Guards companies were raised during colonial times to serve and protect the Governor on his travels between New Haven and Hartford, both of which served as state capitals until 1875, as well as escort dignitaries traveling throughout the state. One foot guard unit and one horse guard unit served the Hartford area, and the other two the New Haven area.

- The First Company Governor's Foot Guard was created in 1771 with a Second Company raised in 1775. The First Company Governor's Foot Guard is the oldest American military formation in the United States with an unbroken lineage.
- The First Company Governor's Horse Guards was organized in 1778 and chartered in 1788. It is the oldest, continuously active mounted cavalry unit in the United States.
- The Second Company Governor's Horse Guard was organized in 1808 in New Haven.

=== First Company Governor's Foot Guard ===
A Governor's Guard private (center) in 1774–1775

The First Company Governor's Foot Guard (1GFG) was raised in Hartford in October 1771 as the Governor's Guard and is the oldest American military unit in continuous existence. Although other units may have been formed at an earlier date, the First Company is unique in its record of unbroken service. In 1771 Hartford was remote from larger towns. It was a small town of 3,000 inhabitants, with few churches and schools. The journey to New York or Boston took three days in a stagecoach which ran but once a week. Small as it was, Hartford was not lacking in public spirit.

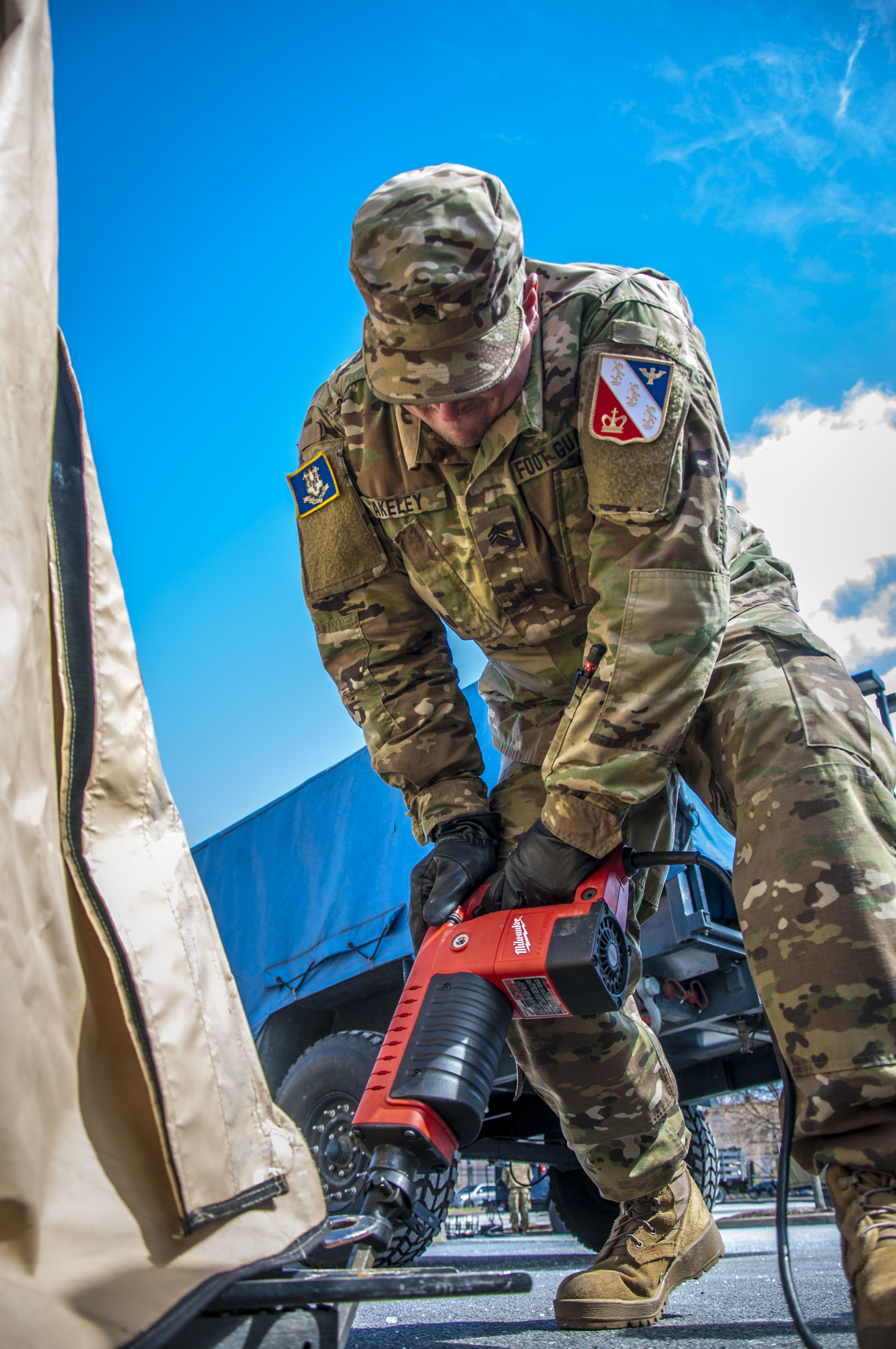
A 1GFG sergeant drilling a pilot hole in Hartford, March 23, 2020

A group of leading young men in Hartford decided it was time to organize a militia unit for the purpose of escorting the governor and General Assembly at the general elections after an incident in 1768, when a "trainband" made a farce out of the escort duty. Certainly another reason for the decision was that a company from East Hartford actually did escort duty in 1769 and 1770. Accordingly, Samuel Wyllys and others petitioned the General Assembly. The petition was granted by the Assembly, and Samuel Wyllys, a young man of 32, was elected Captain, William Knox, Lieutenant, and Ebenezer Austin, Ensign. The company was known at this time as the Governor's Guard.

The ceremonial uniform of the First Company, as far as can be determined, is substantially the same as the original one, although it has picked up elements from different time periods over the years. Tradition hold that the original uniform was copied from that of the British Army's Coldstream Regiment of Foot Guards, the personal bodyguard of Queen Charlotte. The uniform consists of a scarlet coat, the tails of which are faced with buff, and a black velvet frond crossed with silver braid. The vest and breeches are of buff, and the leggings are black velvet. The hat, or 'busby' as it is known, is of bear skin with a shield in front bearing the State Coat of Arms and supports a red and black feather plume on the side. Enlisted men wear white cross straps. Sergeants dispense with the cross straps and wear a white belt, sword and shoulder scales. Officers wear a black and silver belt, fringed epaulets, and carry a saber instead of a sword.

The First Company Governor's Foot Guard has been closely connected with many historical events. In 1777, although not obligated to do so, it resolved to join the patriot army at Saratoga. As an advance guard of reinforcements under Captain Jonathon Bull, they were crossing the Rhineback Flats on their way to Saratoga when they were met by a messenger with the good news of Burgoyne's surrender.

=== Second Company Governor's Foot Guard ===
It was not long before citizens of New Haven, Connecticut's other capital, felt the need to establish a unit of Governor's Guards composed of their own citizens. The Second Company was organized in New Haven primarily by Benedict Arnold who was elected the company's captain. This caused the original unit to take the name First Company Governor's Guard and the new organization to take the name Second Company Governor's Guards. It was in 1778, with the establishment of a unit of Governor's Horse Guards, that the original unit changed its name for the final time to "First Company Governor's Foot Guard" and the newer unit adopted the name "Second Company Governor's Foot Guard". Both units of Foot Guard are recognized by the state of Connecticut as separate and distinct entities.

Earlier, at the start of the American War of Independence recognizing that members of the Second Company Governor's Guards were keen to travel to Massachusetts where the fighting had begun at Lexington and Concord, the colonial authorities wished the Guards to remain at home and kept their weapons locked up. On April 22, 1775, Captain Benedict Arnold called his men together at a tavern and successfully demanded the keys to the magazine for his company's weapons or else they would break into the storehouse. He reportedly stated, "None but the Almighty God shall prevent my marching." This event is commemorated on Powder House Day.

During the American Civil War, men of the 2nd Company formed Company "K" 6th Connecticut Volunteers and fought in 26 battles in the conflict.

The New Haven Armory served as the home of the 2nd Company from about 1930 until 2010.

=== First Company Governor's Horse Guards ===
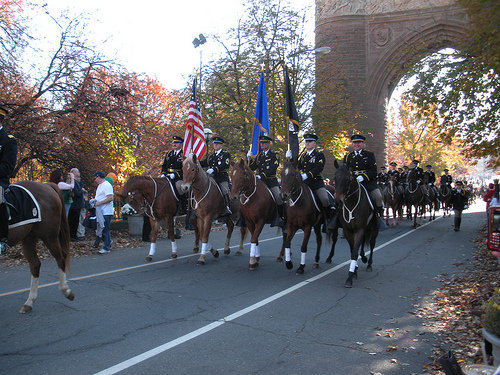
The First Company Governor's Horse Guards march in full dress blues on parade in downtown Hartford, passing under the Soldiers and Sailors Memorial Arch.

==== 1658–1777 ====
An organization of mounted troopers for the purposes of escorting dignitaries and others throughout Connecticut has been a tradition since 1658. The first cavalry 'horse guard' troop in Connecticut consisted of 37 men and horses from Hartford and surrounding towns, organized under Major John Mason, the colonies' military chief. Their uniforms were styled after the "Oxford Blues" of England's Royal Regiment of Horse Guards, and their shoulder patch was the winged thunderbolt. Captain Richard Lord, who came to Hartford in 1636 from England, led the troop. Lord was succeeded by Captain Samuel Talcott in 1687, who commanded "the troop of horse of that county" when they "conducted [Andros] honorably, from the ferry, through Wethersfield, up to Hartford." Andros visited Connecticut to purloin its charter, which was according to legend hidden in a large oak tree to prevent him from getting it.

==== 1778–1840 ====
Captain Thomas Y. Seymour, an officer in the Continental Army, organized the Horse Guards in 1778 upon his resignation from the army and return to Hartford. Members were private citizens, many veterans of the Revolutionary War, and within ten years, the organization had grown to a point where it petitioned the governor to become an organized "troop of volunteer Horse, or Light Dragoons." The petition was ratified and the "Governor's Independent, volunteer Troop of Horse Guards" was chartered on May 19, 1788, with Capt. John Caldwell and First LT Thomas Seymour at the helm, who served as the company's first two commandants, respectively. The Troop's first headquarters was an armory at Arch and Main streets in Hartford.

The Horse Guards escorted prominent individuals, including Connecticut's Governors and others, such as George Washington on October 19, 1789 (Wethersfield to Hartford) President John Adams on August 2, 1798 (escorted from Wethersfield to Hartford); President James Monroe on June 23, 1817 (escorted from Wethersfield to Hartford); General The Marquis de Lafayette in September 1824 (escorted from Vernon to Hartford); and President Andrew Jackson (escorted through Hartford beginning "north on Main to Morgan, to Front, to State, to Asylum, to Trumbull, to Pearl, to Prospect, to school").

The uniform during this period was described as "a bear skin dragoon hat, white broadcloth coat brilliant with lace and braid of gold, red belt above tight pants, and boots with yellow tops."

==== 1840–1911 ====
The troop suffered from a period of inactivity during the 1840s; they did not appear to escort anyone or participate in any drills, parades including inaugurals, or other public events. Wishing to revive the Troop, some Hartford citizens began a new Horse Guard, adopting the 1788 charter, with Col. Samuel Colt, inventor of the Colt revolver and grandson of John Caldwell, elected as commandant. However, unbeknownst to anyone, the Horse Guards was still in existence, with Major Henry Boardman serving as commandant. Eventually, when both Horse Guards petitioned to be recognized as the 'true' First Company, the Governor acknowledged Boardman's Horse Guards, forcing Colt to direct his troop under a new name. After all the confusion, Boardman quickly resumed the troop's activities, escorting presidents and governors.

At this time, the troop's uniform consisted of a "bear-skin cap ornamented with a rosette and gilt eagle, dark blue single breasted coat with brass buttons, and trousers of sky blue doeskin with straps under the instep; all trimmed with orange colored piping."

==== 1911–1919 ====
When the Connecticut General Assembly passed an act authorizing both units of the Governor's Horse Guards to re-organize as cavalry in the Connecticut National Guard, the First Company delayed due to some opposition. It did eventually reorganize as Troop B Cavalry, C.N.G., since the Second Company Governor's Horse Guards had reorganized first as Troop A Cavalry. Troop B then began the long and hard training process designed to bring it in line with federal cavalry standards.

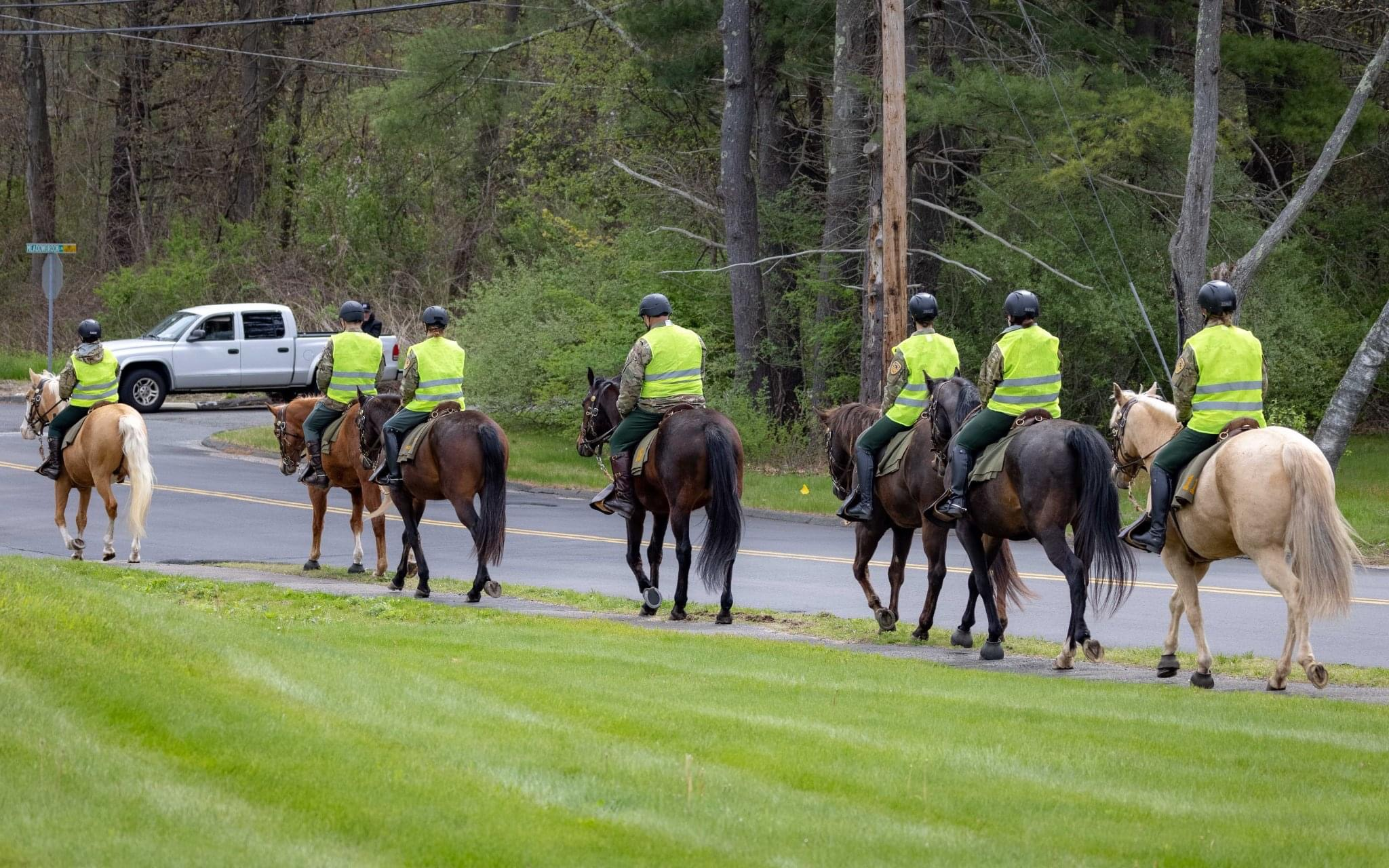
Members of the First Company Governor's Horse Guards participate in road rides like this one to desensitize the horses to cars and activity as well as to bring goodwill and visit with community organizations such as local schools and nursing homes.

During 1911, Troop B raised money for a new armory, including stables and a drill shed, which was built between 1912 and 1913 on Farmington Avenue in West Hartford. It still stands today as a commercial building of offices called 'The Armory.'

On June 18, 1916, President Woodrow Wilson activated the National Guard troops in response to an attack by Pancho Villa on New Mexico, and deployed Troop B to the Mexican border at Nogales and Arivaca, Arizona, where they remained for several months guarding the border. Capt. John Henry Kelso Davis, a Trinity College graduate, was the commander of this operation.

On April 6, 1917, less than six months after Troop B returned from Arizona, President Wilson declared war on Germany. Troop B was split into two Troops, B and L, and ordered to recruit to war strength. Troops B and L were drafted into federal service on August 5, 1917, and became the 101st Machine Gun Battalion, 26th Division. They served in France at Chemin des Dames, Toul, the Champagne-Marne Defensive, the Aisne-Marne Offensive, the St. Mihiel Offensive, the Troyon Sector, and the Meuse-Argonne Offensive, before returning to America in April 1919 and being demobilized.

After World War I, in 1919, the unit was reorganized as Troop B of the 122nd Cavalry, Connecticut National Guard.

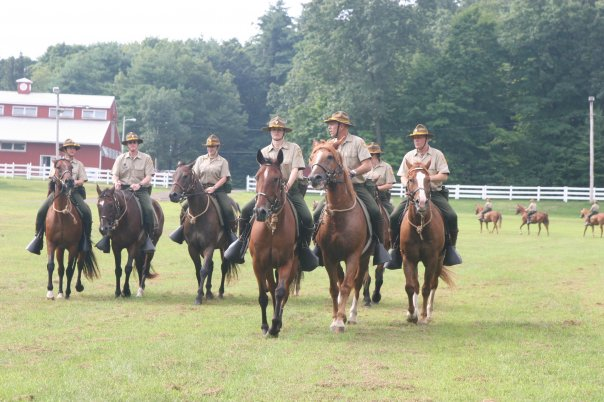
Troopers in First and Second Horse practice mounted drill formations every Thursday night at their respective drill fields, utilizing centuries-old cavalry commands and traditions. Here, a squad in First Horse practices a squad wedge.

==== 1940–1945 ====
In May 1940, Troops Band A were federalized as part of the 1st Battalion of the 208th Coast Artillery Anti-Aircraft (AAA), which was called to active duty three days after Pearl Harbor as the 745th Antiaircraft Artillery Gun Battalion. The 745th was stationed at Townsville, Queensland, Australia.

Back home in Connecticut, the Troop operated, trained, and drilled a "Home Guard" which consisted of two troops that remained active during WWII in Avon, Connecticut.

==== 1946–Present ====
Troop B C.N.G. ceased to function in 1946 as a National Guard Unit, and the First Company Governor's Horse Guards once again became part of the Organized Militia of the State of Connecticut as a "self-sustaining unit in its military operations."

In 1955, the First Company relocated to its current location, Arch Road in Avon, CT, a property that encompasses over 37 acres of riding trails, a drill field, a 50-stall stable, and two outdoor riding rings. It has kept the same Charter that was accepted in 1788, and refers to its by-laws for all troop functions and positions. The Troop's activities consist of various ceremonial duties: parading, providing personnel and horses for dedication ceremonies, escorting dignitaries, and attending inaugural celebrations for the Governor of the State and, on several occasions in recent years, the President of the United States. The First Company Governor's Horse Guards holds drill every Thursday evening, during which the riding platoon practices mounted drill formations and equitation. Training for new recruits takes place once or twice per year and lasts 16 weeks, in which recruits are trained in military bearing, drill and ceremony, horsemanship, horse care, and cavalry traditions. Volunteers who seek to become recruits must be between 18 and 60 years of age and a United States citizen, and no prior military or horse experience is required.

==== Horses ====
The horses of the First Company Governor's Horse Guards are geldings of sound health and temperament in brown, chestnut, or bay coloring between 15 and 16hh. They are often donated to the troop by private owners or purchased using troop funds, whereupon they become property of the Connecticut Military Department. Breeds vary and include Quarter Horses, Standardbreds, and Thoroughbreds.

=== Second Company Governor's Horse Guard ===
The Second Company Governor's Horse Guard was chartered in 1808, as the New Haven area horse guard unit in the state. It is housed in Newtown, Connecticut and performs ceremonial and community functions, among which have been the development of a therapeutic riding program.

== Present day ==
All four units of the Governor's Guards remain active today as subordinate units of the Connecticut Military Department under the command & control of the Connecticut Adjutant General. Their mission today remains primarily ceremonial, but they can be called up to active service to augment the Connecticut National Guard for state emergency operations. They perform their annual training each August at Camp Nett in East Lyme. Over the years, the location of their headquarters has changed due to space availability and financial costs. Currently, the headquarters are as follows:

- First Company Governor's Foot Guard - Hartford
- Second Company Governor's Foot Guard - Branford
- First Company Governor's Horse Guard - Avon
- Second Company Governor's Horse Guard - Newtown

=== COVID-19 Pandemic Response ===
In March and April 2020, members of the Foot and Horse Guards were activated to assist the Army and Air National Guard, as well as the Connecticut Department of Public Health in configuring and staging their Mobile Field Hospital amid the COVID-19 pandemic. The units periodically train in the practice of assembling and takedown of the mobile field hospitals at Camp Hartell in Windsor Locks.

== See also ==
- Connecticut Wing Civil Air Patrol
- National Lancers
- Naval militia
- United States Coast Guard Auxiliary
