= New Haven Armory =

- U.S. National Register of Historic Places
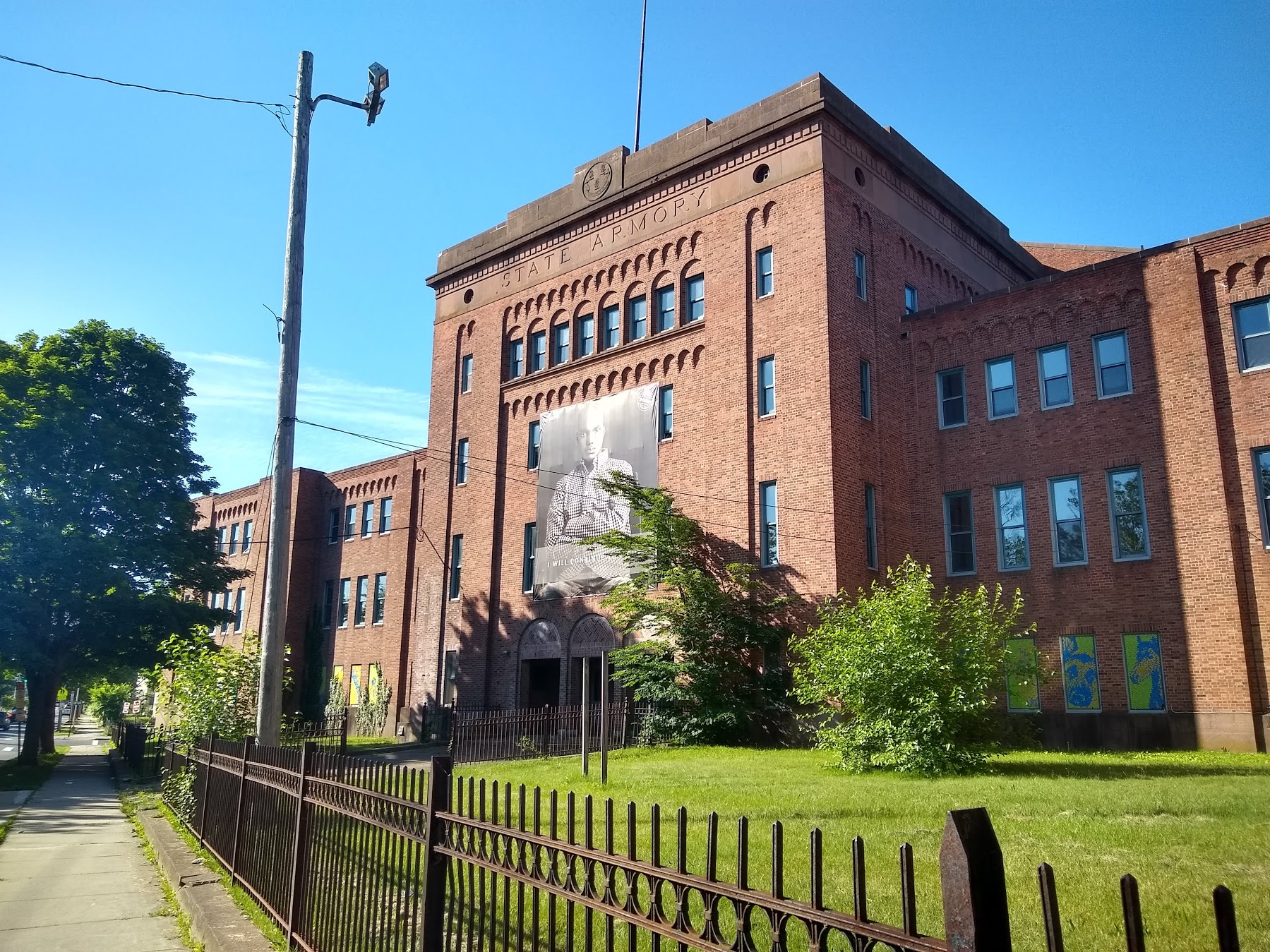

- Location within Connecticut Location within the United States
- Location: 270-290 Goffe Street, New Haven, Connecticut
- Coordinates: 41.3187°N 72.9391°W
- Area: 2.2 acres (0.89 ha)
- Built: 1930
- Architect: Payne and Keefe
- Architectural style: Romanesque revival
- NRHP reference No.: 100006556
- Added to NRHP: May 19, 2021

The New Haven Armory (also known as the Goffe Street Armory) is a historic building at 270–290 Goffe Street in the Dixwell neighborhood of New Haven, Connecticut, United States. Developed between 1928 and 1930, the armory served the Connecticut National Guard and the Second Company Governor's Foot Guard. It has also served as a venue for concerts, events, and other civic functions in the community.

== Description and history ==
The building was designed by Payne and Keefe. It is a fortress-like structure with a red brick exterior in a Romanesque revival style. The building consists of three main parts: a vast vaulted drill hall, a surrounding U-shaped head house, and an extending wing on the west. The four-story entry tower of the headhouse dominates the facade, with "state armory" engraved near the top. The building features basket-weave brickwork, arches, corbelling, and a molded cornice. The enormous 150,000 square feet (14,000 m^{2}) interior space has meeting rooms, offices, lounges, and a lobby area. The drill hall is 30,560 square feet (2,839 m^{2}) of unobstructed space and features a web of steel trusses spanning the ceiling.

The building has served as a venue for dog, antique, and boat shows. It also hosted exhibitions and concerts, with artists including Frank Sinatra, and the Tommy Dorsey Band. A home show held at the armory in the 1940s included a full-sized Cape Cod house. It played a role during the New Haven Black Panther trials in 1970 as the staging ground for the National Guard response to protests. Annual "Black Expos" were held at the armory in the 1970s to promote and discuss economic, political, and social concerns important to the African-American community.

Ownership was transferred to the City of New Haven in 2009 when both guard units moved to other facilities and the armory was deemed surplus. Efforts to secure funds for the building renovation to serve the community are ongoing. The property was listed on the National Register of Historic Places in 2021.

== See also ==
- National Register of Historic Places listings in New Haven, Connecticut
