= Thomas Sergeant La Farge =

American artist

- Born: 1904; Paris, France
- Died: 1942 (aged 37–38); Atlantic Ocean
- Known for: Muralist
- Parent(s): Bancel La Farge; Mabel Hooper La Farge
- Relatives: Tom La Farge (cousin once removed)

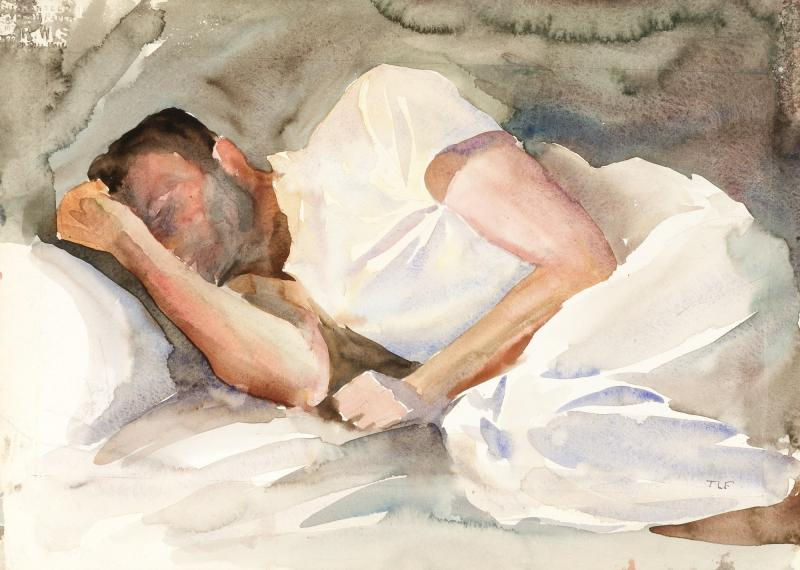
Portrait Study, c. 1931

Thomas Sergeant La Farge (1904–1942) was an American artist known for his WPA mural paintings for the United States Post Office in New London, Connecticut.

== Biography ==
La Farge was born in Paris, France in 1904. He was the son of the artist Bancel La Farge and Mabel Hooper La Farge. His grandfather was the artist John La Farge.

In 1933 La Farge was commissioned by the Public Works of Art Project to create a six panel series of murals for the lobby of the New London Main Post Office. The murals depicted ships, sailors and whaling. The completed murals were installed in 1938 by the Treasury Relief Art Project

La Farge died at sea in 1942 while serving in the United States Coast Guard. The ship he was commanding, USCGC Natsek, sank during a storm off the Canadian coast. The Smithsonian lists La Farge's death year as 1943, and the National Gallery lists the death year as 1940. The Frick Art Reference Library lists his death year as 1942. The Natsek sunk in December 1942 and was declared officially lost in 1944 and that the entire crew died "in the line of duty on or after 17 December 1942".

La Farge's work is in the collection of the National Gallery of Art and the Smithsonian American Art Museum. His work was included in the 2012 exhibition "America @ Work: New Deal Murals in New London and Beyond" at the Lyman Allyn Art Museum.
