= Miriam Therese Winter =

American Roman Catholic religious sister, theologian, writer and songwriter (born 1938)

Miriam Therese Winter MMS (born Gloria Winter; 1938]) is a Roman Catholic Medical Mission Sister, theologian, writer and songwriter. Her hymns include "Joy Is Like the Rain" (1966), "Knock Knock" (1968), and "Wellspring of Wisdom" (1989).

== Education ==
Miriam Therese Winter earned her B.A. in music from Catholic University, her master's degree in religious education from McMaster Divinity College, and a Ph.D. in liturgical studies from Princeton Theological Seminary.

As a Medical Mission Sister, Winter has worked along the Thai-Cambodian border and in Ethiopia at refugee camps. Winter has also traveled to communities in Botswana, Ghana, Uganda and Kenya, and India to spread her music as well as performing in the United States, Canada, Australia and New Zealand.

She currently teaches at Hartford Seminary (now Hartford International University for Religion and Peace) as Professor of Liturgy, Worship, Spirituality and Feminist Studies. Here, Winter founded the Women's Leadership Institute and teaches courses using ecumenical and cross-cultural emphases in theory and in practice, and developing feminist and multifaith approaches that have culminated in a quantum perspective.

== Honors and awards ==
Winter also holds honorary doctorates from the University of Hartford, Mount Saint Vincent University and Albertus Magnus College.

== Selected discography ==
"Joy Is Like the Rain" was published by Vanguard Records in 1965, before Vatican II. The song was released on September 30, 1966, as part of the Medical Mission Sisters' album Joy is Like the Rain. The album contains 12 tracks. Sister Winter says that no matter where she travelled, the song arrived before her.

"Knock Knock" was similarly popular was released in 1968 and in published in 1982 in An Anthology of Scripture Songs (Medical Missions Sisters, 1982)

== Selected books ==
- Paradoxology: Spirituality in a Quantum Universe (2009) Orbis Books
- Out of the Depths: The Story of Ludmila Javorová, Ordained Roman Catholic Priest (2001) Crossroad
- The Singer and the Song: An Autobiography of the Spirit (1999) Orbis Books
- The Chronicles of Noah and Her Sisters: Genesis and Exodus According to Women (1995) Crossroad
- Defecting in Place: Women Claiming Responsibility for Their Own Spiritual Lives (1994) Crossroad (Catholic Press Association Second Place Award for Books on Gender Studies in 1995)
- The Gospel According to Mary: A New Testament for Women (1993) Crossroad
