= Trinity Washington University =

Catholic university in Washington, D.C.

Coordinates: 38.9275°N 77.004872°W

- Former name: Trinity College (1897–2004)
- Type: Private university
- Established: 1897 (128 years ago)
- Accreditation: MSCHE
- Affiliations: Sisters of Notre Dame de Namur
- Religious affiliation: Catholic Church
- Academic affiliations: ACCU; NAICU; CUWMA
- President: Patricia McGuire
- Students: 1,800
- Location: Washington, D.C., United States
- Colors: Purple and gold
- Nickname: Tigers
- Sporting affiliations: USCAA
- Mascot: Tiger
- Website: www.trinitydc.edu

Trinity Washington University is a private Catholic university in Washington, D.C., United States. It was founded as Trinity College by the Sisters of Notre Dame de Namur in 1897 as the nation's first Catholic liberal arts college for women. Trinity was chartered by an Act of Congress on August 20, 1897. An elite collegian institution in its early life, the college faced declining enrollment by the 1980s. It began recruiting local underprivileged students. It was renamed Trinity Washington University in 2004.

Trinity enrolls more than 1,800 students in its undergraduate and graduate programs in the College of Arts and Sciences, School of Nursing and Health Professions, School of Education, School of Business and Graduate Studies, and School of Professional Studies. Trinity's student body in 2020 includes about 95% ethnic minorities, including about 65% Black/African American and 30% Latino/Hispanic. Trinity is designated by the U.S. Department of Education as a Minority Serving Institution and is the only university in the D.C. region, as well as one of only a few in the nation, designated as both a Predominantly Black Institution (PBI) and Hispanic Serving Institution (HSI). Trinity has a 97% acceptance rate, with 35% of students graduating.

== History ==
After its founding in 1897 as the nation's first Catholic liberal arts college for women by the Sisters of Notre Dame de Namur, Trinity educated middle-class Catholic women, who were underrepresented in America's colleges, for more than 70 years. (For more background on women's higher education, see Origins and types of Women's colleges in the United States.)

When many all-male colleges became co-ed, Trinity's full-time enrollment dropped from 1,000 in 1969 to 300 in 1989. The school's 12th president, Donna Jurick, responded in the early 1980s by opening a weekend college for working women from the District of Columbia, a racially diverse population the school had previously not served. The first such program in Washington, it became very popular; within three years, it had more students than the undergraduate program.

Under Patricia McGuire, a Trinity alumna who became college president in 1989, Trinity reached out to the Black and Hispanic women of Washington. McGuire split the college into three schools. The historic women's college became the College of Arts and Sciences; the higher-revenue teacher college became the School of Education; and the continuing education classes were folded into a School of Professional Studies. Trinity began recruiting at D.C. high schools and expanded the professional schools, whose combined enrollment rose from 639 in 1989 to 974 in 1999.

In 2004, the college gained university status and became Trinity Washington University.

== Academics ==
=== Five schools ===
Trinity has an annual enrollment of more than 1,800 students in the university's five schools, which offer undergraduate and graduate degrees.

- The College of Arts and Sciences—Trinity's historic women's school—offers community service opportunities, athletics, student clubs, and campus activities. The College of Arts and Sciences offers a number of undergraduate academic programs, including international affairs, criminal justice, forensic psychology, journalism, and business economics.
- Trinity's School of Education is a coeducational graduate program offering degrees in education, counseling, curriculum design, and educational administration. Through its Continuing Education Program, the School of Education also offers professional development courses enrolling 4,000 education professionals each year.
- The School of Professional Studies offers undergraduate degrees designed for women and men seeking to advance or change their careers.
- The School of Business and Graduate Studies encompasses the graduate degree programs of Master of Business Administration (M.B.A.), Master of Science Administration (M.S.A.), and Strategic Communication and Public Relations (M.A.).
- The School of Nursing and Health Professions is home to Trinity's nursing program, which is accredited by Commission on Collegiate Nursing Education. It also offers Master's degrees of Occupational Therapy, Science in Nursing, and Public Health.

=== Special academic programs ===
Trinity offers professional programs at a satellite classroom located at THEARC, a multipurpose community facility in Southeast Washington — the only private university to offer college degree programs in the District of Columbia's underserved neighborhoods east of the Anacostia River.

=== Rankings ===
In 2024, U S News & World Report ranked Trinity #133-#175 out of 181 Regional Universities North.

== Student body ==
Of Trinity's more than 1,800 students, 95% were persons of color, including about 65% Black/African American and 30% Latina/Hispanic as of 2020. Ninety-four percent of the students are women. About 80% of full-time undergraduates are eligible for Pell Grants, with a median family income of roughly $25,000. Slightly more than 100 Trinity students are undocumented immigrants.

For 2023, according to the U.S. Department of Education, Trinity had a 97% acceptance rate with 35% of students graduating, 33% transferring, 30% withdrawing, and 2% still enrolled.

Trinity is designated by the U.S. Department of Education as a Minority Serving Institution and is the only university in the D.C. region, and one of only a few in the nation, designated as both a Predominantly Black Institution and Hispanic Serving Institution.

Trinity's 2020–21 tuition for a full-time undergraduate is $24,860 for a full year. All full-time undergraduate students in the College of Arts and Sciences receive a scholarship between $10,000 and $15,000. About 80% of the undergraduate students receive Pell Grants and most D.C. students receive D.C. TAG (D.C. Tuition Assistance Grant). With additional grants and loans, the average student pays $1,000 to $2,000 out-of-pocket for tuition.

== Athletics ==
The Trinity Washington athletic teams are called the Tigers. The university is a member in the United States Collegiate Athletic Association (USCAA). They previously competed as a member in the Division III ranks of the National Collegiate Athletic Association (NCAA), primarily competing as an NCAA D-III Independent from 2015–16 to 2025–26 (which they were in a previous stint from 2007–08 to 2011–12). The Tigers previously competed in these defunct conferences: the Great South Athletic Conference (GSAC) from 2012–13 to 2014–15; and the Atlantic Women's Colleges Conference (AWCC) as a founding member from 1995–96 to 2006–07.

Trinity Washington competes in five intercollegiate varsity sports: basketball, lacrosse, soccer, tennis, and volleyball.

=== Facilities ===
The Trinity Center for Women and Girls in Sports was completed in 2003. It features a basketball arena; walking track; swimming pool; spa; fitness center with weight machines, free weights and cardio equipment and dance studio; tennis courts; and an athletic field. It is free for Trinity students and offers memberships to local residents.

== Campus buildings ==
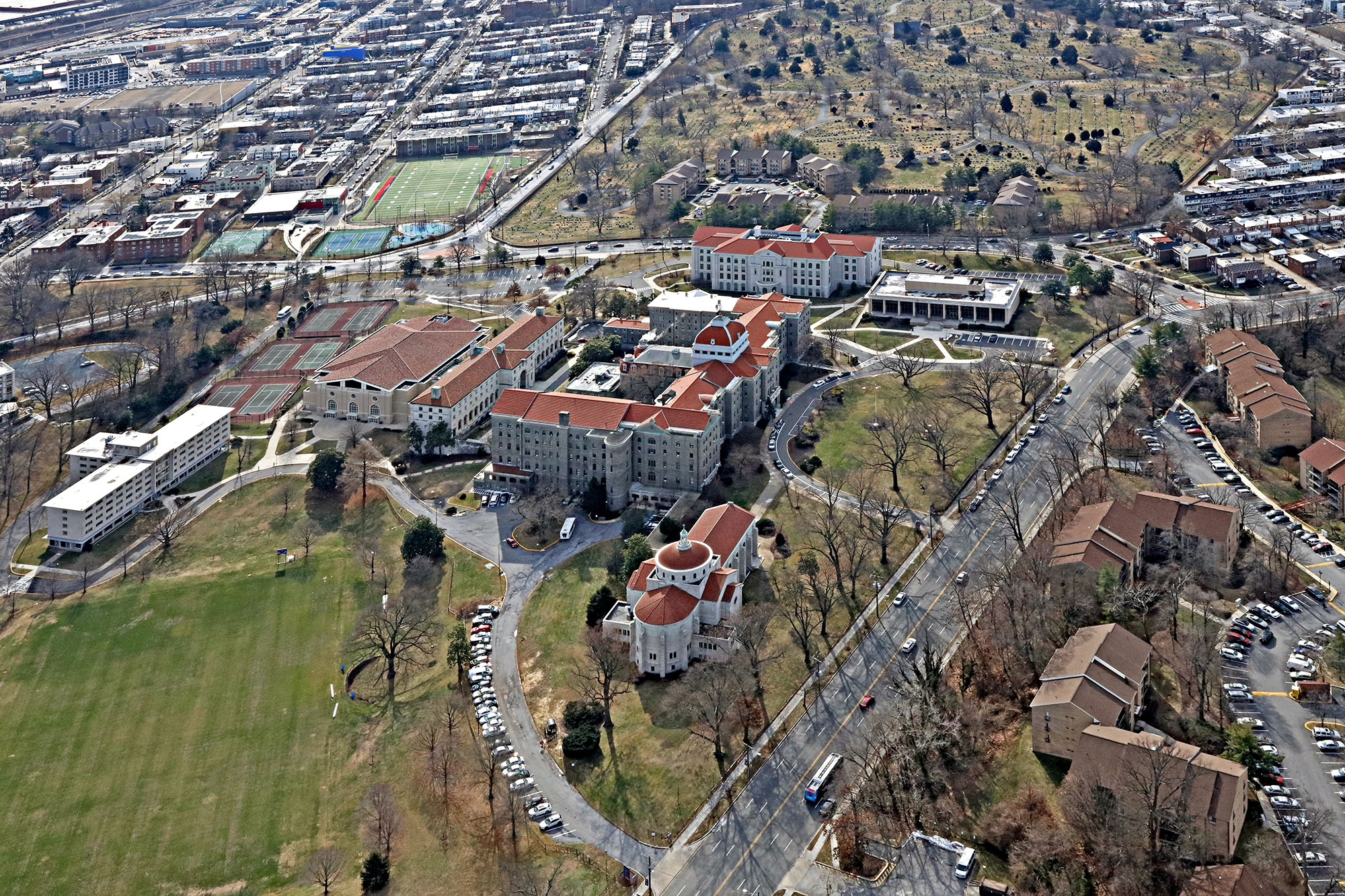
Trinity Washington University

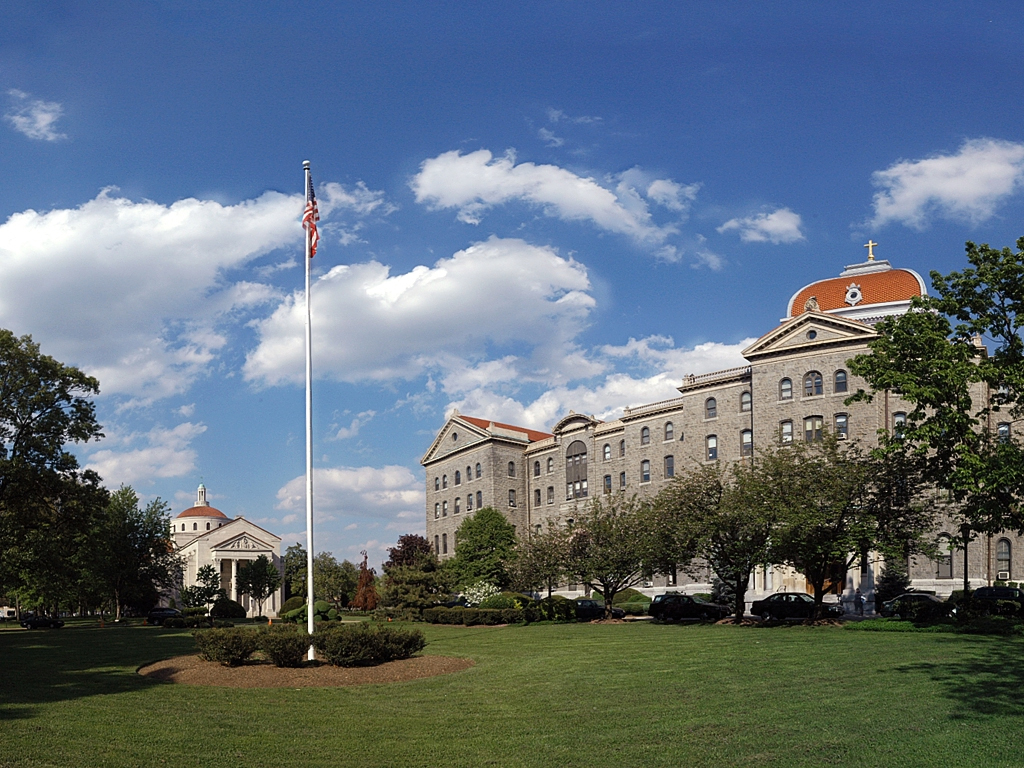
Main Hall, designed by Edwin Forrest Durang.

The campus includes the following buildings:

- Main Hall, which houses most of the administrative offices on campus, many faculty offices and classrooms, as well as the university's admissions office, O'Connor Auditorium, and bookstore.
- Payden Academic Center, opened in 2016, has nursing and science labs, classrooms for all disciplines and Trinity's technology hub.
- Kerby Hall is a residence hall. In the 1980s, it was a residence hall for graduate students of other colleges in Washington, D.C., including Robert Casey, who studied law at Catholic University of America and later became a U.S. Senator from Pennsylvania.
- Notre Dame Chapel hosts many of Trinity's traditions, including Academic Convocation, Freshman Medal Ceremony, Cap and Gown Mass, and Baccalaureate Mass. Dedicated in 1924, it was designed by the architectural firm Maginnis and Walsh and won a national architecture award for ecclesiastical architecture from the American Institute of Architects. It was restored in 1997 and features Guastavino tiles, stained glass windows by Charles Jay Connick and a mosaic by Bancel LaFarge. The chapel hosted the pope during his 1979 visit to the United States.

== Notable alumni ==
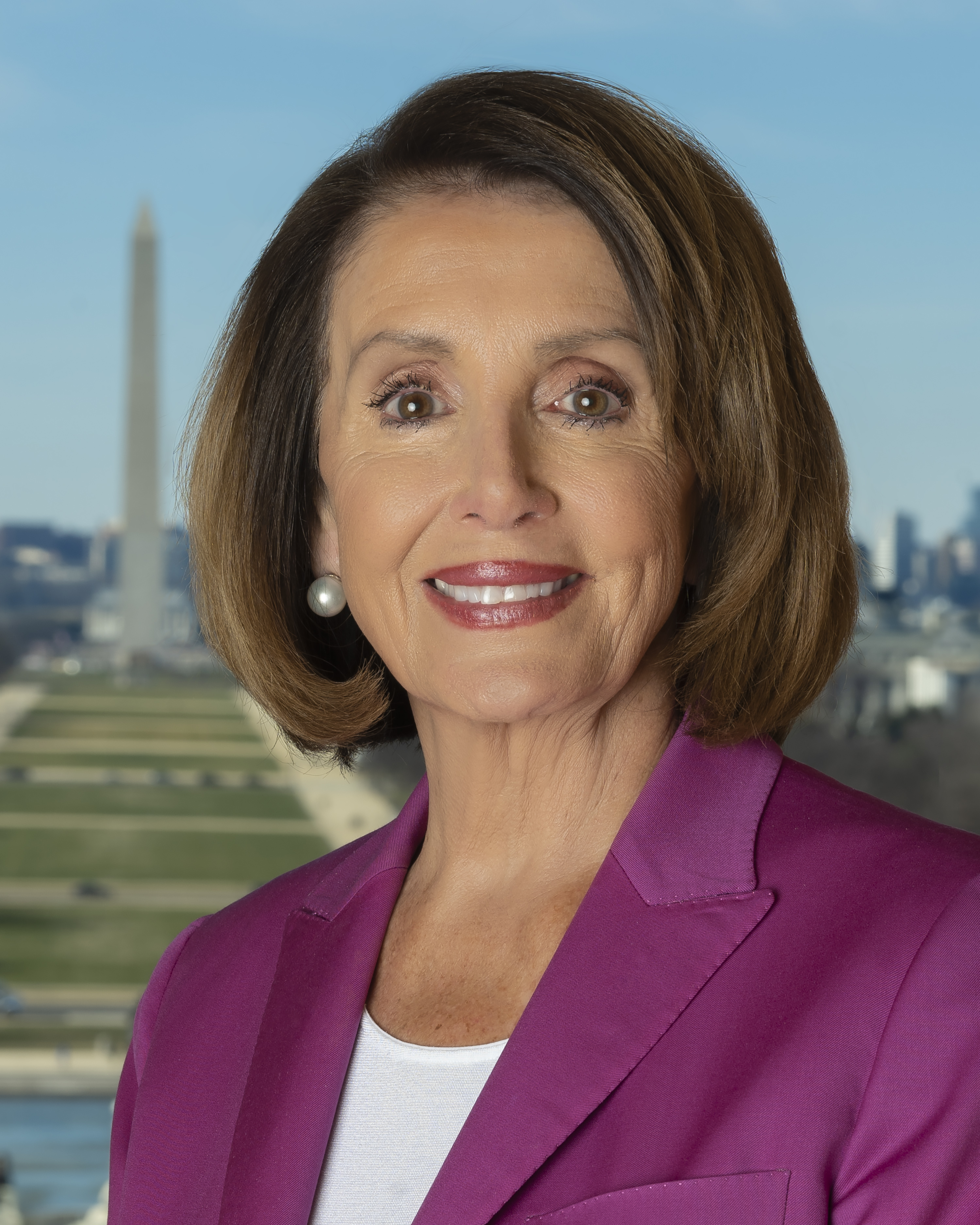
Nancy Pelosi, former Speaker of the United States House of Representatives, class of 1962

- Joy Ford Austin, former executive director of Humanities DC
- Cathie Black, former chairman of Hearst Magazines
- Rosemary M. Collyer, Senior United States district judge of the United States District Court for the District of Columbia; former Presiding Judge of the United States Foreign Intelligence Surveillance Court
- Kellyanne Conway, former Counselor to the President to Donald Trump, and campaign strategist during his 2016 presidential campaign
- Claire Eagan, Chief Judge on United States District Court for the Northern District of Oklahoma
- Cynthia Eagle Russett, intellectual historian at Yale University
- Alanna Fields, multimedia artist and archivist
- Regina Flannery Herzfeld, anthropologist
- Sister Joan Frances Gormley, consecrated virgin who was a noted biblical scholar and translator
- Barbara B. Kennelly, former U.S. Representative from Connecticut
- Maria Leavey, political strategist
- Jane Dammen McAuliffe, former President, Bryn Mawr College
- Patricia McGuire, current President, Trinity Washington University
- Caryle Murphy, Pulitzer Prize-winning reporter, The Washington Post
- Eileen Niedfield, physician and missionary.
- Nancy Pelosi (Class of 1962), former Speaker of the United States House of Representatives
- Noris Salazar Allen, Panamanian bryologist
- Kathleen Sebelius, former United States Secretary of Health and Human Services; former Governor of Kansas
- M. Patricia Smith, former Commissioner of the New York State Department of Labor
- Maggie Williams, former campaign manager to Hillary Clinton
