= Anna Maria Dengel =

Austrian doctor, Religious Sister and foundress (1892–1980)

Mother Anna Maria Dengel, S.C.M.M.
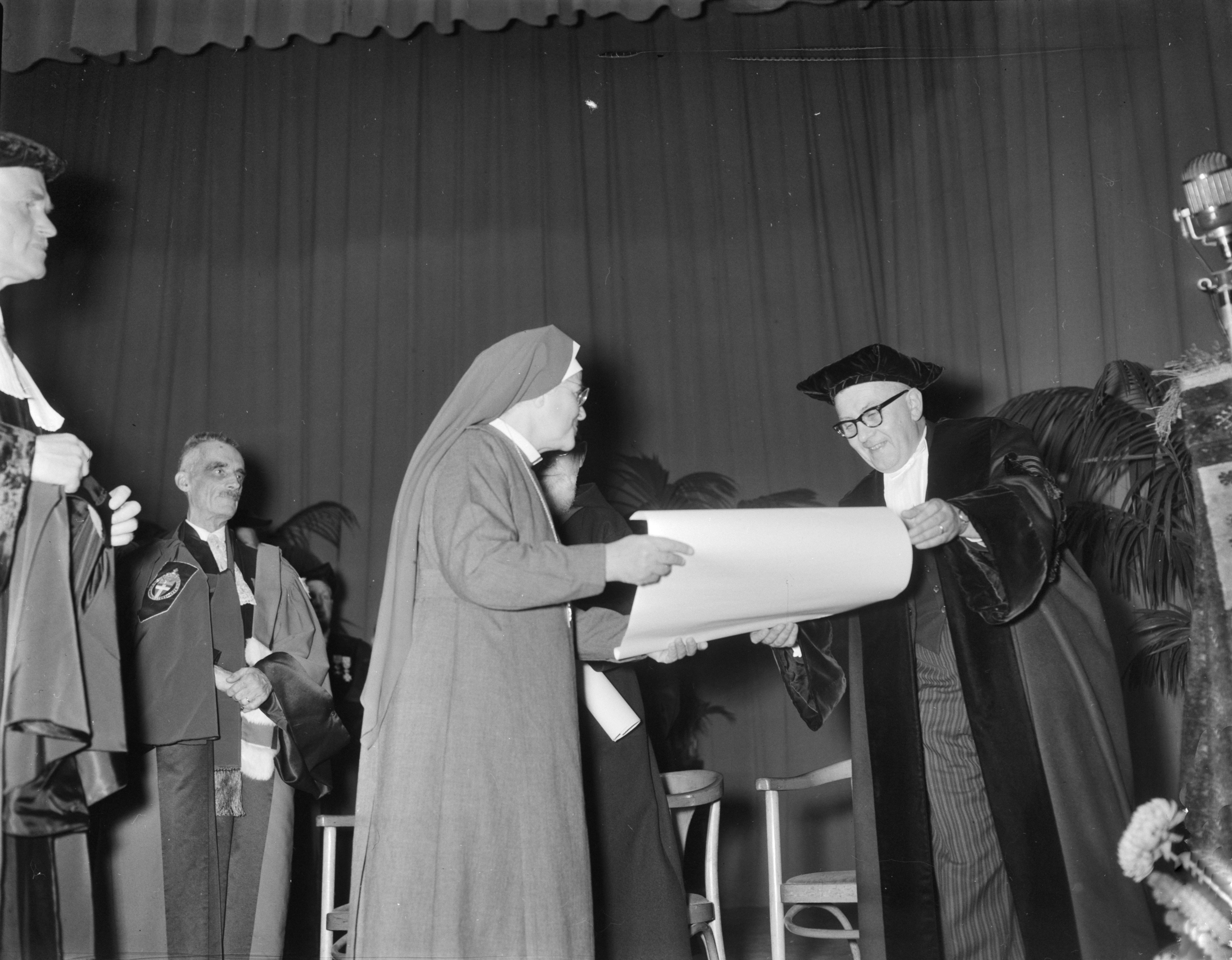
- Dengel receives an honorary doctorate (Nijmegen, 1958)
- Born: 16 March 1892; Steeg, Austria
- Died: 17 April 1980 (aged 88); Rome, Italy
- Education: University College Cork, Ireland
- Known for: Founder of the Medical Mission Sisters
- Parent(s): Edmund Wilhelm Dengel and Maria Gertrud (Scheidle) Dengel

Mother Anna Maria Dengel, Medical Mission Sisters (S.C.M.M.), (16 March 1892 – 17 April 1980) was an Austrian physician, religious sister and missionary. She was the founder of the Medical Mission Sisters, which was among the first congregations of Religious Sisters authorized by the Roman Catholic Church to provide full medical care to the poor and needy in the overseas missions.

== Biography ==
=== Early life and education ===
Anna Maria Dengel was born 16 March 1892, in Steeg, Austria, to Edmund Wilhelm Dengel and Maria Gertrud (Scheidle) Dengel. Anna had four brothers and sisters, and four half-brothers and sisters. After her mother died when Anna was nine, she was enrolled in the boarding school of the Visitation monastery in Hall in Tirol. After completing her schooling there, she was offered a position to teach German in Lyons-la-Forêt, France. Dengel accepted the offer and taught there for two years before returning home to Austria.

=== Career ===
When Anna Dengel was in her mid-20s she heard that a Scottish physician and Catholic missionary, Agnes McLaren, was looking for women doctors for a hospital in Rawalpindi, India (now Pakistan), which had been established to provide medical care for the Muslim women of the region who were barred from care by male physicians. She was overjoyed and immediately wrote to McLaren of her interest, and a lively correspondence between them began. McLaren was already in her mid-70s at this time, however, and died before she and Dengel could meet, but Dengel followed the course of preparation for her mission in India which she and McLaren had set. Dengel took McLaren's advice to attend medical school at University College in Cork, Ireland. In 1919, after graduating, she went to England for a nine-month internship. The following year she left for Rawalpindi to continue the work that McLaren had begun.

For four very difficult years, Dr. Dengel struggled to make an impact on the health care of the women and children in northern India. She became convinced that many more professionally trained and spiritually dedicated women were needed in order to effect real healing among the people. So she set out for the United States to seek help.

=== Foundation of the Medical Mission Sisters ===
Dengel spent months of travel and meetings to make the needs of India known, including discussions with the Reverend Michael A. Mathis, C.S.C., and other Catholic priests, bishops and cardinals, about how best to meet these needs. She encountered the same barrier which her mentor, McLaren, had in her own pioneering service in healthcare to the women and children of Muslim India, namely, the prohibition in Church law barring members of religious institutes from practicing medicine.

After this experience, Dengel came to the conclusion that she needed to establish a new religious congregation dedicated to the cause. She drew up a Constitution for the congregation she had in mind and wrote that the members were "to live for God…to dedicate themselves to the service of the sick for the love of God and …to be properly trained according to the knowledge and standards of the time in order to practice medicine in its full scope, to which the Sisters were to dedicate their lives."

Permission was granted on 12 June 1925 to begin the new congregation, and on 30 September that year the "First Four"—Anna Dengel along with Johanna Lyons, M.D., of Chicago, Evelyn Flieger, R.N., originally from Great Britain, and Marie Ulbrich, R.N., of Luxemburg, Iowa—came together in Washington, D.C., to found the Society of Catholic Medical Missionaries.

The "First Four" were unable to profess canonical vows because the Catholic Church had yet to approve the practice of medicine by Religious Sisters, yet they lived as Sisters just the same. Lifting this restriction had been a goal of Dengel's mentor, Agnes McLaren, who had petitioned the Vatican to have Church authorities do so. Finally, in 1936, after the Medical Mission Sisters had grown, the Catholic Church approved Sisters’ working in medicine and all of its branches and recognized the women as a religious congregation, now known as the Sisters of the Catholic Medical Missions. The members of the Medical Mission Sisters then made their first public vows and Sister Anna Dengel was elected the first Superior General.

=== Death and afterward ===
Mother Anna died in Rome, Italy, on 17 April 1980, and a Mass of the Resurrection was celebrated for her at the Campo Santo in the Vatican City on 21 April. Her body was buried in the Teutonic Cemetery (reserved to natives of Germanic nations serving the Catholic institutions of Rome), which is within the territory of Vatican City.
