= Morris B. Payne =

American politician and architect (1885–1961)

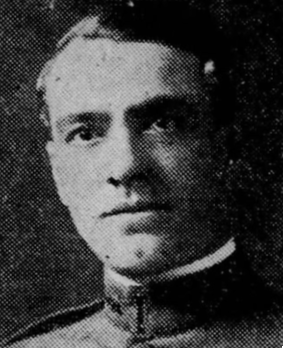

Member of the Connecticut House of Representatives from New London
- In office 1921–1925
- Preceded by: William A. Holt; George Goss
- Succeeded by: Thomas E. Troland; George W. Sisson

Member of the Connecticut Senate from the 18th district
- In office 1939–1941
- Preceded by: William C. Fox
- Succeeded by: Joseph A. St. Germain

Personal details
- Born: Morris Benham Payne; January 19, 1885 Waterford, Connecticut, U.S.
- Died: January 31, 1961 (aged 76) New London, Connecticut, U.S.
- Party: Republican
- Spouse(s): Jane Nash (m. 1909) Mary Payne (m. 1960)
- Children: 1
- Occupation: Architect

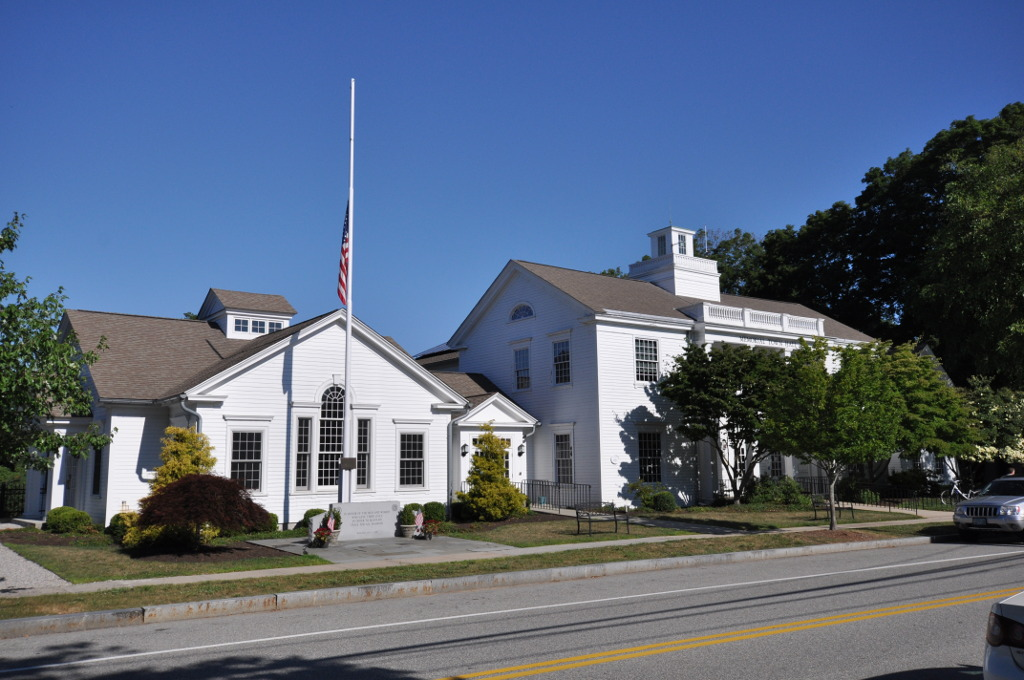
Memorial Town Hall, Old Lyme, 1920.

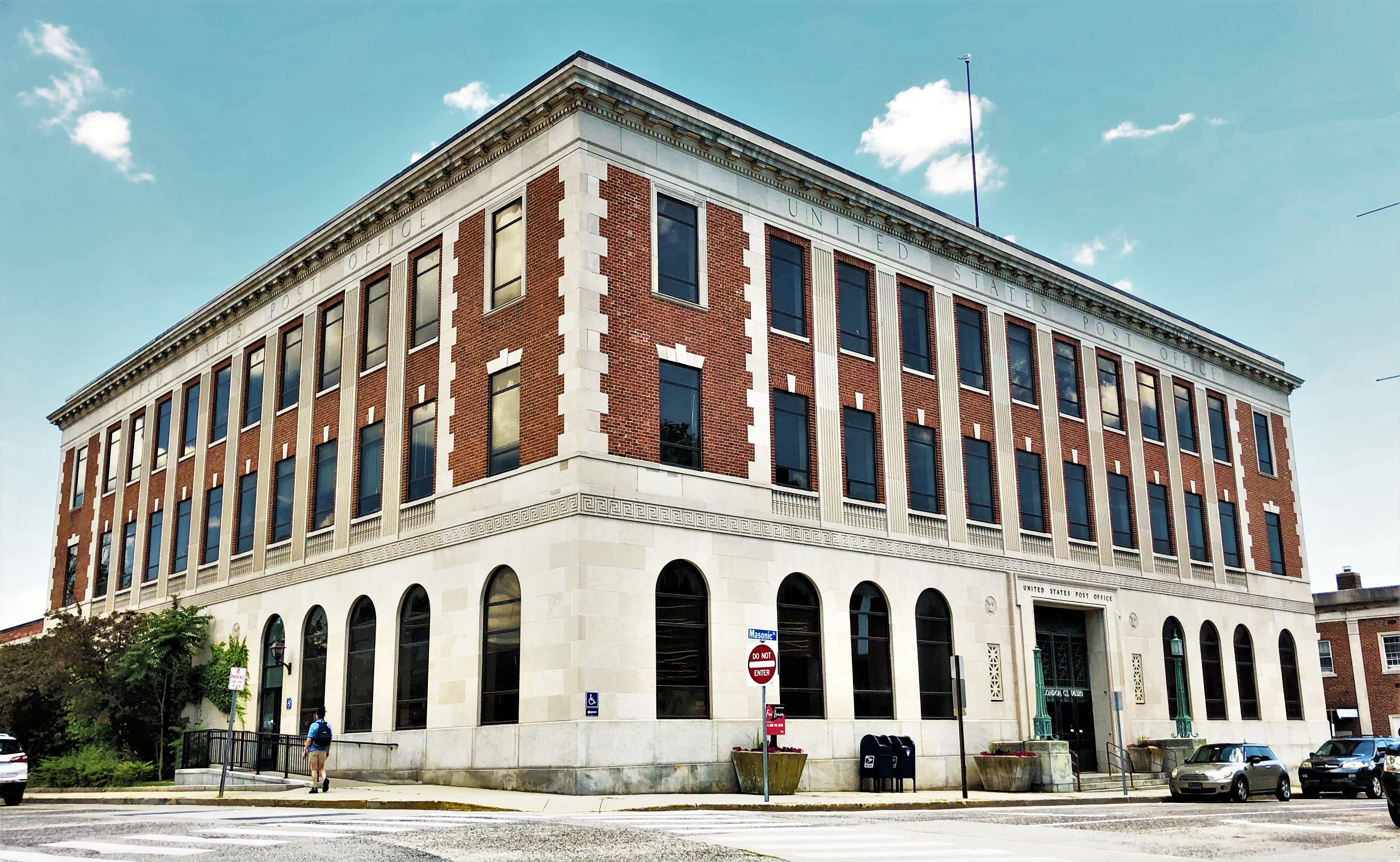
U. S. Post Office, New London, 1932.

Morris Benham Payne (January 19, 1885 – January 31, 1961) was an American politician, architect, and major general in the Connecticut National Guard. From 1921 to 1925, he served in the Connecticut House of Representatives, and from 1939 to 1941, the Connecticut State Senate. He commanded the 43rd Infantry Division at the beginning of World War II.

== Life and career ==
Payne was born in Waterford, Connecticut, on January 19, 1885. He attended the public schools. Wishing to become a civil engineer, he entered the offices of Daball & Crandall, a New London engineering firm. From 1906 to 1912, he was employed by the United States engineering department. When he left government work in 1912, he established a partnership with architect James S. Duffy as Duffy & Payne, architects and engineers. They went separate ways in 1913, and Payne worked alone for the next two years.

In late 1915, he established a partnership with B. Bouis Adams, an architect from Washington, DC. Payne went abroad to France in 1917 with the Coast Artillery Corps, at which point Adams managed the office alone. Due to his declining health in Payne's absence, he closed the office in late 1918, and died in February 1919. Payne returned in January of that year, and after Adams' death, established a new partnership, Payne & Griswold, with Harry Todd Griswold. Edward R. Keefe joined the partnership in 1920, which became Payne, Griswold & Keefe. Griswold withdrew in 1922, after which point the firm existed as Payne & Keefe. Payne & Keefe existed at least through the early 1950s.

=== Military career ===
Payne enlisted in the Connecticut National Guard in 1902 and was commissioned as a second lieutenant in the Coast Artillery Corps in 1906. He was promoted to major in 1912 and was mobilized for service on the Mexican border in 1916. He was remobilized in 1917 and served on active duty during World War I. After the war, he was promoted to colonel in 1922 and brigadier general in 1923 when he was appointed Quartermaster General of the Connecticut National Guard.

On July 18, 1927, he was promoted to major general and placed in command of the 43rd Division. In February 1941, the division was mobilized, and Payne served as its commander until he was relieved of command in October of that year and replaced by Major General John H. Hester. Payne's relief was, apparently, not due to any misconduct on his part but because of War Department policies to place divisions under the most professionally and physically qualified commanders as was possible, regardless of component.

=== Political career ===
A Republican, Payne was elected to the Connecticut House of Representatives in 1920 and served two terms as one of two representatives from the city of New London, leaving office in 1925. He unsuccessfully ran for reelection in 1928.

Payne was elected to the Connecticut State Senate in 1938 and served one term representing the 18th district. He did not run for reelection in 1940 and was succeeded by Democratic candidate Joseph A. St. Germain.

=== Death and burial ===
Payne died on January 31, 1961, at his home in New London, Connecticut. His death was ruled a suicide by firearm. He was buried in Arlington National Cemetery.

He was an active Freemason.

== Legacy ==
One of Payne's buildings, the U. S. Post Office in New London, has been listed on the National Register of Historic Places. In addition, many of his works in New London, Old Lyme, and Groton contribute to listed historic districts.

In a 1921 publication detailing Connecticut domestic architecture, the work of Payne's firm was described as "...in the style so highly esteemed by the Founders. The people here seem to revere the architectural traditions of their old homes, but it appears to be a reverence thoroughly intermixed with discriminatory appreciation which counts for a clientele that stimulates because of its intelligent enthusiasm".

== Architectural works ==
=== Payne & Adams, 1915-1918 ===
- 1915 - Pierre L. Schellens House, 35 Broad St, Groton, Connecticut
- 1916 - Barrows Building, 253 State St, New London, Connecticut
- 1917 - Harry S. Knowlton House, 188 Parkway N, New London, Connecticut

=== Payne & Griswold, 1919-1920 ===
- 1919 - Ansonia State Armory (former), 5 State St, Ansonia, Connecticut
- 1920 - Middletown State Armory (former), 70 Main St, Middletown, Connecticut
  - In association with Orr & del Grella of New Haven. Recently remodeled as a hotel.
- 1920 - Old Lyme Memorial Town Hall, 52 Lyme St, Old Lyme, Connecticut

=== Payne, Griswold & Keefe, 1920-1922 ===
- 1920 - Waterbury State Armory, 64 Field St, Waterbury, Connecticut
- 1921 - Masonic Temple (remodeling), 20 Lyme St, Old Lyme, Connecticut
  - This building served as the Town Hall until the Memorial Town Hall was completed.
- 1922 - Daniel B. Hodgdon House (remodeling), 100 Lyme St, Old Lyme, Connecticut
  - A rebuilding of a 1756 residence.

=== Payne & Keefe, from 1922 ===
- 1922 - Pratt High School (former), 29 West Ave, Essex, Connecticut
  - The Town Hall since 1952.
- 1922 - School, 111 Union St, New London, Connecticut
- 1923 - Dormitory Building, Mystic Oral School for the Deaf, 240 Oral School Rd, Groton, Connecticut
- 1923 - Manchester State Armory (former), 330 Main St, Manchester, Connecticut
- 1927 - Bristol State Armory (former), 61 Center St, Bristol, Connecticut
- 1928 - F. R. Noble Hall, Willimantic State Normal School, Willimantic, Connecticut
- 1928 - Salem Free Public Library (former), 216 Hartford Rd, Salem, Connecticut
- 1930 - New Haven State Armory (former), 290 Goffe St, New Haven, Connecticut
- 1931 - Infirmary, Fitch Home for Soldiers, Noroton Ave, Darien, Connecticut
  - Demolished in 1950.
- 1932 - Fieldhouse, Alfred Mitchell Woods, 701 Montauk Ave, New London, Connecticut
- 1932 - Montville Union Baptist Church, 279 CT-163, Montville, Connecticut
- 1932 - Smith Memorial Home, 7 Vauxhall St, New London, Connecticut
  - In association with George S. Chappell of New York.
- 1932 - U. S. Post Office, 27 Masonic St, New London, Connecticut
- 1933 - Bulkeley High School (additions), 1 Bulkeley Pl, New London, Connecticut
  - The original structure remains, but the later additions have been demolished.
- 1935 - Administration Building, Mystic Oral School for the Deaf, 240 Oral School Rd, Groton, Connecticut
- 1937 - Connecticut National Guard Air Service Building, Brainard Field, Hartford, Connecticut
- 1939 - Buildings, Ocean Beach Park, 98 Neptune Ave, New London, Connecticut
  - Cornelius Flynn, designer.
- 1940 - Oxford Fire Station, 48 Riverview Ave, New London, Connecticut
- 1941 - Housing, Naval Submarine Base New London, Groton, Connecticut
- 1946 - Goshen Fire Station, 63 Goshen Rd, Waterford, Connecticut
- 1950 - Clark Lane School, 105 Clark Ln, Waterford, Connecticut
