= Margaret McKenna =

American Religious Sister and anti-war activist

Margaret McKenna MMS (May 26, 1930 - April 22, 2026) was an American religious sister and anti-militarist activist. Raised in Hackensack, New Jersey, she earned her PhD in the origins and religious thought of Christianity from the University of Pennsylvania. In the 1970s, McKenna began participating in non-violent civil disobedience with the Plowshares Movement, sometimes being arrested or imprisoned for her actions. Her activism has continued through recent years.

In 1989, McKenna helped to found New Jerusalem Laura, a North Philadelphia addiction treatment center that strives to help people recover from substance abuse without the use of medication, by substituting community service, discussion, and Bible study as routes to recovery.

== Early life and education ==
McKenna grew up in Hackensack, New Jersey and upon graduating from high school entered the Medical Mission Sisters, a Catholic Church organization of women dedicated to improving world access to health care. She earned a bachelor's degree in English from Chestnut Hill College, then a small Catholic women's college, and a master's degree in liturgy from Notre Dame University before moving on to the University of Pennsylvania and earning a doctorate in Christian origins and religious thought. For her doctorate thesis, she traveled to Israel for the clarity and solitude.

== Activism ==
me and Sister Margaret on the Pentagon lawn
with our wrists in a plastic tie

— "Timothy Hay" by mewithoutYou

McKenna has been arrested for several acts of civil disobedience since becoming an activist in the 1970s. In 1987, she participated in a protest over the Iran–Contra affair during the bicentennial celebration of the signing of the constitution in Philadelphia. In 1988 on Easter Sunday, McKenna and three other Plowshares activists accessed the third deck of the USS Iowa and symbolically hammered on empty Tomahawk missile housings before pouring their own blood on them. At the same time, a banner that read "Follow the nonviolent Christ" was placed on the side of the ship. The group was charged with trespassing, and McKenna was sentenced to four months in prison. In 2007, McKenna, as well as musician Aaron Weiss, was arrested for participating in a "die-in" to protest the civilian casualties of the Iraq War on the grounds of The Pentagon in Arlington County, Virginia. This event was referenced in the song "Timothy Hay" by Weiss's band, mewithoutYou, on their album It's All Crazy! It's All False! It's All a Dream! It's Alright.

== New Jerusalem Laura ==
McKenna and Richard Withers, a modern-day hermit, both of whom were passionate about Desert Fathers at the time, asked themselves, "Where is the desert today?" After concluding that "the desert" was the inner cities, in 1989, they moved to the Fox Chase neighborhood in Northeast Philadelphia. There, they witnessed the impact of drug addiction on the lives of the residents. In reaction, McKenna and Withers founded New Jerusalem Laura in an attempt to treat drug and alcohol addiction. In addition to New Jerusalem, McKenna helped set up the Peacemakers Reflection Center and the Alternate to Violence Project in her community.

New Jerusalem Laura's addict counseling methods were influenced by those of One Day at a Time, founded by the Rev. Henry Wells. For the first 60 days of their stay, recovering addicts are prohibited from contacting the outside world, must surrender their cigarettes, and must be escorted if they leave the building. During this time, residents occupy their time with chores, community service, meetings, and Bible studies. After the first 60 days, residents' actions are less tightly restricted; however, they are still required to participate in the chores, Bible studies, and meetings. Residents graduate from the program after six months.

McKenna believes that the reason for the New Jerusalem Laura's success is the community. "In a recovery community, you can't get away with [lying], because it shows," she said. "It forces you to be honest." Nearly 400 residents have graduated from the program since its inception. Of those, close to seventy percent are reported to remain drug-free, well above the results of traditional recovery methods.
