= Medical Mission Sisters =

Catholic female missionary organization

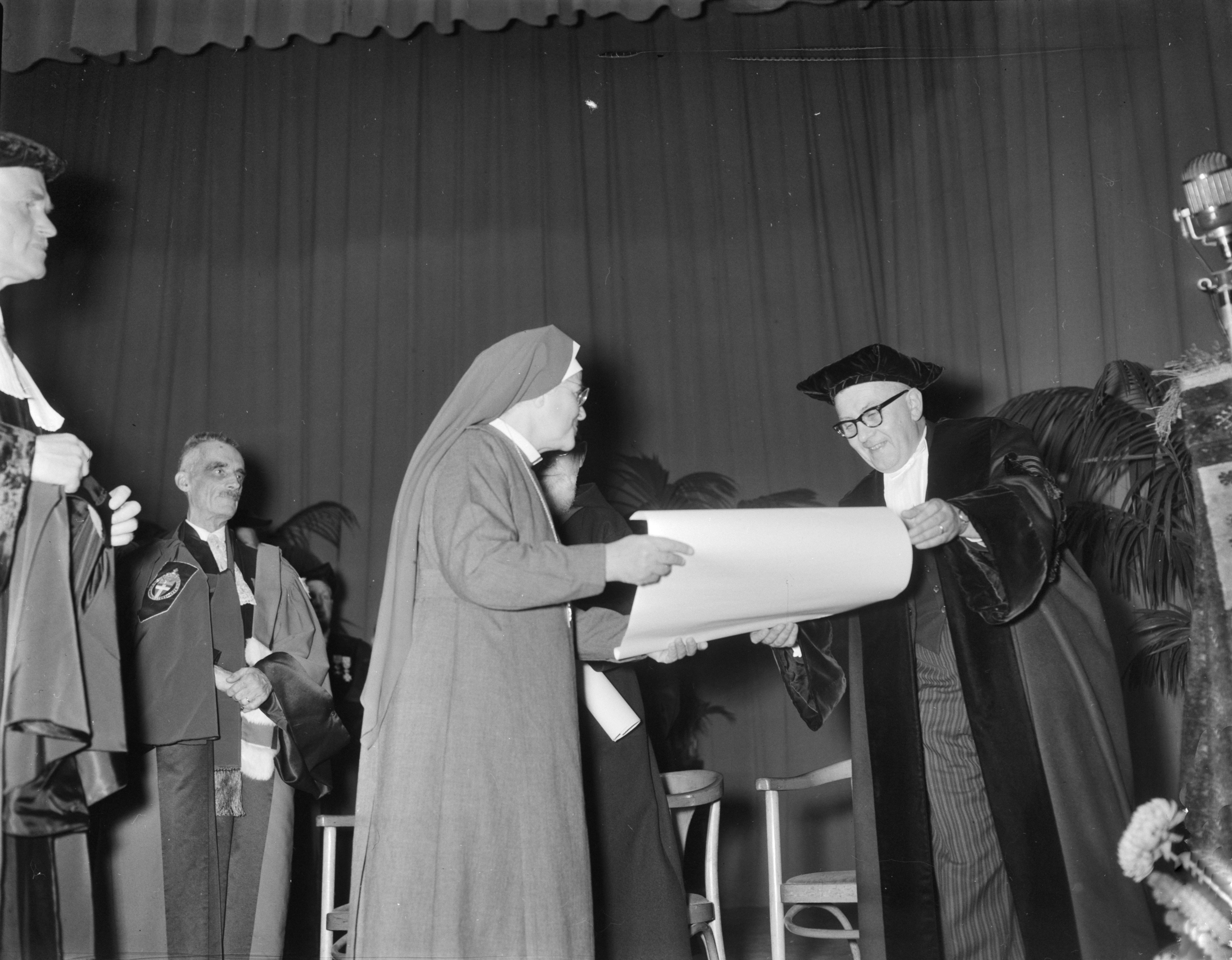
Dengel receives an honorary doctorate (Nijmegen, 1958)

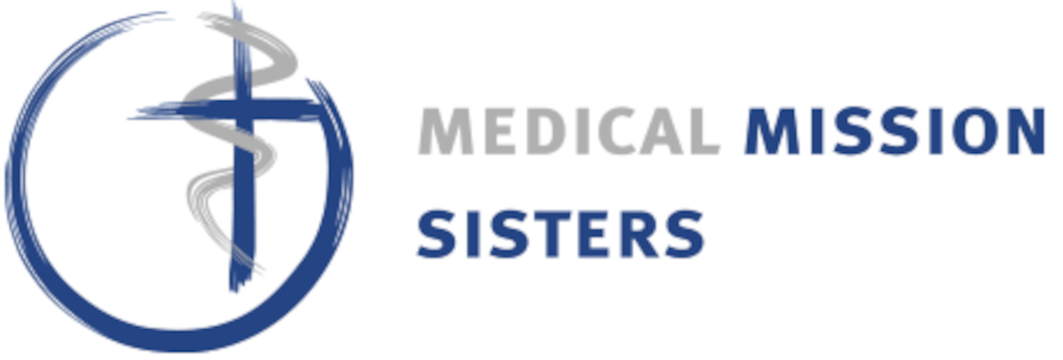
English Logo of the Medical Mission Sisters

The Medical Mission Sisters (MMS) is a religious congregation of women in the Roman Catholic Church. It was founded in September 1925 with a goal of providing better access to health care to poor people around the world. They were formerly known as the "Society of the Catholic Medical Missions."

== History ==
The MMS congregation grew out of the experiences of Dr. Anna Dengel, who is originally from Austria. Dengel served as a medical missionary for several years in what was then Northern India (modern-day Pakistan). Dengel became convinced that only a group of Religious Sisters who had been professionally trained as physicians could reach the women in that region. Such a project, however, was contrary to the canon law of the time, since it prohibited members of religious institutes from practicing medicine.

Dengel made plans for a new community and drew up a constitution for it. She wrote that the members were “to live for God...to dedicate themselves to the service of the sick for the love of God and...to be properly trained according to the knowledge and standards of the time in order to practice medicine in its full scope, to which the Sisters were to dedicate their lives”.

Permission was granted on June 12, 1925, to begin the new congregation and, on September 30, 1925, the “First Four” - Dr. Anna Dengel of Austria, Dr. Johanna Lyons of Chicago, Evelyn Flieger, R.N., originally from Britain, and Marie Ulbrich, R.N., of Luxemburg, Iowa - came together in Washington, D.C. to begin the Medical Mission Sisters.

The “First Four” were unable to profess religious vows officially because the Catholic Church had yet to approve Sisters working in the medical field, but they chose to live as professed Sisters. In 1935, the Catholic Church changed its regulations and approved Sisters’ working in medicine and all of its branches. The MMS then made their public, canonical vows, and began to establish communities around the world.

== Governance ==
The North American headquarters for the Congregation was established in Philadelphia, Pennsylvania in 1964.

The General Chapter meets every six years to re-interpret the Society's mission. It will also elect the Society Co-Ordinator (Superior General) and the Society Leadership Team.

== Music ==
In 1964 the Sisters followed the example of The Singing Nun (Soeur Sourire) and began singing their own homegrown brand of spiritually-themed folk music as an aide to the medical health and wellness they professed.

The following year one of the most prolific of these composers, Sister Miriam Therese Winter composed Joy is Like the Rain, which became a Grammy-award-winning worldwide hit. Response was so strong to the song that other songs were written and a marathon eight-hour recording session with the original group of sisters was commissioned in Philadelphia in early 1966 that resulted in enough material to fill a number of albums, with the bulk being released on Joy is Like the Rain, I Know the Secret and Knock Knock. Subsequent to the original recording, the original group was scattered to the four winds and seven seas. Other tracks from those sessions appeared interspersed with newer recordings on subsequent albums featuring a rotating cast of singers.

== Beginnings of international hospitals ==
In 1965, at the request of the Roman Catholic Archdiocese of Addis Ababa in Ethiopia, Mother Anna made a visit to that nation to investigate the possibilities of starting a hospital for the people there. Two Medical Mission Sisters came to Ethiopia in 1967 to start the groundwork for this mission. A few more Sisters arrived in 1969, and Attat Hospital was opened that year. In 2022, the medical director, Sister Rita Schiffer, received the Else Kröner-Fresenius Foundation Award.

== Current status ==
As of 2023, there are about 450 Sisters in the congregation, serving in 20 nations, as well as over 100 lay Associates.

The Sisters serve through health care and education, wholeness and wellness programs, the development of women, work for justice, worship and spirituality, and music and song. Along with their Associates, they have committed themselves to live the mission of the Society, which is "to be a healing presence at the heart of a wounded world.". Their work includes:

- In India, the Sisters run the Center for Healing and Integration, to train the people low to get low-cost health care through natural resources.
- In Pasco County, Florida, they run a community-based program to connect the unemployed with potential employers.
- In Udenhout, the Netherlands, a Learning Center for Ecological Spirituality has been established.
- In Philadelphia Sr. Margaret McKenna runs a drug recover center.
- In Germany, Medical Mission Sisters have worked as course instructors at the Holy Cross – Centre for Christian Meditation and Spirituality in the Holy Cross Church in Frankfurt-Bornheim since its inception.

== See also ==
- Christine Schenk
- Anna Dengel
- Monika Hellwig
- Eileen Niedfield
- Miriam Therese Winter
