= Submarine warfare =

Naval warfare conducted by submarines

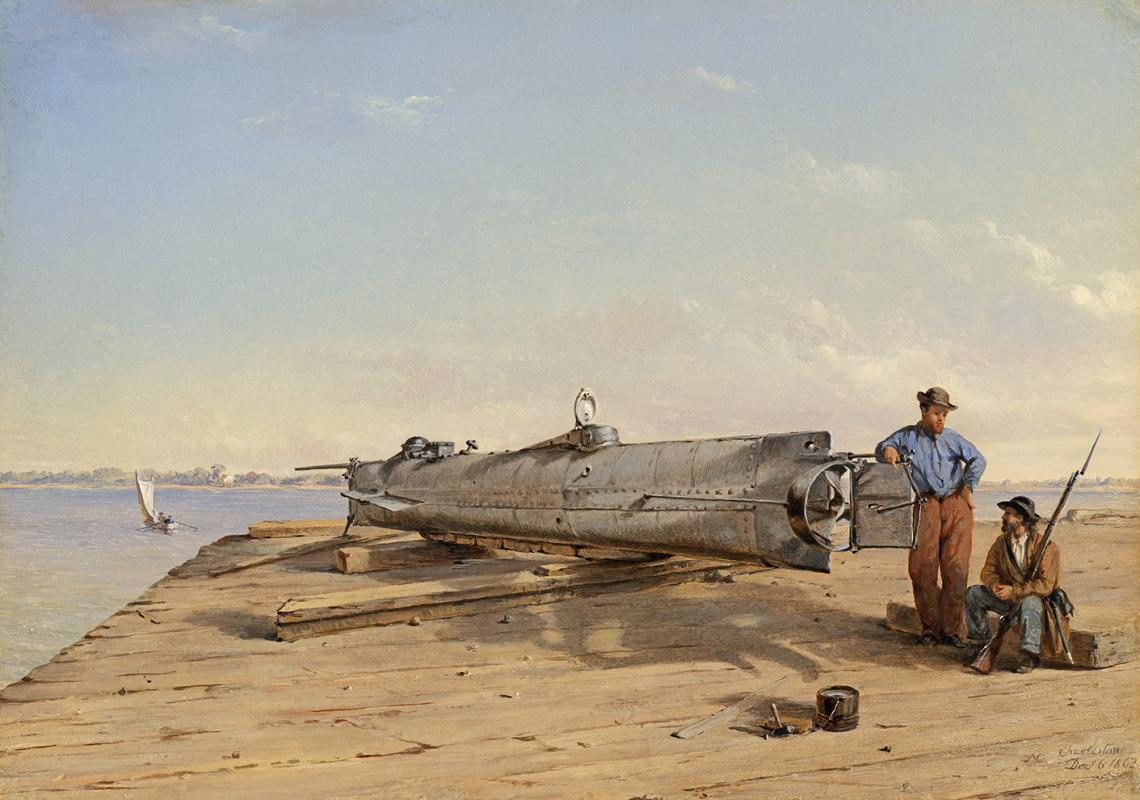
H.L. Hunley, the first submarine to sink an enemy vessel in combat.

Submarine warfare is one of the four divisions of underwater warfare, the others being anti-submarine warfare, mine warfare and mine countermeasures.

Submarine warfare consists primarily of diesel and nuclear submarines using torpedoes, missiles or nuclear weapons, as well as advanced sensing equipment, to attack other submarines, ships, or land targets. Submarines may also be used for reconnaissance and landing of special forces as well as deterrence. In some navies they may be used for task force screening. The effectiveness of submarine warfare partly depends on the anti-submarine warfare carried out in response.

== American Revolutionary War ==
The first attack by a submarine allegedly occurred on September 8, 1776, by the American submersible Turtle in an unsuccessful attack on the British ship of the line HMS Eagle.

== American Civil War ==
The development of submarine warfare accelerated during the American Civil War, as both the Union and the Confederacy experimented with submersible vessels for naval combat. Although attempts to develop military submarines predated the conflict, including David Bushnell's Turtle during the American Revolutionary War, the Civil War saw the first successful use of a submarine to sink an enemy warship.

The Confederate submarine H. L. Hunley, privately financed and constructed in 1863, was developed as a weapon against Union naval forces enforcing the blockade of Southern ports. The vessel was manually propelled by a crew of eight and designed to attack enemy ships using an explosive charge. On 17 February 1864, Hunley attacked the Union sloop-of-war USS Housatonic off the entrance to Charleston Harbor, South Carolina, detonating a spar-mounted torpedo against the ship's hull. Housatonic sank, making it the first enemy warship successfully sunk by a submarine in combat. Five members of the Union vessel's crew were killed in the attack. However, Hunley also sank shortly afterward, with the loss of all eight members of her crew.

The Confederate and Union experiments with submersible vessels during the war helped establish the submarine as a potential naval weapon. The experience gained from these early developments influenced subsequent American submarine designers and contributed to the eventual development of operational submarines in the late nineteenth century.

== World War I ==
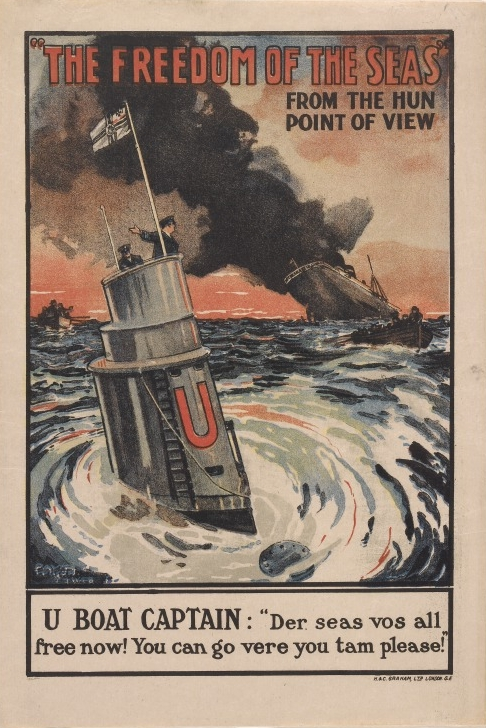
British WWI propaganda poster

Submarine warfare in World War I was primarily a fight between German and Austro-Hungarian U-boats and merchant vessels bound for the United Kingdom, France, and Russia. British and Allied submarines conducted widespread operations in the Baltic, North, Mediterranean and Black Seas along with the Atlantic Ocean. Only a few actions occurred outside the wider European-Atlantic theatre.

The first round of major German submarine attacks on Allied merchant ships began in February 1915, but American civilian deaths, especially with the sinking of Lusitania, turned American public opinion against the Central Powers. The U.S. demanded it stop, and Germany conducted submarine attacks under prize rules from September 1915 to January 1917. Admiral Henning von Holtzendorff (1853–1919), chief of the admiralty staff, argued successfully in December 1916 to resume unrestricted attacks from February 1917 and thus starve the British. The German high command realized the resumption of unrestricted submarine warfare, now to include deliberate attacks on neutral shipping, meant war with the United States but calculated that American mobilization would be too slow to stop a German victory on the Western Front and played a large role in the United States entering the war in April 1917. Once naval convoys were implemented, sinkings did not reach the German Imperial Admiralty Staff's optimistic projections.

The sinking of HMS Pathfinder was the first combat victory of a modern submarine, and the exploits of SM U-9, which sank three British cruisers in under an hour, established the submarine as an important new component of naval warfare. During World War I more than 5,000 Allied ships were sunk by U-boats.

German submarines were used to lay naval mines and to attack iron ore shipping in the Baltic. The British submarine flotilla in the Baltic operated in support of the Russians until the Treaty of Brest-Litovsk. During the war, the British invested efforts into developing a submarine that could operate in conjunction with a battleship fleet – the "Fleet Submarine". To achieve the necessary 20 knots (37 km/h) (surfaced) the K-class submarines were steam powered. In practice, the K class were a constant problem and could not operate effectively with a fleet.

== Interwar period ==
Between the wars, navies experimented with submarine cruisers (France, Surcouf), submarines armed with battleship caliber guns (UK, HMS M1) and submarines capable of carrying small aircraft for reconnaissance (HMS M2 and Surcouf).

Germany was denied submarines by the terms of the Treaty of Versailles, but built some anyway. This was not legitimized until the Anglo-German Naval Agreement of 1935, under which the UK accepted German parity in submarine numbers with the Royal Navy.

== World War II ==
In World War II, submarine warfare was split into two main areas – the Atlantic and the Pacific. The Mediterranean Sea was also a very active area for submarine operations. This was particularly true for the British and French, as well as the Germans. The Italians were also involved, but achieved their greatest successes using midget submarines and human torpedoes. Dutch submarines sank a total of fifty enemy ships during the war, which together totaled 200.000 tons.

=== Atlantic Ocean ===
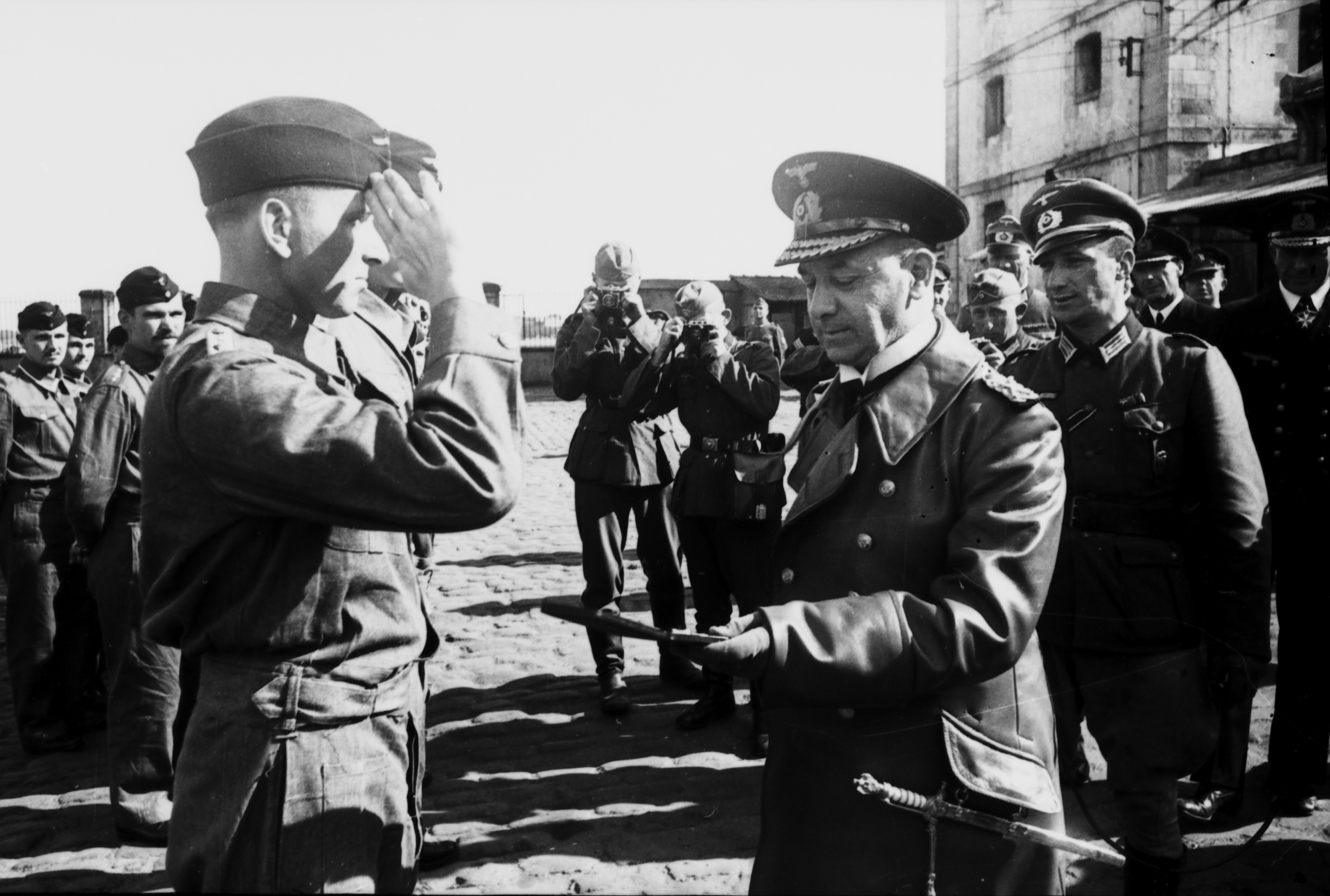
Grand Admiral Erich Raeder with Otto Kretschmer (left), a German U-boat commander, August 1940

In the Atlantic, German U-boats targeted allied convoys as they had in the First World War. Many British submarines were active as well, particularly in the Mediterranean and off Norway, against Axis warships, submarines and merchant shipping.

Initially, Hitler ordered his submarines to abide by the prize rules, but this restriction was withdrawn in December 1939. Although mass attacks by submarine had been carried out in World War I, the "wolf pack" was mainly a tactic of World War II U-boats. The main steps in this tactic were as follows:

- A number of U-boats were dispersed across possible paths of a convoy.
- A boat sighting a convoy would signal its course, speed and composition to German Naval Command.
- The submarine would continue to shadow the convoy, reporting any changes of course.
- The rest of the pack would then head to the first boat's position.
- When the pack was formed, a coordinated attack would be made on the surface at night.
- At dawn, the pack would withdraw, leaving a shadower, and resume the attack at dusk.

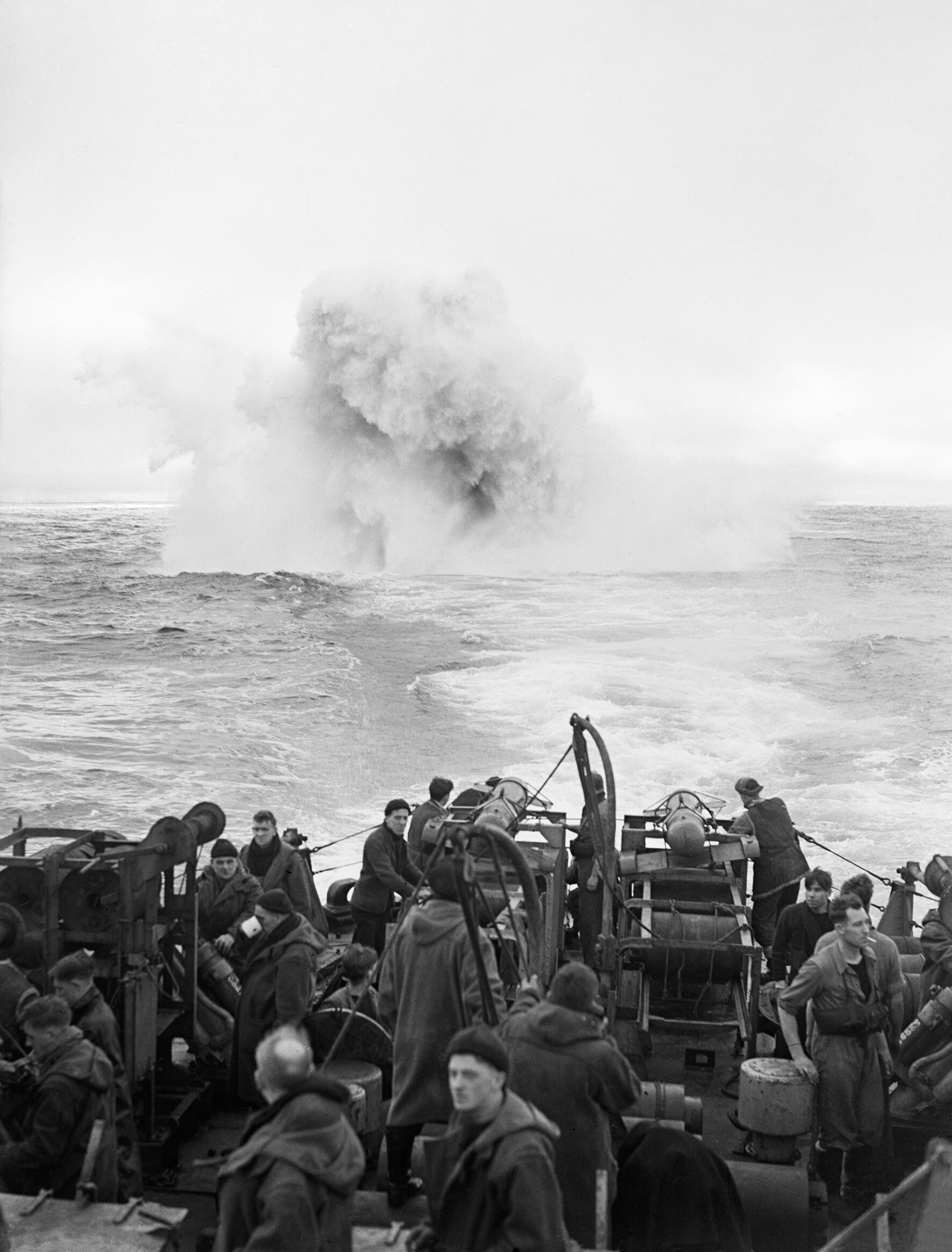
Depth charges detonate astern of the sloop HMS Starling. She participated in the sinking of 14 U-boats throughout the war

With the later increase in warship and aircraft escorts, U-boat losses became unacceptable. Many boats were lost, and the earlier experienced commanders with them.

Almost 3,000 Allied ships (175 warships, 2,825 merchantmen) had been sunk by U-boats. Germany's U-boat fleet suffered heavy casualties, losing 793 U-boats and about 28,000 submariners out of 41,000, a casualty rate of about 70%.

=== Pacific Ocean ===
In the Pacific, the situation was reversed, with US submarines hunting Japanese shipping. By war's end, US submarines had destroyed over half of all Japanese merchant ships, totaling well over five million tons of shipping. British and Dutch submarines also took part in attacks on Japanese shipping, mostly in coastal waters. Japanese submarines were initially successful, destroying two US fleet aircraft carriers, a cruiser, and several other ships. However, following a doctrine that concentrated on attacking warships, rather than more-vulnerable merchantmen, the smaller Japanese fleet proved ineffectual in the long term, while suffering heavy losses to Allied anti-submarine measures. Italian submarines and one German submarine operated in the Pacific Ocean, but never enough to be an important factor, inhibited by distance and difficult relations with their Japanese ally.

=== Other areas ===
==== Indian Ocean ====
Japanese submarines operated in the Indian Ocean, forcing the British surface fleet to withdraw to the east coast of Africa. Some German and Italian submarines operated in the Indian Ocean, but never enough to play a significant role.

== Post-World War II ==
Since the Second World War, several wars, such as the Korean War, Indo-Pakistani War of 1971, the Falklands War and the 2026 Iran War have involved limited use of submarines. Later submarine-launched land-attack missiles were employed against Iraq and Afghanistan. With these exceptions, submarine warfare ceased after 1945. Hence strategic thinking about the role of submarines has developed independently of actual experience.

The advent of the nuclear-powered submarine in the 1950s brought about a major change in strategic thinking about submarine warfare. These boats could operate faster, deeper and had much longer endurance. Their larger sizes also allowed them to become missile launching platforms. Nuclear power would allow submarines to have greater accuracy and the ability to use torpedoes against ships, other submarines, and land targets. In response to this the attack submarine became more important, particularly in regard to its postulated role as a hunter-killer. The US also used nuclear submarines as radar pickets for a while. There have also been major advances in sensors and weapons.

During the Cold War, the United States and the Soviet Union played what was described as a 'cat-and-mouse' game of detecting and even trailing enemy submarines.

As the likelihood of unrestricted submarine warfare has diminished, thinking about conventional submarines has focused on their use against surface warships. The mere existence of a submarine may curtail surface warships' freedom to operate. To counter the threat of these submarines, hunter submarines were developed in turn. The role of the submarine has extended with the use of submarine-launched autonomous unmanned vehicles. The development of new air independent propulsion methods has meant that the diesel-electric submarine's need to surface, making it vulnerable, has been reduced. Nuclear submarines, although far larger, could generate their own air and water for an extended duration, meaning their need to surface was limited in any case.

In today's more fractured geopolitical system, many nations are building and/or upgrading their submarines. The Japan Maritime Self-Defense Force has launched new models of submarines every few years; South Korea has upgraded the already capable Type 209(Chang Bogo class) design from Germany and sold copies to Indonesia. Russia has improved the old Soviet Kilo model into what strategic analysts are calling equivalent to the 1980s-era Los Angeles class, and so on.

At the end of his naval warfare book The Price of Admiralty, military historian John Keegan postulates that eventually, almost all roles of surface warships will be taken over by submarines, as they will be the only naval units capable of evading the increasing intelligence capabilities (space satellites, airplanes etc.) that a fight between evenly matched modern states could bring to bear on them.

However, thinking about importance of the submarine has shifted to an even more strategic role, with the advent of the nuclear ballistic missile submarine carrying Submarine-launched ballistic missiles with nuclear weapons to provide second strike capability.

A 2024 study found that climate change may decrease the detectability of submarines in certain locations.

In March 2026, during Operation Epic Fury, the United States sank an Iranian frigate near Sri Lanka with a MK 48 torpedo.

== See also ==
- Unrestricted submarine warfare
- Antisubmarine warfare
