= Isaac Doolittle =

Watchmaker and inventor 1721–1800

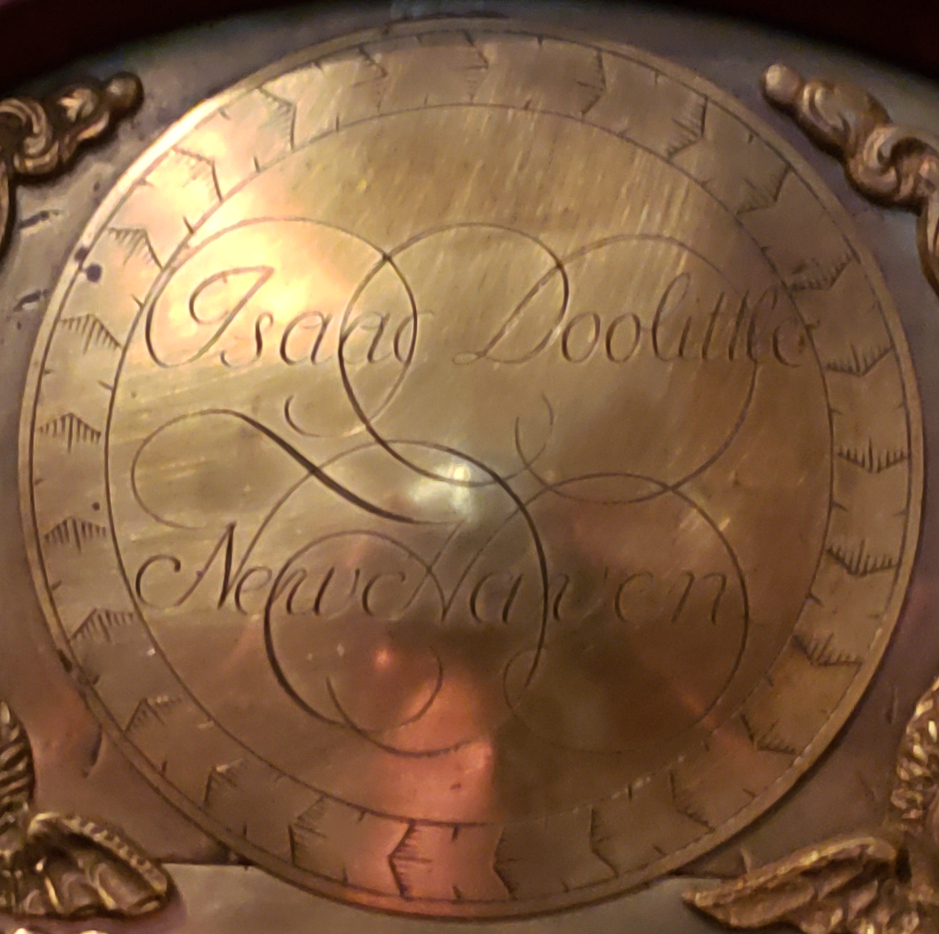
- Signature medallion from brass clock face of an Isaac Doolittle hall clock, c. 1770
- Born: August 3, 1721; Wallingford, Connecticut Colony, British America
- Died: February 13, 1800 (aged 78); New Haven, Connecticut, United States
- Occupation: Engineer
- Spouse: Sarah Todd
- Children: 9
- Parent(s): Joseph and Sarah Doolittle

Isaac Doolittle (August 3, 1721 – February 13, 1800) was an early American clockmaker, inventor, engineer, manufacturer, militia officer, entrepreneur, printer, politician, and brass, iron, and silver artisan. Doolittle was a watchmaker and clockmaker, known for making and selling at his shop in New Haven, Connecticut, one of the first brass wheel hall clocks in America, where he also crafted and sold scientific instruments, and is regarded as "the first native practitioner" of silversmithing in the Connecticut Colony. He was also an engraver and printer of both legal forms and currency, and became the first American to design, manufacture, and sell a printing press in 1769. Somewhat late in life, he became a successful self-educated bell-foundryman, learning the difficult craft of casting large metal bells.

Doolittle was an important figure in the religious life of Connecticut as an Episcopal Churchwarden and co-founder of Trinity Church on the Green in New Haven. Called a "good Whig" by Yale President Ezra Stiles, he was an active Patriot during the American Revolution. Perhaps his most notable contribution is his having designed and crafted in 1775 the moving and brass parts for David Bushnell's submersible vessel Turtle, the first submarine used in combat. In making the watch work triggering mechanism for Bushnell's explosive underwater magazine, Doolittle created the first mechanical time bomb, while his two-blade propeller was the first practical and applied use of a propeller in watercraft.

Doolittle was well known in his time as an "ingenious mechanic", or what would be called an engineer today. His many pioneering innovations are associated with the popular notion of Yankee ingenuity, for which he has been called "The First Yankee".

== Early life ==
Isaac Doolittle was born in Wallingford, Connecticut, the son of Joseph and Elizabeth (Holt) Doolittle. At an early age he apprenticed under the clockmaker Macock Ward in Wallingford, but moved to New Haven about the time he married Sarah Todd of Wallingford on November 10, 1743. He opened a shop across from Yale College on Chapel Street, where he repaired, made, and sold not only clocks and watches, but "compasses, sea and land surveyors scales and protractors, gauging rods, walking sticks, silver plated buttons turned upon a horn, and a variety of other work".

=== First Warden of Trinity Church ===
After opening his clock, instrument, and silversmith shop in New Haven, Doolittle became quite wealthy. Around 1749, he was appointed along with Enos Alling by the Anglican missionary priest and educator the Reverend Samuel Johnson, D.D., as one of two church wardens of Trinity Church on the Green, the first Church of England parish in Puritan-dominated New Haven, where the Congregationalist Church was the established state religion of the colony and Yale College in the town was seen as "The School of the Prophets" and the bastion of Puritan orthodoxy. Against strong and determined Puritan opposition, in 1752, he and fellow warden Alling obtained a deed for a plot from innkeeper Samuel Mix, Jr., and oversaw the construction of the first Trinity Church in 1752–1753, with Doolittle contributing more money to its construction than any of its other founding members. He continued on in the role of warden, guiding the parish for much of the next 35 years, from 1750 to 1765, from 1770 to 1777, and again from 1783 to 1785.

=== French and Indian War ===
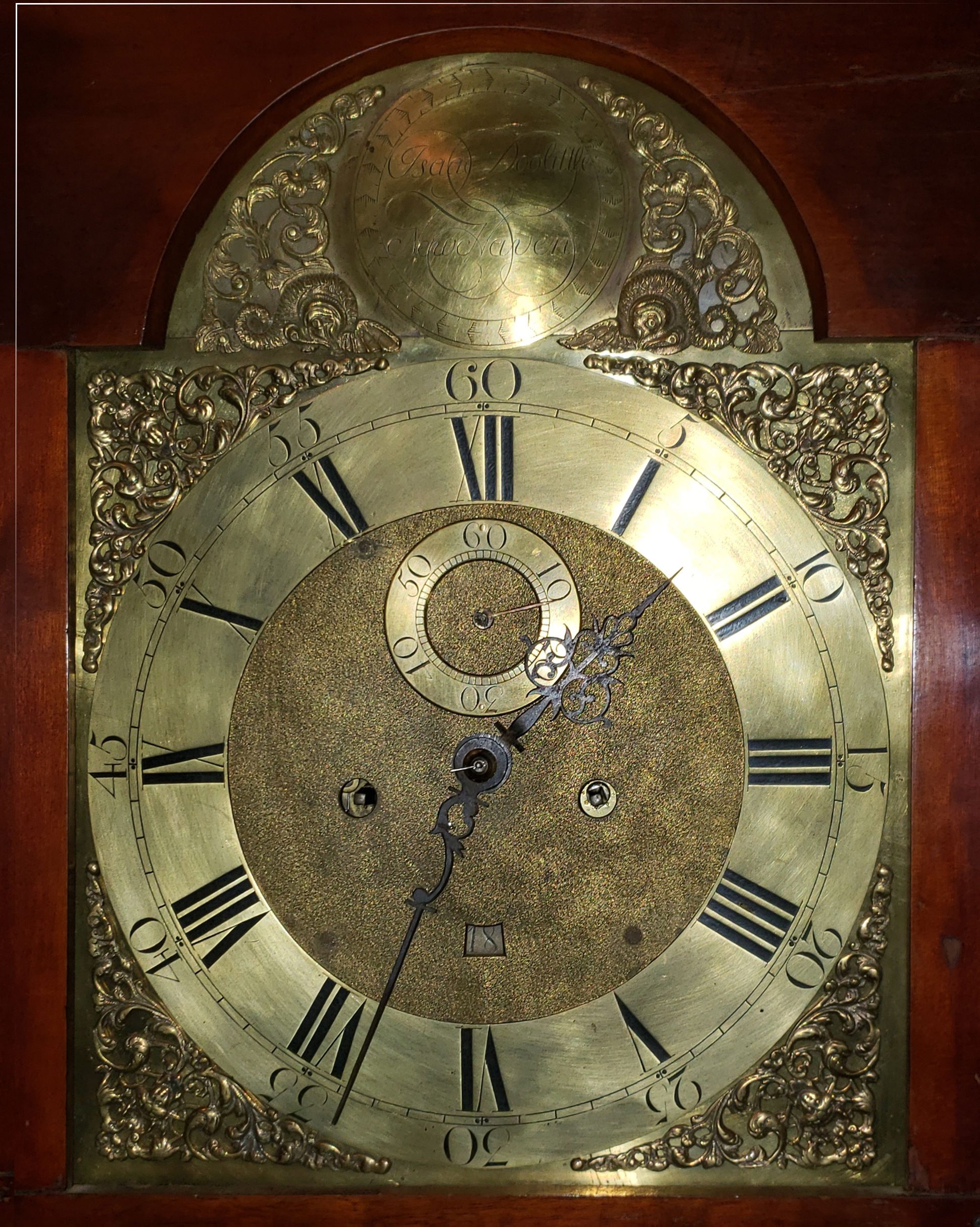
Isaac Doolittle brass hall clock face, c. 1770s

At the height of the French and Indian War the General Court of Connecticut appointed Doolittle Armourer (or Armorer) of the Connecticut Militia: in 1755, he served on the General Staff under General William Johnson from June 9 to August 6 and from September 10 to December 6, supporting Connecticut's war effort. He was again appointed Armorer in 1758, this time for Connecticut's Fourth Regiment under Colonel David Wooster. As armorer "he gained some experience in gunpowder production", which would prove vitally important to the Patriot war effort during the American Revolutionary War twenty years later. He designed an innovative nested bateau or lake boat for the 1755 amphibious attack on Fort Carillion and saw the construction of the Land Tortoise, a floating gunboat, skills he would use two decades later in the American Revolution. He also gained firsthand knowledge of British leadership incompetence in the disastrous expedition against Fort Carillon as well as their superior naval capabilities in the successful Siege of Louisbourg of 1758.

While he was armorer in the summers of 1755 and 1758, he was billeted with the provincial militia and British officers at the manor house of Fort Crailo. There he met the British Army surgeon Dr. Richard Shuckburgh, who composed the song Yankee Doodle while at the manor house in June of 1758. As the contemporary meaning of "doodle" was "a cant word, perhaps corrupted from do little" meaning "idler", and Doolittle was from the then rural and culturally backward town of Wallingford, it has been suggested in a 2020 paper that Isaac Doolittle was the ironic inspiration for the comic song.

Video of Isaac Doolittle hall clock striking the hour

=== Pre-Revolution business activities ===
By 1760, he had returned wholly to civilian endeavors. He was selling imported silver watches, and advertising his own manufactured clocks, bar iron, "screws for clothiers" and surveyor's instruments and mariner's compasses in his Chapel Street shop. As the British Parliament's Iron Act 1750 prohibited iron and steel manufacturing, Doolittle was already exhibiting a resistance to the British he had so recently joined to fight the French.

In 1764, he was appointed tax collector in New Haven for "Proprietors of the Township of Ludlow, in the Province of New Hampshire. He was also a sealer of weights and measures for town of New Haven, and printed Connecticut currency in his shop as well as government forms.

In 1769, after successfully duplicating the iron screw used in printing presses, he expanded his business to manufacture and sell the first printing press made in America, which he sold to William Goddard of Philadelphia. The Massachusetts Gazette and Boston Weekly News-Letter of September 7, 1768 described it as a "Mahogany Printing-Press on the most approved construction, which by some good judges in the Printing Way, is allowed to be the neatest ever made in America and equal, if not superior to any imported from Great-Britain". He and his son Isaac Jr. produced about a dozen presses over the next 20 years, each taking 5 weeks to build and priced at 16 pounds sterling, half the price of a press imported from England.

In August 1774, Doolittle advertised in the New Haven newspapers that he had erected a bell-foundry, and was selling bells made to order. It was said that the town always treated the casting of a bell as a great event, and many came to “watch the furnace being tapped and the metal flaming into the molds.” His move from small metal casting to large may have been motivated by the need for arms in the coming war: given his experience as a field armorer, it was a small step from molding bells to molding cannons. He would continue to cast bells almost until his death in 1800.

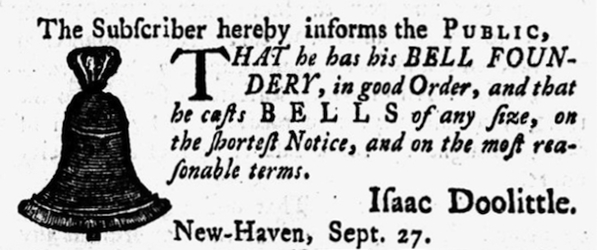
Advertisement for Isaac Doolittle's bell foundry in New Haven Connecticut Journal, September 29, 1784

== American Revolutionary War ==
Doolittle was a member of the New Haven Committee of Correspondence. When the war started in 1774, Doolittle, with his partners Jeremiah Atwater and Elijah Thompson, erected a gun powder mill in the nearby village of Westville, three miles north-west of New Haven, which turned out large quantities of gunpowder during the war to supply the patriot army and militias. He was also a paymaster for the militia.

He was a New Haven selectman and served on a committee to procure guns for the town's defense. In 1775, he was appointed a commissioner in charge of erecting a beacon to be used to give an alarm if the British attacked New Haven, and was in charge of New Haven's port ship inspections to ensure the boycott of British imports was followed. He was also appointed that year to a Connecticut government committee to prospect for lead mines in the colony. In 1776, he was a member of the New Haven Committee of Safety, where he organized a September 17, 1776, memorial warning against the activities of notorious Loyalists such as his fellow churchwarden Abiathar Camp, who five years later in 1781 indeed procured pilots and boats to guide the British fleet into New London harbor.

There is a tradition that Doolittle, though "the most important man among its founders", was forced out of the position Warden at Trinity Church, then part of the Church of England, "because he had aided the king's enemies by making powder" and that it was not until "the conclusion of peace Mr. Doolittle was reinstated in the hearts of his countrymen and in the vestry he became one of the wardens". However, only two of the 100 heads of households of the church Doolittle helped found were Loyalists. A large number of its members were Patriot privateers or soldiers, and even the neutralists members of his church turned Patriot after the destructive British General Tryon's raid on New Haven. Its rector the Rev. Dr. Bela Hubbard even substituted General George Washington's name for King George III in its prayer services. It was more likely that Doolittle's many war-time activities left him too busy to fulfill the warden's duties until after the war.

=== The Turtle ===
The Turtle submarine, built in New Haven in 1775 under the authority and funding of the Connecticut government, was the first submarine to engage in warfare. According to Benjamin Gale, a respected doctor in the town of Clinton, Connecticut, and an inventor himself, the many brass and mechanical (moving) parts of were built by Doolittle. Though Yale student David Bushnell is often given the overall design credit for the idea of the Turtle by Gale and others, Doolittle is often credited if at all as only a hired "mechanic". However, the relationship was actually asymmetric in the other direction. In 1775, Bushnell was a poor 35 year old Yale bachelor student and a former farmer in rural Connecticut who had sold his half-share of his Westbrook, Connecticut, farm to his brother to fund his education as a medical doctor. Doolittle was a very wealthy and highly respected 55 year old head of a family of seven, a successful shop owner with a thriving business, the long time Warden and founder of Trinity Church in New Haven, and a pillar of the city, where he was a city and state armorer, tax collector, selectman, port inspector, lead prospector, and gunpowder miller with access to government funding. He was experienced in large metal design and manufacturing of iron screws and brass bells, as well as the more delicate design and construction of pumps, navigation instruments, and clockwork devices. He owned with his own foundry and had team of apprentices at hand, many of whom were underemployed as "the demand for clocks was extremely limited" darning the war. He had access to gunpowder and lead, the two most scarce materials needed for the submarine. In the context of the time, an "ingenious mechanic" in Gale's wording was what today would be called an engineer and inventor, a designer and not just a craftsman.

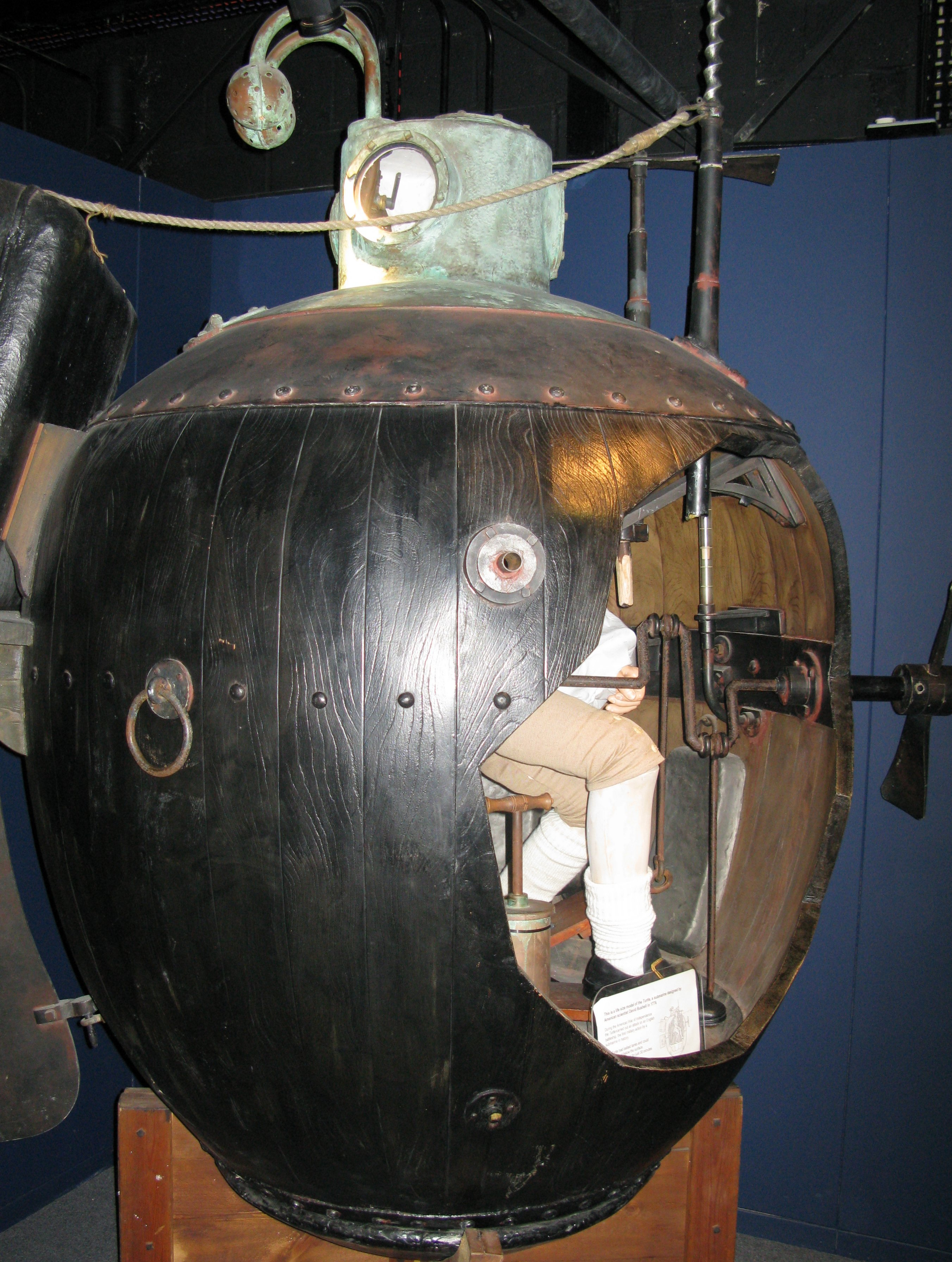
The Turtle submarine

"Much of the equipment Bushnell needed to produce for his submarine was beyond the skills of a blacksmith" and were "sophisticated designs requiring precision manufacturing"; they required artisans with years of skill as apprentices, and the ability "to visualize mechanical concepts and interactions between gears and levers" as well as the tools and machinery to make the parts. Given his mechanical engineering expertise and previous experience in design and manufacturing brass bells, clocks, screws, and marine instruments, it seems likely Doolittle designed the brass and the moving parts of the Turtle. Given his wealth and public position, he also likely funded the Turtle's development, supplied the scarce commodities of gunpowder and lead, and obtained the colonial government's cooperation for the first tests. Of the four major innovations of the first submarine, Bushnell figured out how ignite gunpowder underwater while he was a student at Yale, while brass caster, watchmaker, and scientific instrument maker Doolittle designed the propeller and its drive systems, the first working underwater depth gauge, and the mine attachment and clockwork timed detonator. Doolittle's propeller, described as a "a pair of oars fixed like the two opposite arms of a windmill", had "no precedent" in design and was the first known use of a bladed propeller in a watercraft. His clockwork detonator attached to the underwater mine was the first known mechanically detonated time bomb. Other parts of the Turtle, its hand crank, the food-driven treadle, and the flywheel for propulsion, brass and iron emergency ballast drop, brass forcing or bilge pumps for water ballast, brass circular hinged hatch with three round glass ventilation doors, two brass snorkel pipes and ventilator bellows, compass marked with bio-luminescent foxfire, and the rudder along with its iron bar steering mechanisms were based on preexisting designs and were likely jointly designed by Bushnell, Doolittle and his team, then built by Doolittle in his shop and brass factory.

Recently, Doolittle's involvement in the Turtle was part of an important ruling in the field of copyright law over the ownership rights of the "original analysis" identifying Doolittle as the engineer of the brass hatch for the Turtle submarine. On July 15, 2015, US District Judge Jeffrey Alker Meyer ruled in the lawsuit of Leary v. Manstan, in the District of Connecticut that copyright law for nonfiction works does not cover "original historical theories nor use of typical storytelling techniques so long as they do not appropriate the particular expression used by another author."

== Marriage and children ==
Isaac Doolittle married Sarah Todd on November 10, 1743. Sarah Todd Doolittle was born on January 30, 1725, in New Haven, and died on March 10, 1814, in New Haven. Together they had nine children, five of whom died before Isaac's death in 1800 and a sixth before Sarah's:

Thankful Doolittle (b. January 21, 1745, bapt. January 27, d. May 17, 1751, in Wallingford, aged 6);

Sarah Doolittle (b. June 29, 1747, bapt. July 16 in Stafford, d. July 21, 1832, in New Haven, aged 85);

Abigail Doolittle (b. October 3, 1749, bapt. November 1749, d. October 24, 1794, in New Haven, aged 45);

Mary Doolittle (b. March 12, 1752, bapt. April 8, d. August 6, 1760, in New Haven, aged 8); (Note: Mary Doolittle was buried on the New Haven Green. Her grave stone was removed from the Green and moved (probably in 1821) to Grove Street Cemetery, New Haven, where it was placed along the West Wall.)

Thankful Doolittle (b. January 21, 1754, d. February 16, 1827, in New Haven, aged 73);

John Todd Doolittle (b. May 20, 1756, d. 1773 in New Haven, aged 17);

Isaac Doolittle Jr. (b. February 13, 1759, d. September 15, 1821, in Cheshire, aged 62); (Note: Isaac Doolittle Jr. took over his father's shop after the elder Isaac's death in 1800 and continued to repair and make clocks and scientific instruments. He is buried in Grove Street Cemetery, New Haven.)

William Frederick Doolittle (b. April 14, 1761, death date unknown, suggesting infant mortality); and

Elizabeth Mary Doolittle (b. March 16, 1765, d. April 5, 1811, in Guilford, aged 46).

== Final days ==
Doolittle's health failed in 1785 and he suspended business activity for several years, but in January 1788 he announced in a newspaper advertisement his return to health and business in his reopened shop. There is a humorous anecdote by the well-known New Haven physician Eneas Munson, a man known not only as a scientific doctor but for his droll comments at the expense even of his intimate friends, that may illuminate something of Doolittle's irascible character in this period. According to the account of Henry Bronson:

He gave an emetic to a troublesome neighbor, Isaac Doolittle, who in a fit of intoxication had taken an ounce of laudanum. The next day, finding his patient sober, he admonished him in the most solemn manner of the error of his ways, saying he had rescued him from a horrible death. “I do not thank you for what you have done,” Doolittle replied. “Well, I am sure the neighbors won't,” responded the doctor.

Doolittle continued to make clocks and cast bells until 1797, when his health failed again and he largely retired from business. He died on February 13, 1800, at age 78, according to his obituary, "after a long and distressing illness of several years", honored as "a very worthy and respectable character". He was buried on the Green in New Haven near the State House; there is an empty space apparently reserved for his stone at Grove Street Cemetery next to his co-warden Enos Alling, but his stone was either lost, broken, or not transferred when the other stones from people buried on the Green were moved to Grove Street Cemetery in 1821 – though his daughter Mary's stone can be found along the west wall there. His wife Sarah, born on January 30, 1725, in New Haven, Connecticut, died on March 10, 1814, in New Haven and is buried in Center Street Cemetery, Wallingford, Connecticut.

== Legacy ==
The brass works for a number of Doolittle's clocks survive in private hands, and a circa 1765 "tall clock" is part of the holding of the Metropolitan Museum of Art in New York City. A number of Doolittle's many apprentices continued his work, including his son Isaac Doolittle Jr. (who took over his father's clockmaking shop following the elder Isaac's death), his nephew Enos Doolittle, Hezekiah Hotchkiss, Nathan Howell, Simon Jocelin, his younger cousin Amos Doolittle, and James Cochran, who took over Doolittle's bell-foundry. It has been noted that, "The talent of these local artisans and others ensured New Haven's reputation as a leading hardware and clock-manufacturing city by the middle of the nineteenth century". Doolittle's grandson, Isaac Doolittle III, was also a Patriot in the War of 1812, an inventor who patented devices for steam engines and furnaces, and, like his grandfather, a pioneering printer and artist who illustrated the poem "Old Santeclaus with Much Delight" in an 1821 book that was the first publication to illustrate the modern American legend of Santa Claus. In this and in other illustrated books he is sometimes credited with introducing the United States to lithography.

The Turtle was the first submersible vessel used for combat. Historian of technology Brooke Hindle credited the Turtle as "the greatest of the wartime inventions." Thus it has inspired a number of working and artistic replicas, some of which can be found on display at the Royal Navy Submarine Museum in Gosport, United Kingdom, the Connecticut River Museum in Essex, the Submarine Force Library and Museum in Groton, and the Oceanographic Museum in Monaco. Rick Brown, a co-builder of a 2002 replica, called it "the greatest technological advancement of the American Revolutionary War," and that with it, "Yankee ingenuity was born".

In addition to inspiring the song Yankee Doodle, Isaac Doolittle also inspired the New Haven area playwright General David Humphreys in 1814 to present a comic rustic "Yankee Character" named Doolittle on stage. He published it along with a glossary of peculiar Yankee’s expressions and pronunciations that was mined for decades by other playwrights. This Yankee Character dominated American Theater, appearing in over 100 plays from 1825 to 1850; it created a set of works considered by American theater historian Francis Hodge “as an actor’s theatre—as an American commedia dell’ arte.” At the same time, Isaac Doolittle’s cousin Amos Doolittle engraved and printed the now famous cartoon Brother Jonathan Administering a Salutary Cordial to John Bull (1813), launching the Brother Jonathan stock Yankee figure into popular culture. This somewhat darker and less pleasant version of the Yankee Character also appeared in novels with characters named Doolittle, including Washington Irvine's Rip Van Winkle and The Legend of Sleepy Hollow (1820), and James Fenimore Cooper’s The Pioneers (1823). The comic yet warlike cultural icon that progressed from Yankee Doodle, to the Yankee Character, to Brother Jonathan, to Uncle Sam in the nineteenth century, remained popular in American "hillbilly" media, cartoons, and stage productions in the twentieth century.

For over half a century, from 1743 until his retirement in 1797, Doolittle was "one of the leading manufacturers and most versatile mechanics" in the American colonies and "a citizen of character and enterprise, whose mark in his generation was that of striking originality", as well as a key historical transition figure in the shift from Puritan to Yankee in New England. Doolittle, "The First Yankee", is often cited as an early example of the famous Yankee ingenuity stereotype of inventiveness, discovering technical solutions to practical problems, self-reliance, and individual enterprise.

== See also ==
- Early American publishers and printers
