= Duke Riley (artist) =

American artist

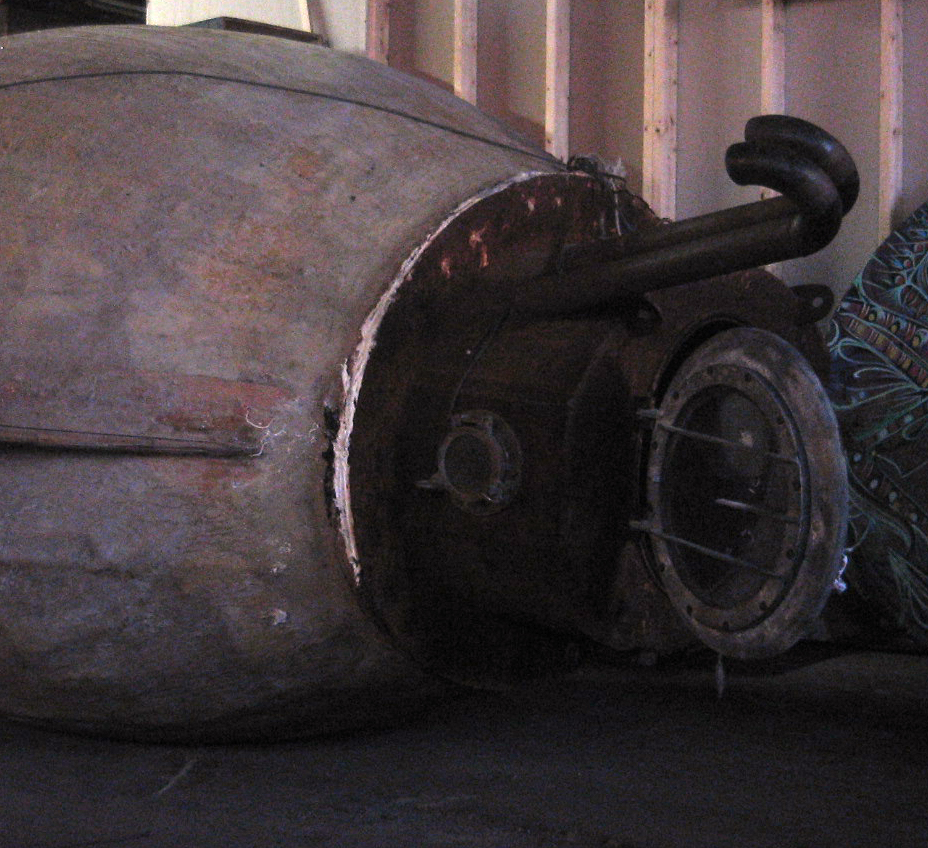
The Acorn a replica of the Revolutionary War Turtle

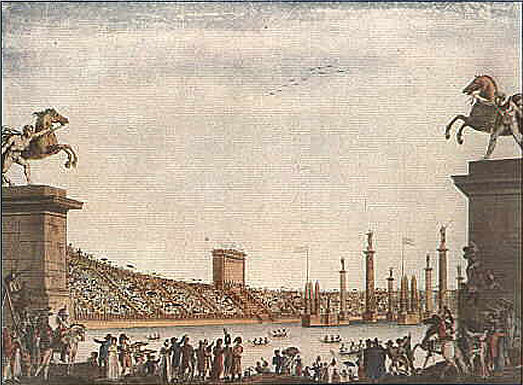
A naumachia held in the Civic Arena of Milan in 1807

Duke Riley is an American artist. Riley earned a BFA in painting from the Rhode Island School of Design, and a MFA in Sculpture from the Pratt Institute. He lives in Brooklyn, New York. He is noted for a body of work incorporating the seafarer's craft with nautical history, as well as the host of a series of illegal clambakes on the Brooklyn waterfront for the New York artistic community. Riley told the Village Voice that he has "always been interested in the space where water meets land in the urban landscape." He is represented by Praise Shadows Art Gallery in Boston, Massachusetts.

== Works ==
One of Riley's projects entailed a bar constructed from found objects in the concrete pilings that supported the humming Belt Parkway. Riley told a reporter for The New York Times that he charged for the drinks so that he was violating New York law by selling alcohol without a license as well as trespassing on federal property.

In 2007, Riley launched a replica of the Revolutionary War era Turtle, a small wooden submarine designed to enable American patriots to sink British Navy ships by attaching mines to the hulls. He and two companions who had helped him construct the wooden submarine were arrested by the New York City police when they came within 200 feet of the Queen Mary 2, without authorization, at New York City's Red Hook Brooklyn cruise ship terminal. Jesse Bushnell, one of the men arrested with Riley, is a descendant of David Bushnell, the inventor of the Turtle.

In 2009 he constructed four ships for the purpose of staging a Naumachia, a Roman-style gladiatorial sea battle staged for an audience. Riley's Naumachia, entitled, Those About to Die Salute You, was staged at the Queens Museum of Art in a reflecting pool left over from the 1964 World's Fair that was filled with 70,000 gallons of water for the occasion. Since the weapons were baguette and tomatoes, and the audience as well as the warriors dressed in period costume, Artnet described the event as something between a Toga party and fraternity food fight. Riley constructed ships from four different historical periods, including a model of his nemesis, the Queen Mary 2. The ships were crewed by staff from four New York City Museums, the Queens Museum of Art, the Brooklyn Museum, the Bronx Museum of the Arts and El Museo del Barrio of Manhattan. Although the ships sank rapidly, Riley told The New York Times that he considered the work of art a success since no one was killed, drowned, injured or arrested.

In 2016, Fly by Night, a performance in the Brooklyn night sky by 2,000 Riley-trained, LED light-carrying pigeons enjoyed tremendous critical and popular success; The New York Times called it "a revelation."

His 2017 exhibit, Now Those Days Are Gone, featured drawings and samplers depicting individual birds, mostly pigeons, as well as including a bicycle, army truck, and MASH supplies.

The bicycle from Now Those Days Are Gone.

MASH Supplies (detail) in Now Those Days Are Gone

Detail of truck dashboard of Now Those Days Are Gone with its "Teach Thomas Paine" bumper sticker.

In 2018, Riley's work Fly by Night was featured as part of the London International Festival of Theatre (LIFT) 2018. A temporary artwork was installed at the end of the Ridgeway, in South East London, on land previously used as the driving range for the Thamesview Golf centre on the Thames Path.

In the Summer of 2022, the Boston Public Library acquired Riley’s The Enchafed Flood (2020-21). According to a New York Times article on the artist, this large-scale mosaic was partly inspired by the Great Molasses Flood of 1919, which destroyed several neighborhoods in the North End, Boston. It is one of the only contemporary artworks that the library has purchased for permanent installation.

== Solo exhibitions ==
- 2024: "The Repatriation of King Skellig Mör", Praise Shadows Art Gallery, Boston, MA
- 2022: "DEATH TO THE LIVING, Long Live Trash", Brooklyn Museum, Brooklyn, NY
- 2021: "Lovers, Muggers, and Thieves", Praise Shadows Art Gallery, Boston, MA
- 2017: "Now Those Days Are Gone", Magnan Metz Gallery, New York, NY
- 2013: "Trading With The Enemy", Magnan Metz Gallery, New York, NY
- 2012: "The Rematch", Zhujiajiao, Shanghai
- 2011: "Two Riparian Tales of Undoing", Magnan Metz Gallery, New York, NY
- 2010: "An Invitation of Lubberland", Museum of Contemporary Art Cleveland, Ohio; "Reclaiming the Lost Kingdom of Laird", as part of "Philagrafika 2010", Historical Society of Pennsylvania; "Second St. Patrick's Day Parade", Havana, Cuba
- 2009: "Those About to Die Salute You", Queens Museum of Art, NY; "First St. Patrick's Day Parade", Havana, Cuba
- 2007: "After the Battle of Brooklyn: East River Incognita 2", Magnan Projects, New York, NY
- 2006: "Duke Riley Presents Paul Pierce for Chanel", "Six Feet Under Series", White Box, New York, NY
- 2005: "United Islands of the East River: East River Incognita", Sarah Lawrence College, NY
- 2001: "Duke Riley", Climate 8, New York, NY

== Group exhibitions ==
- 2023: "Like Two Sealed Copies of Expansions," Tempus Projects, Tampa, FL
- 2022: "Punchline", Jane Lombard Gallery, New York, NY
- 2013: "Battle Ground," Proteus Gowanus, Brooklyn, NY
- 2012: "To The Stars On The Wings Of An Eel", Gowanus Ballroom, Brooklyn, NY
- 2011: "Sea Worthy", Elizabeth Foundation for the Arts, New York, NY; "Bienal do Mercosul", Port Alegre, Brazil
- 2010: "Announcing Magnan Metz Gallery", Magnan Metz Gallery, New York, NY
- 2009: "Bright Path", Little Berlin, Philadelphia, PA; "Seaworthy", Corridor Gallery, Brooklyn, NY; "Rent Control: NYC Documented and Imagined", The Maysles Institute, Harlem, NY; "Chelsea Visits Havana: Havana Biennial", Museo Nacional de Bellas Artes de La Habana, Havana, Cuba
- 2008: "Maritime: Ships Pirates & Disasters", Contemporary Art Galleries, Storrs, CT; "Building Steam", Grossman Gallery, Lafayette College, Easton, PA; "Plastic Topography, South Street Seaport Museum", Melville Gallery, New York, NY
- 2007: "Grow Your Own", Palais de Tokyo, Paris, France; "Emergency Room", MoMA PS1, Queens, NY; "Mixed Signals", Ronald Feldman Fine Arts, New York, NY
- 2006: "Ultimate Destination" D.U.M.B.O. Arts Center Gallery, Brooklyn, NY
- 2005: "Building", British Consulate, Belfast, Northern Ireland; "A Knock At The Door", Lower Manhattan Cultural Council, New York, NY; "We Could Have Invited Everyone", Andrew Krepps Gallery, New York, NY; "Inaugural Opening", Magnan Projects, New York, NY
- 2004: "Benefit Show", Robert Miller Gallery, New York, NY; "T&A IV", GV/AS Gallery, Brooklyn, NY; "Book", Weir Space, Belfast, Northern Ireland
- 2002: "Invitational Group Show", National Arts Show, New York, NY
- 2001: "Night Swimming", State of Art Gallery, Brooklyn, NY
- 2000: "Of Earth and Sky", American Museum of National History, New York, NY
- 1999: "Three-Person Exhibition", C. Francis Gallery, Providence, RI
- 1996: "Invitational Group Show", Bernard Toale Gallery, Boston, MA

== Awards, Grants, and Scholarships ==
- 2013: The Percent for Art Commission, PS 343 Manhattan, NY
- 2012: Creative Time Global Residency, Africa; Gasworks International Residency Programme, London
- 2011: Pollock-Krasner Foundation, New York, NY; smARTpower, U.S. State Department, Shanghai, China; Residency, The Wassaic Project, Wassaic, NY; Joan Mitchell Foundation Grant, Painters an Sculptors, New York, NY
- 2010: MTA Arts for Transit ArtCard, New York, NY; AICA Award, 2nd Place Best Project in a Public Space: "Duke Riley: Those About to Die Salute You"
- 2009: Art Matters Foundation, New York, NY
- 2008: MTA Arts for Transit Commission: Beach 98th Street Station Renovation, 2011 Completion; Chashama Residency, Fremantle Arts Center, Fremantle, Western Australia
- 2007: Residency, Fremantle Arts Center, Fremantle, Western Australia
- 2005: Graduate Academic Achievement Scholarship, Pratt Institute, Brooklyn, NY; Circumnavigate, Independent Project Grant, Artists Space, New York, NY
- 2004: Lagenside Development Corporation Grant, Cathedral Arts Quarter, Annual Festival, Belfast, Northern Ireland
- 2003: Belfast Arts and Business Partners Foundation Grant, Northern Ireland
