= Ezra Lee =

Colonial American soldier – commander of the Turtle (1749–1821)

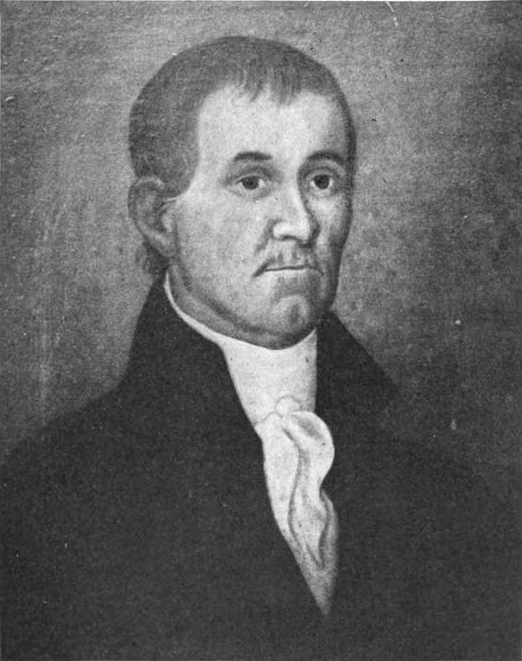
Sgt Ezra Lee

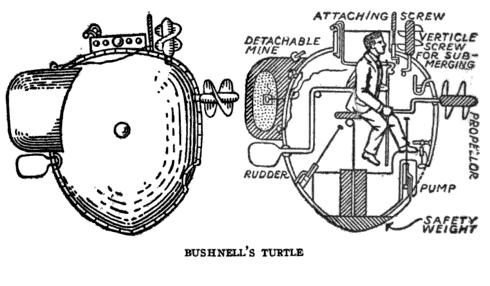
A diagram of the American Turtle It incorrectly depicts the propeller as a screw blade; reported by Sergeant Lee, it was a paddle propeller blade.

Ezra Lee (August 1749 – October 29, 1821) was an American colonial soldier, best known for commanding and operating the one-man Turtle submarine.

== Early life and career ==
Lee was born in Lyme, Connecticut. On January 1, 1776, he enlisted in the 10th Continental Regiment, which was raised in Connecticut, as a sergeant.

In August 1776 he was selected by brother-in-law Brigadier General Samuel Holden Parsons, also of Lyme, as one of several volunteers to learn to operate the Turtle, an early submarine invented by Saybrook, Connecticut, native David Bushnell. When General George Washington authorized an attack on British Admiral Richard Howe's flagship HMS Eagle, then lying in New York harbor, Lee was chosen to operate the "infernal machine".

== Governors Island attack ==
Sergeant Lee piloted the Turtle up to the Eagle, which was moored off what is today called Governors Island, due south of Manhattan. A common misconception was that Lee failed because he could not manage to bore through the copper-sheeted hull. In practice, it has been shown that the thin copper would not have presented any problem to the drill, and that he likely struck a metal rudder support.

A more likely scenario is that Lee's unfamiliarity with the vessel made him unable to keep the Turtle stable enough to work the drill against the Eagle's hull. When he attempted another spot in the hull, he was unable to stay beneath the ship, and eventually abandoned the attempt. Governors Island is off the southern vertex of Manhattan, this is the place where the Hudson River and the East River merge. The currents at this point would be strong and complex. The Turtle would only be able to attack a ship moored here during the short period of time when the incoming tide balanced the river currents. It is possible that during the attack the tide turned and Lee was unable to compensate. He released the keg of gunpowder when British in row boats attempted to pursue him. The British, suspecting some trick, gave up their pursuit.

Lee landed safely after remaining several hours in the water, and received the congratulations of Washington, who afterwards employed him on secret service. Lee made an attempt a short time afterward with Turtle to destroy a British frigate that lay opposite the village of Bloomingdale, but was discovered and compelled to abandon the enterprise. The submarine was soon afterward sunk by the British as it sat on its tender vessel, in Fort Lee, New Jersey. Years later in a letter to Thomas Jefferson, Bushnell reported he had salvaged the Turtle; its final fate is unknown.

After these events, Lee was congratulated by Washington and General Israel Putnam and moved into the secret service/special forces. Lee's headstone says "He was a Revolutionary Officer, and esteemed by Washington."

== Later action ==
Lee was commissioned as an ensign in the Continental Army on October 11, 1776. Following a reorganization of the army, Lee was transferred to the 1st Connecticut Regiment on January 1, 1777, was promoted to 2nd lieutenant on January 1, 1778, and to 1st lieutenant on June 5, 1778. He was appointed as regimental quartermaster on November 16, 1778, and transferred to the 5th Connecticut on January 1, 1781. He was appointed as paymaster in June 1781.

During the Revolution, Lee participated in the battles of Trenton, Brandywine, and Monmouth. He had his sword handle shot off and received many bullet holes in his coat at Brandywine. He was discharged from the army in June 1782.

Lee is buried in the Duck River Cemetery in modern-day Old Lyme, Connecticut. His 1821 obituary mentioned that, "This soldier is the only man who fought the enemy upon land, upon water, and under the water,"
