= Turtle (submersible) =

First submersible vessel used in combat

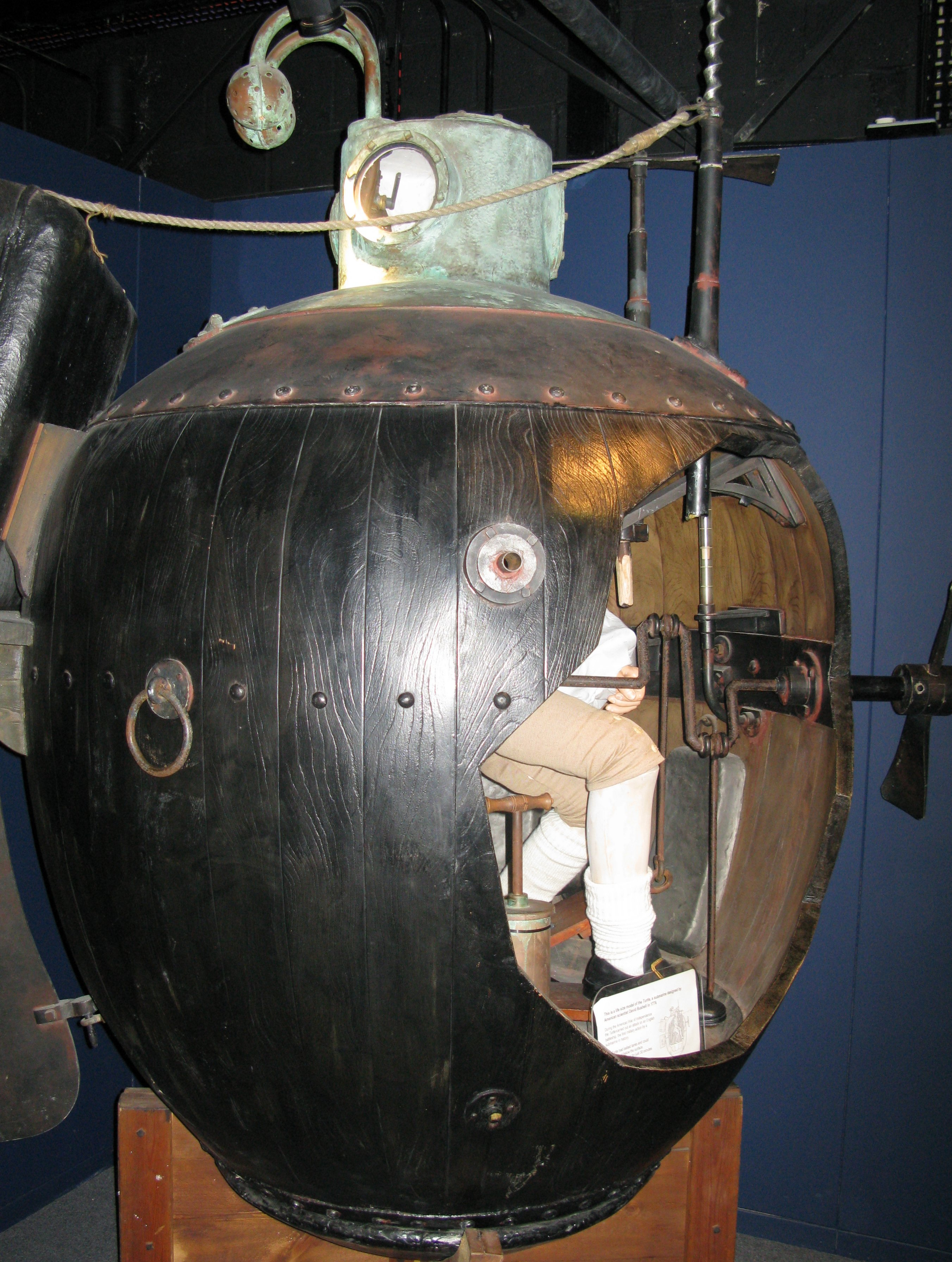
- A cutaway full-sized replica of the Turtle on display at the Royal Navy Submarine Museum, Gosport, UK

History

United States
- Name: Turtle
- Namesake: Turtle
- Builder: David Bushnell
- Laid down: 1775 251 years ago
- Launched: 1775
- Commissioned: 1775
- In service: 1775–1776
- Fate: destroyed when the British sunk the transport ship carrying her

General characteristics
- Class & type: Submarine or Submersible
- Displacement: 91 kg (201 lb)
- Length: 3.0 m (9 ft 10 in)
- Beam: 0.9 m (2 ft 11 in)
- Propulsion: Hand-cranked propellers
- Speed: 2.6 kn (4.8 km/h; 3.0 mph)
- Endurance: 30 min
- Notes: First submarine with a documented record of use in combat

Turtle (also called American Turtle) was an American vessel that is regarded as the world's first submarine, or by modern standards a submersible, with a documented record of use in naval combat. The name came from its inventor David Bushnell, who believed the craft resembled 'two upper shells of a Tortoise joined together'.

In 1775, Yale college students David Bushnell and Phineas Pratt invented a bomb that was able to detonate underwater and could be moved on a manual submarine. Later that year Bushnell took the idea a step further, developing a submersible that could be used to attach explosive charges to the hull of a harboured ship for use against the Royal Navy during the American Revolutionary War.

Connecticut Governor Jonathan Trumbull recommended the invention to George Washington, who provided funds and support for the development and testing of the machine.

Several attempts were made using Turtle to affix explosives to the undersides of British warships in New York Harbor in 1776. All failed, and her transport ship was sunk later that year by the British with the submarine aboard. Bushnell claimed eventually to have recovered the machine, but its final fate is unknown. Modern replicas of Turtle have been constructed and are on display in the Connecticut River Museum, the U.S. Navy's Submarine Force Library and Museum, the Royal Navy Submarine Museum, the International Spy Museum, and the Oceanographic Museum (Monaco).

== Development ==
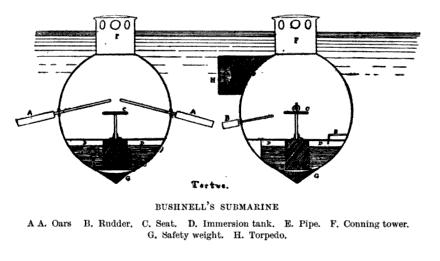
A diagram showing front and side views of Turtle

American inventor David Bushnell had the idea of a submersible vessel for use in lifting the British naval blockade during the American War of Independence. Bushnell may have begun studying underwater explosions while at Yale College. By early 1775, he had created a reliable method for detonating underwater explosives, a clockwork connected to a musket firing mechanism, probably a flintlock adapted for the purpose.

After the Battles of Lexington and Concord in April 1775, Bushnell began work near Old Saybrook on a small, individually manned submarine designed to attach an explosive charge to the hull of an enemy ship. He wrote to Benjamin Franklin that it would be "Constructed with Great Simplicity and upon Principles of Natural Philosophy."

Little is known about the origin, inspiration, and influences for Bushnell's invention. It seems clear that Bushnell knew of the work of Dutch inventor Cornelis Drebbel. According to Dr. Benjamin Gale, the many brass and mechanical parts of the submarine were built by New Haven inventor Isaac Doolittle, whose shop was just half a block from Yale.

Bushnell is given the overall design credit for the Turtle by Gale and others, but Doolittle was well known as an "ingenious mechanic", engraver, and metalworker. He had designed and manufactured complicated brass-wheel hall-clocks, a mahogany printing-press, brass compasses, and surveying instruments. He also owned a brass foundry where he cast bells. At the start of the American Revolution, Doolittle built a gunpowder mill with two partners in New Haven to support the war, and the Connecticut government sent him to prospect for lead.

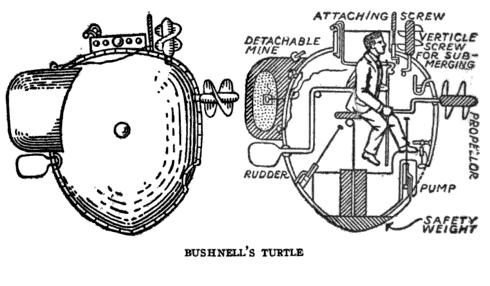
This 19th-century diagram shows the side views of Turtle. It incorrectly depicts the propeller as a screw blade; it was actually a paddle propeller blade, as seen in the replica shown above and reported by Sergeant Lee.

The design of the Turtle was necessarily shrouded in secrecy, but Doolittle probably designed and crafted the brass and moving parts of the Turtle, including the propulsion system, the navigation instruments, the brass foot-operated water-ballast and forcing pumps, the depth gauge and compass, the brass crown hatch, the clockwork detonator for the mine, and the hand-operated propeller crank and foot-driven treadle with flywheel.

According to a letter from Dr. Benjamin Gale to Benjamin Franklin, Doolittle also designed the mine attachment mechanism, "those Parts which Conveys the Powder, and secures the same to the Bottom of the Ship".

The most historically important innovation in the Turtle was the propeller, as it was the first known use of one in a watercraft. It was described as an "oar for rowing forward or backward", with "no precedent" design. Benjamin Gale described it to Silas Deane as "two oars or paddles" that were "like the arms of a windmill...twelve inches (30 cm) long, and about four inches (10 cm) wide." Manstan speculates that it was made of brass and was likely designed and forged by Doolittle.

In making the hull, Bushnell enlisted the services of several skilled artisans, including his brother Ezra Bushnell and ship's carpenter Phineas Pratt, both from Saybrook. The hull was "constructed of oak, somewhat like a barrel and bound by heavy wrought-iron hoops." The shape of the hull, Gale informed Silas Deane, "has the nearest resemblance to the two upper shells of a Tortoise joined together."

Turtle was about 10 feet (3.0 m) long (according to the original specifications), 6 feet (1.8 m) tall, and about 3 feet (0.9 m) wide, and consisted of two wooden shells covered with tar and reinforced with steel bands. It dived by allowing water into a bilge tank at the bottom of the vessel and resurfaced by pushing water out through a hand pump. It was propelled vertically and horizontally by hand-cranked and pedal-powered propellers, respectively. It also had 200 pounds (91 kg) of lead aboard, which could be released in a moment to increase buoyancy. It was manned and operated by one person and contained enough air for about 30 minutes. It had a speed in calm water of about 3 mph (2.6 kn; 4.8 km/h).

Six small pieces of thick glass in the top of the submarine provided natural light. The internal instruments had small pieces of bioluminescent foxfire affixed to the needles to indicate their position in the dark. During trials in November 1775, Bushnell discovered that this illumination failed when the temperature dropped too low. He repeatedly requested that Benjamin Franklin suggest possible alternatives, but Franklin did not suggest any and Turtle was sidelined for the winter.

Bushnell's basic design included some elements present in earlier experimental submersibles. The method of raising and lowering the vessel was similar to that developed by Nathaniel Simons in 1729, and the gaskets used to make watertight connections between the internal and external controls may have come from Simons, who constructed a submersible based on a 17th-century Italian design by Giovanni Alfonso Borelli.

== Preparation for use ==
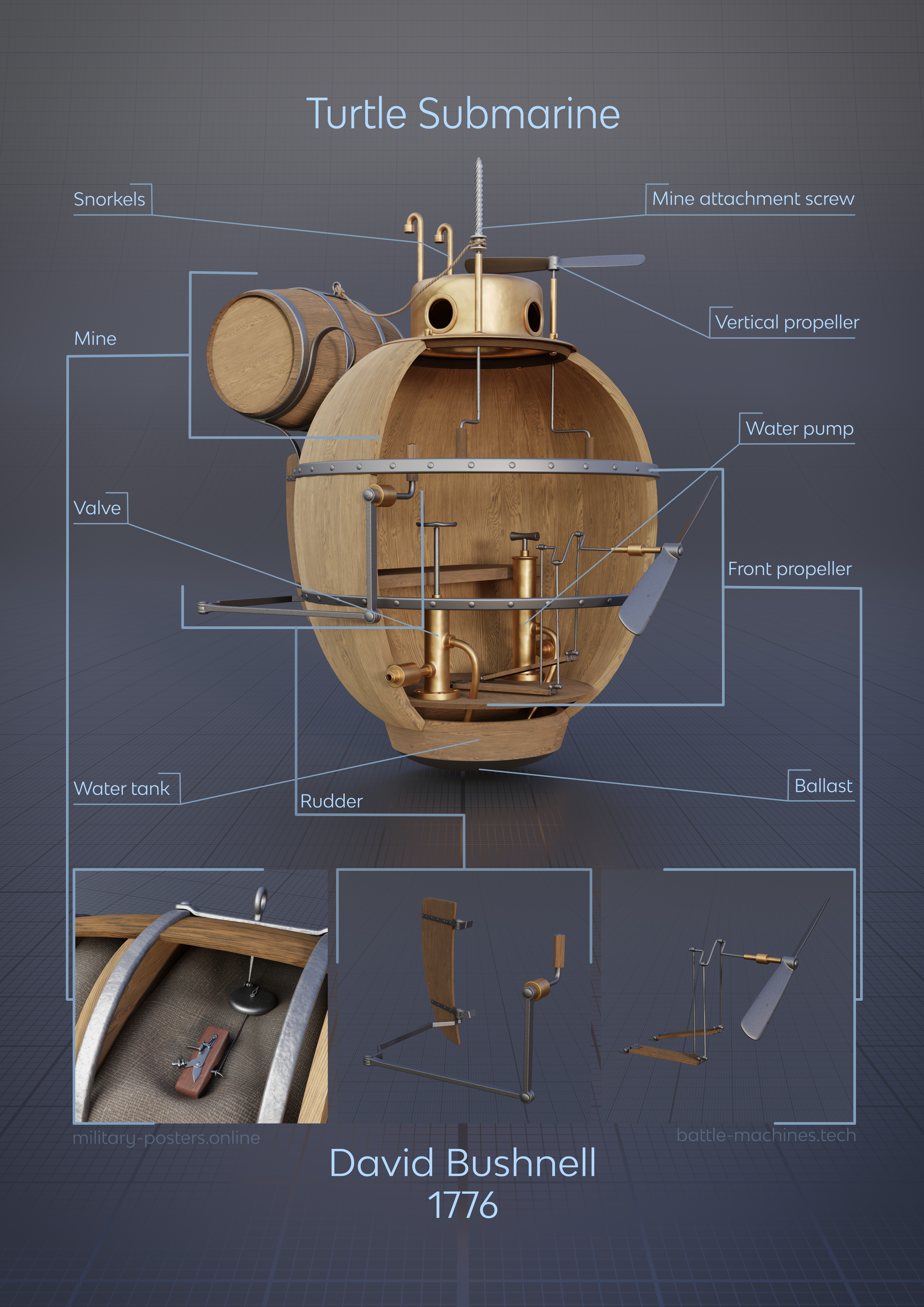
Turtle submarine design explained

Funding was one of Bushnell's central concerns as he planned and constructed the Turtle. Colonial records concerning the Turtle are often short and cryptic, due to efforts to keep it secret from the British, and most of the records that do exist concern Bushnell's request for funds. Bushnell met with Connecticut Governor Jonathan Trumbull during 1771 seeking financial support. Trumbull also sent requests to George Washington and Thomas Jefferson. Jefferson was intrigued by the possibilities, while Washington remained skeptical of devoting funds from the Continental Army, whose funding was already being stretched.

Several setbacks plagued the design process. The mine in particular was delayed several times from its expected completion from 1771 to 1776. Piloting the Turtle, moreover, required great physical stamina and coordination. The operator would have to adjust the bilge in order to keep from sinking while providing propulsion by use of a crank, which worked a propeller on the front of the submarine, and simultaneously directing the submarine with a lever that operated a rudder at the back. The cabin also held air for only 30 minutes of use, after which the operator would have to surface and replenish the air through a ventilator. Training would be needed in order to ensure the project's success due to the complex nature of the machine.

"The boat was moved from Ezra's farm on the Westbrook Road to what is now Ayer's Point in Old Saybrook on the Connecticut River," writes historian Lincoln Diamant. Bushnell did the initial testing of his submarine on the Connecticut River, choosing his brother Ezra as the pilot. In August 1776, Bushnell asked General Samuel Holden Parsons for volunteers to operate Turtle because his brother Ezra was taken ill. Three men were chosen, and the submersible was taken to Long Island Sound for training and further trials. While these trials went on, the British gained control of western Long Island in the August 27 Battle of Long Island, giving them control of New York harbor. Turtle was transported overland from New Rochelle to the Hudson River.

After two weeks of training, Turtle was towed to New York, and Sgt. Ezra Lee prepared to use it to attack HMS Eagle, flagship of the blockade squadron. Destroying this symbol of British naval power by means of a submarine would be a blow to British morale and could threaten the British blockade and control of New York Harbor. The plan was to have Lee surface just behind Eagle's rudder and use a screw to attach an explosive to the ship's hull. Lee would then dive the Turtle and make his escape.

== Attack on the Eagle ==
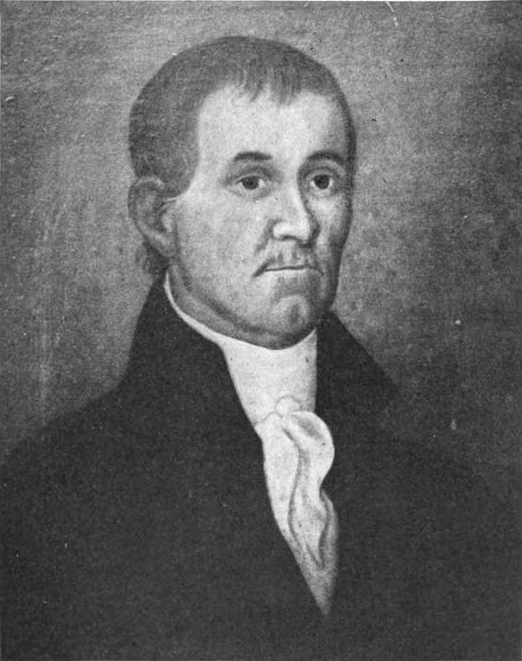
Portrait of Ezra Lee, Turtle's operator

At 11:00 pm on September 7, 1776, Sgt. Lee piloted the submersible toward Admiral Richard Howe's flagship HMS Eagle, then maneuvered it out to the anchorage off Governors Island. It took two hours to reach his destination, as it was hard work manipulating the hand-operated controls and foot pedals to propel the submersible. Adding to his difficulties was a fairly strong current and the darkness, which made visibility difficult.

Lee began his mission with only 20 minutes of air, and the darkness, the speed of the currents, and the added complexities all combined to thwart his plan. Once surfaced, Lee lit the fuse on the explosive and tried multiple times to stab the device into the underside of the ship, but he was not able to pierce Eagle's hull. He abandoned the operation when the timer on the explosive was due to go off, and he feared getting caught at dawn. A popular story held that he failed due to the copper lining covering the ship's hull. The Royal Navy had recently begun installing copper sheathing on the bottoms of their warships to protect from damage by shipworms and other marine life; however, the lining was paper-thin and could not have stopped Lee from drilling through it. Bushnell believed that Lee's failure was probably due to an iron plate connected to the ship's rudder hinge. Lee attempted another spot on the hull, but he was unable to stay beneath the ship and eventually abandoned the attempt.

Lee reported that British soldiers on Governors Island spotted the submersible and rowed out to investigate. He then released the charge (called a torpedo), "expecting that they would seize that likewise, and thus all would be blown to atoms." The British were suspicious of the drifting torpedo and retreated back to the island. Lee reported that the charge drifted into the East River, where it exploded "with tremendous violence, throwing large columns of water and pieces of wood that composed it high into the air." It was the first use of a submarine to attack a ship, but the only records documenting it are American. British records contain no accounts of an attack by a submarine or any reports of explosions on the night of the attack on Eagle.

British naval historian Richard Compton-Hall has questioned whether these events even occurred. He claims that the problems of achieving neutral buoyancy would have rendered the vertical propeller useless. The route that Turtle would have taken to attack Eagle was slightly across the tidal stream which would have likely resulted in Lee becoming exhausted. In the face of these and other problems, Compton-Hall suggests that the entire story was fabricated as disinformation and morale-boosting propaganda, and if Lee did carry out an attack it was in a covered rowing boat rather than Turtle.

Despite Turtle's failure, Washington called Bushnell "a Man of great Mechanical Powers, fertile of invention and a master in execution." In retrospect, Washington observed in a letter to Thomas Jefferson: "[Bushnell] came to me in 1776 recommended by Governor Trumbull (now dead) and other respectable characters… Although I wanted faith myself, I furnished him with money, and other aids to carry it into execution. He laboured for some time ineffectually and, though the advocates for his scheme continued sanguine, he never did succeed. One accident or another was always intervening. I then thought, and still think, that it was an effort of genius; but that a combination of too many things were requisite."

Turtle's attack on Eagle reflected both the ingenuity of American forces after the fall of New York and the American tendency to embrace new, sometimes radical, technologies. "What astonishment it will produce and what advantages may be made… if it succeeds, more easy for you to conceive than for me to describe," physician Benjamin Gale wrote to Silas Deane less than a year before Turtle's mission.

== Aftermath ==
Bushnell mines destroying a small British boat

On October 5, Sergeant Lee again went out in an attempt to attach the charge to a frigate anchored off Manhattan. He reported the ship's watch spotted him, so he abandoned the attempt.

Turtle was lost on October 9, 1776, while aboard the sloop serving as her tender when the Royal Navy frigates HMS Phoenix, HMS Roebuck, and HMS Tartar sank the sloop by gunfire in the Hudson River near Fort Washington on Manhattan and Fort Lee, New Jersey. Bushnell reported salvaging Turtle, but its final fate is unknown. Washington called the attempt "an effort of genius", but "a combination of too many things was requisite" for such an attempt to succeed.

Following Turtle's abortive attack in New York Harbor, Bushnell continued his work in underwater explosives. In 1777, he devised mines to be towed for an attack on HMS Cerberus near New London harbor in Connecticut and to be floated down the Delaware River in an attempt to interrupt the British fleet off Philadelphia. Both attempts failed; On August 13, 1777, a Bushnell floating mine/keg sank a small (captured) schooner/tender to HMS Cerberus, in Black Point Bay, New London, killing three sailors and saving 1 man. Regarding the floating mines; the only casualties were two curious young boys who were killed by a mine/keg and alerting the British. The latter attempt occupied a brief, if farcical, place in the literature of the war. Francis Hopkinson's poem "Battle of the Kegs," captured the surprising, if futile, venture: "The soldier flew, the sailor too, and, scared almost to death, sir, wore out their shoes to spread the news, and ran till out of breath, sir."

When the Connecticut government refused to fund further underwater project, Bushnell joined the Continental Army as a captain-lieutenant of sappers and miners, and served with distinction for several years the Hudson River in New York. After the war, Bushnell drifted into obscurity. He visited France for several years, then moved to Georgia in 1795 under the assumed name of David Bush, where he taught school and practiced medicine. He died largely unknown in Georgia in 1824. After the war, inventors such as Robert Fulton were influenced by Bushnell's designs in the development of underwater explosives.

== Replicas ==
The Turtle was the first submarine used for combat and led to the development of what we know today as the modern submarine, forever changing underwater warfare and the face of naval warfare. As such, the Turtle has been replicated many times to show new audience the roots of submarine technology, how much it has changed, and the influence it has had on modern submarines. By the 1950s, historian of technology Brooke Hindle credited the Turtle as "the greatest of the wartime inventions." The Turtle remains a source of national as well as regional pride, which led to the construction of several replicas, a number of which exist in Bushnell's home state of Connecticut. As Benjamin Gale noted in 1775, the vessel was "constructed with great simplicity," and it has thus inspired at least four replicas. Many of these followed the designs set down by Bushnell, with "precise and comprehensive descriptions of his submarine," which aided the replication process.

The vessel was a source of particular pride in Connecticut. In 1976, a replica of Turtle was designed by Joseph Leary and constructed by Fred Frese as a project marking the United States Bicentennial. It was christened by Connecticut's governor, Ella Grasso, and later tested in the Connecticut River. This replica is owned by the Connecticut River Museum.

In 2002, Rick and Laura Brown, two sculptors from Massachusetts, along with Massachusetts College of Art and Design students and faculty, constructed another replica. The Browns set out to gain a better understanding of human ingenuity while keeping Bushnell's design, materials, and technique authentic. "With it, Yankee ingenuity was born," observed Rick Brown, referring to the latest in a long line of commemoration that perceived the Turtle as something authentically American. Of the temptation to use synthetic and ahistorical materials, Rob Duarte, a MassArts student observed, "It was always a temptation to use silicone to seal the thing. Then you realized that someone else had to figure this out with the same limited resources that we were using. That's just an interesting way to learn. You can't do it any other way than by actually doing it." The outer shell of the replica was hollowed, using controlled fire, from a 12-foot (3.7 m) Sitka spruce. The log was 7 feet (2.1 m) in diameter and shipped from British Columbia. This replica took twelve days to build and was successfully submerged in water. In 2003, it was tested in an indoor test tank at the United States Naval Academy. Lew Nuckols, a professor of Ocean Engineering at USNA, made ten dives, noting "you feel very isolated from the outside world. If you had any sense of claustrophobia it would not be a very good experience." The replica is currently on display at the International Spy Museum in Washington, DC.

In 2003, Roy Manstan, Fred Frese, and the Naval Underwater Warfare Center partnered with students from Old Saybrook High School in Connecticut on a four-year project called The Turtle Project, to construct their own working replica, which they completed and launched in 2007.

On August 3, 2007 three men were stopped by police while escorting and piloting a replica based on the Turtle within 200 feet (61 m) of RMS Queen Mary 2, then docked at the cruise ship terminal in Red Hook, Brooklyn. The replica was created by New York artist Philip "Duke" Riley and two residents of Rhode Island, one of whom claimed to be a descendant of David Bushnell. Riley claimed that he wanted to film himself next to the Queen Mary 2 for his upcoming gallery show. Riley's was not an exact replica, however, measuring 8 feet (2.4 m) tall and made of cheap plywood then coated with fiberglass. Its portholes and hatch were collected from a marine salvage company. He also installed pumps to allow him to add or remove water for ballast. Riley christened his vessel Acorn, to note the deviation from Bushnell's original design. The vessel, reported the New York Times, "resembled something out of Jules Verne by way of Huck Finn, manned by cast members from 'Jackass.' The Coast Guard issued Riley a citation for having an unsafe vessel, and for violating the security zone around Queen Mary 2. The NYPD also impounded the submarine. Police Commissioner Raymond W. Kelly, calling this an incident of "marine mischief" assured the public that this was simply an art project and did not, in fact, represent a terrorist threat to the passenger ship.

In 2015, the replica built by Manstan and Frese in 2007 for The Turtle Project was acquired by Privateer Media and used in the television series TURN: Washington's Spies. The submarine was shipped to Richmond, where it underwent a full refit and was relaunched for film use in the water. Additional full-scale interior and exterior models were also made by AMC as part of the production.

Also in 2015, Privateer Media used The Turtle Project replica for the Travel Channel series Follow Your Past, hosted by Alison Stewart. Filming took place in August where the submarine was launched with a tether in the Connecticut River in the town of Essex, CT.

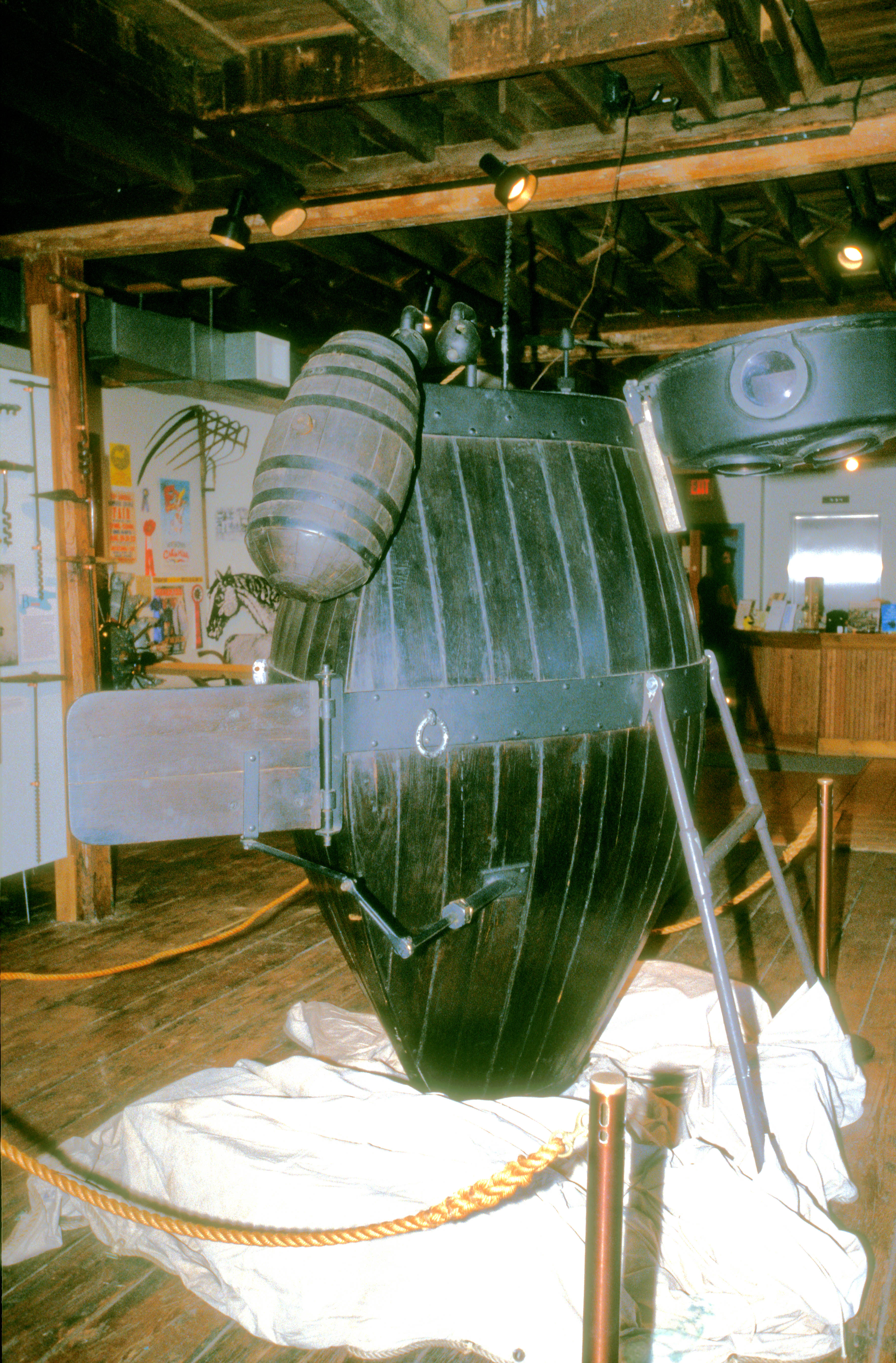
1976 functional replica that is now at the Connecticut River Museum

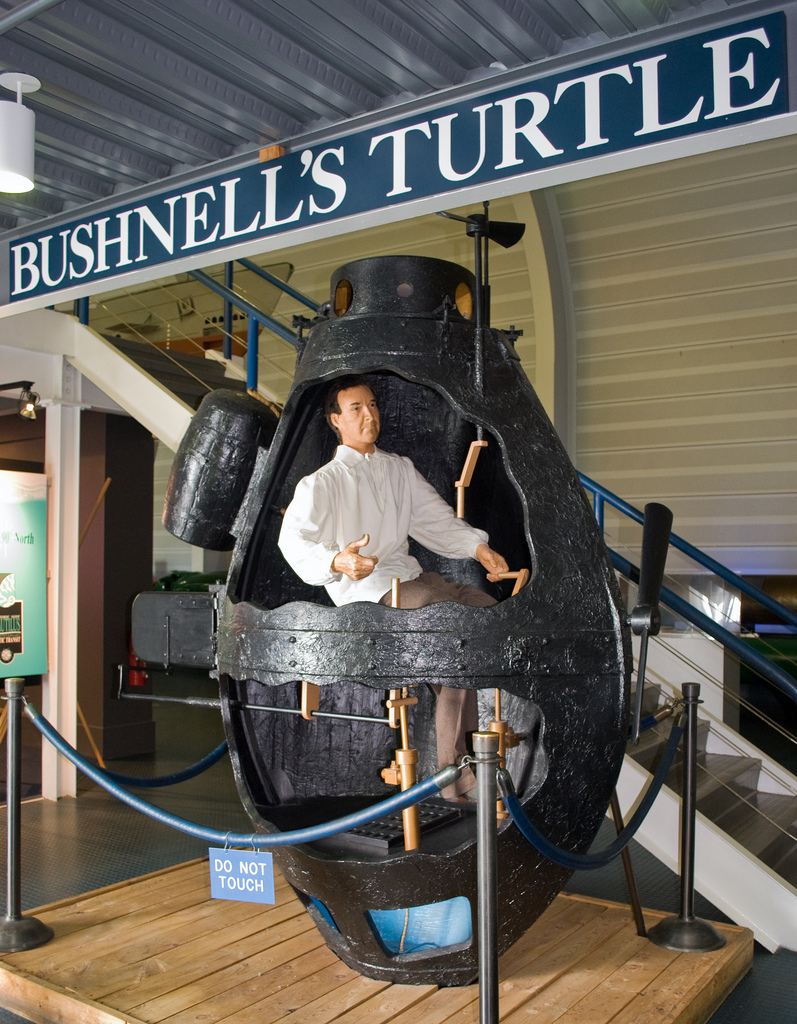
Cutaway replica at the Submarine Force Library and Museum, Groton, Connecticut

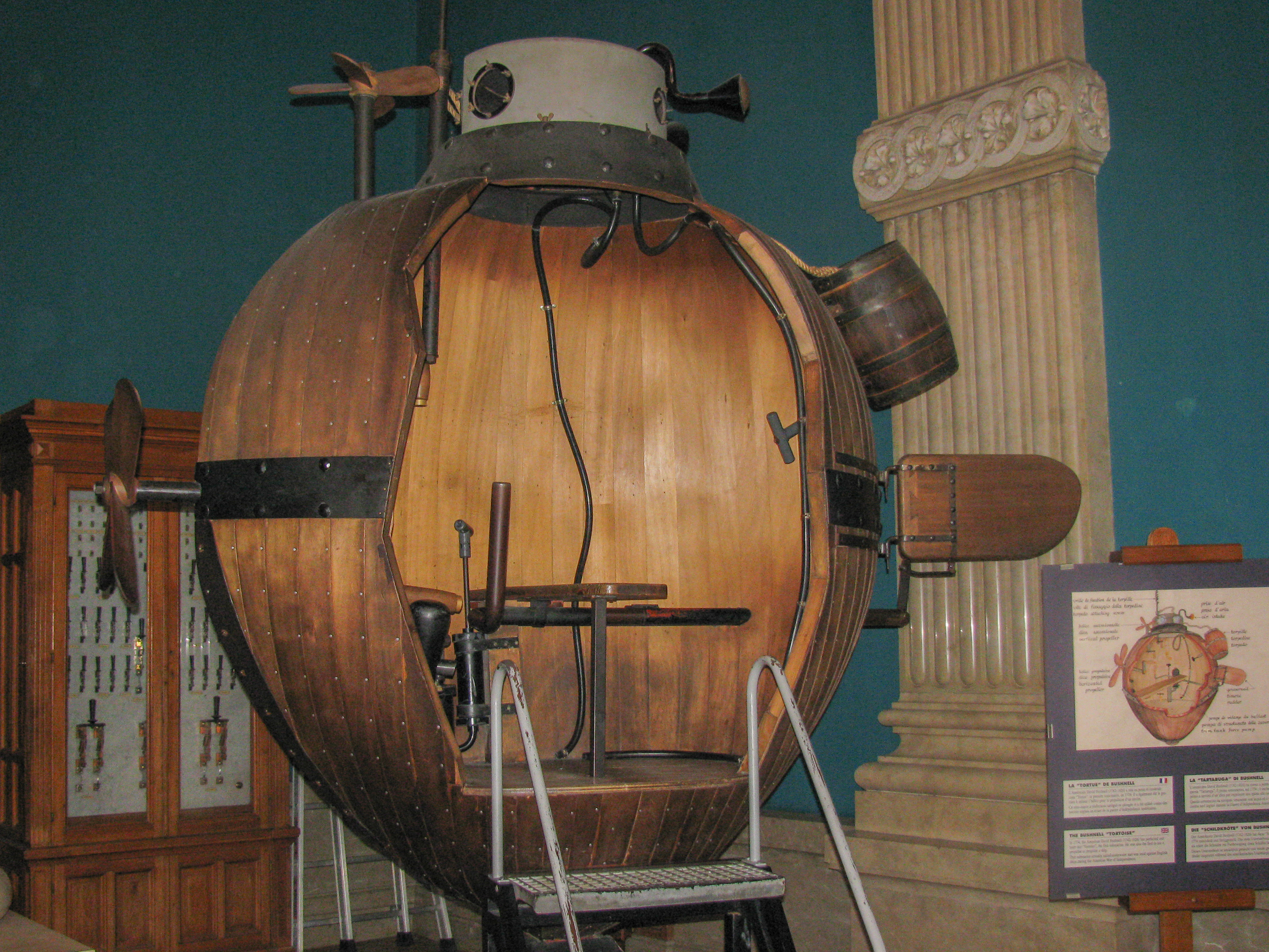
Cutaway replica at the Oceanographic Museum, Monaco

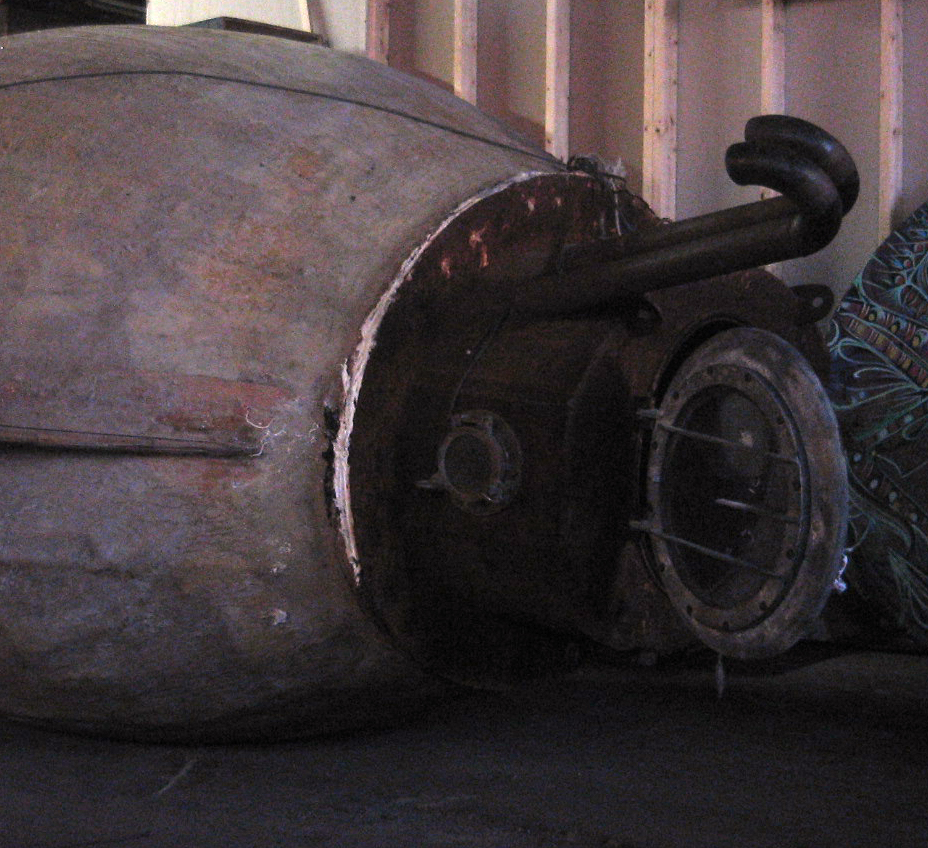
2007 functional replica created by Philip "Duke" Riley
