= Submarine Force Library and Museum =

Coordinates: 41°23′23″N 72°05′21″W

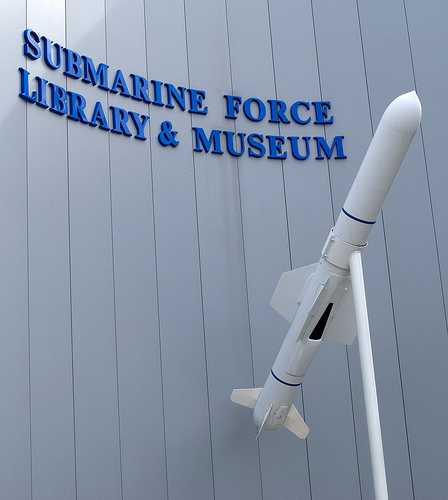
- A UGM-84 missile outside the entrance
- Established: 1955
- Location: Groton, Connecticut
- Type: Military museum
- Collection size: 33,000 artifacts 20,000 significant documents 30,000 photographs
- Visitors: 150,000/year
- Directors: LCDR Bryan R. Chapman, USN
- Curator: Meghan Rathbun
- Website: www.ussnautilus.org

The United States Navy Submarine Force Library and Museum is located on the Thames River in Groton, Connecticut. It is the only submarine museum managed exclusively by the Naval History & Heritage Command division of the Navy, and this makes it a repository for many special submarine items of national significance, including USS Nautilus (SSN-571). Visitors may take a 30-minute self-guided audio tour of the Nautilus.

== History ==
The Electric Boat Company (EB) established the museum in 1955 as the Submarine Library. EB donated it to the Navy in 1964, and the Navy moved it to its current location next to Naval Submarine Base New London. It received its official title in 1969. The "Connecticut Nautilus Committee" was formed in 1984 to raise funds for an improved museum, hoping to convince the Navy to donate the Nautilus. A new 14,000-square-foot (1,300 m^{2}) facility was built with funding from the state, individuals, and businesses, opening in 1986. In late 1997, the Committee started planning and raising funds for a 13,465-square-foot (1,250.9 m^{2}) addition to the museum building. Fund raising started the next year, and the construction project ran from 1998 to early 2000. The new addition was officially opened to the public on April 28, 2000 "in conjunction with the Centennial Celebration of the United States Submarine Force", according to the museum.

== Collection and permanent exhibits ==
The museum has 33,000 artifacts including the USS Nautilus, the first nuclear-powered submarine in the world. Nautilus was launched in 1954 and decommissioned in 1980. It traveled under the polar ice cap and reached the North Pole during the Cold War. Also at the museum is a replica of David Bushnell's Turtle, built in 1775 and the first submarine used in combat. Other exhibits include midget submarines from World War II, working periscopes, salvaged parts from the nuclear Submarine NR-1, a submarine control room, models of submarines, and Submarine X-1, an experimental military submarine. The sail section from the USS George Washington, the first nuclear powered ballistic missile sub, is on outdoor display near the main entrance.

The museum also has a library with around 20,000 documents and 30,000 photos related to the history of submarine development. The library also includes 6,000 books related to the field of submarine history, including a 1551 text on submarine retrieval, and an 1870 copy of Jules Verne's Twenty Thousand Leagues Under the Seas with a model of the fictional Nautilus. Documents in the collection include notes and calculations by John Philip Holland for the Navy's first commissioned submarine, "one-of-a-kind artifacts from World War I and World War II", and the submarine library collections of Electric Boat Corporation and the Navy.

Connecticut magazine called the museum "an absolute gem worth exploring" with the USS Nautilus as "the star attraction". Anna Mundow in Fodor's guide to Connecticut and Rhode Island asserts that "students of modern military history will be impressed" by the museum.

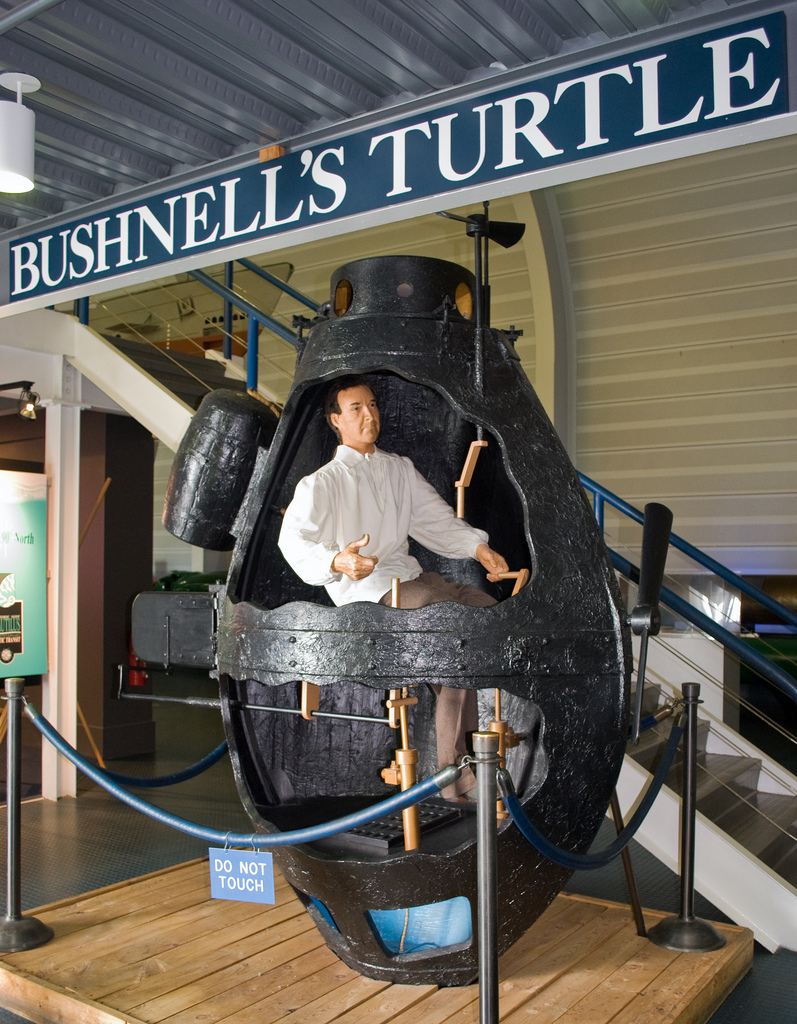
Replica of Bushnell's Turtle

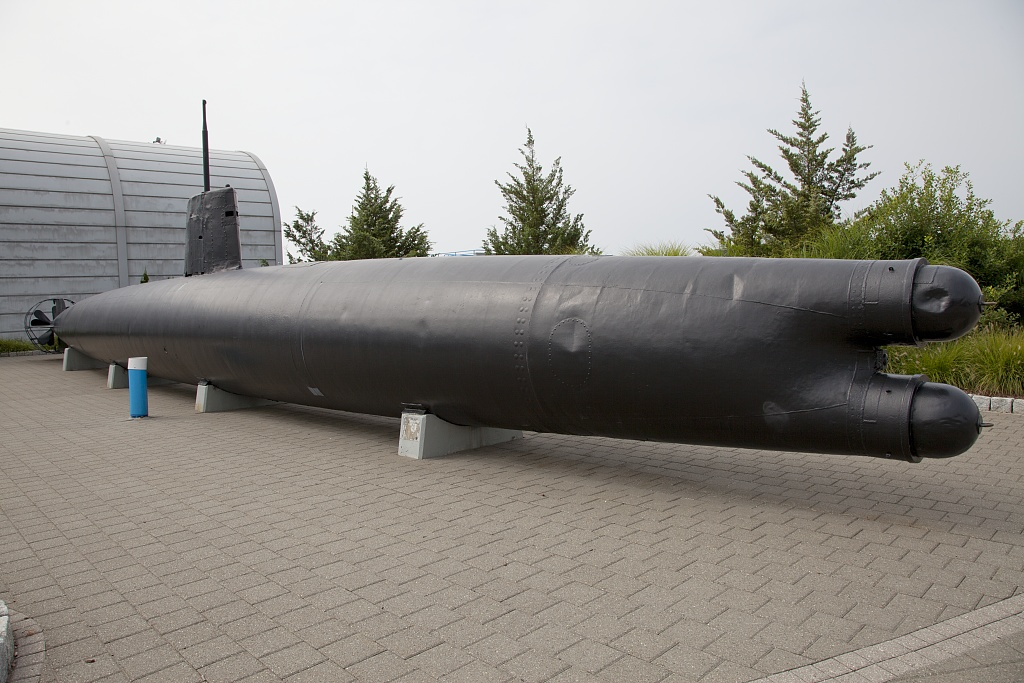
HA-8 Japanese midget submarine

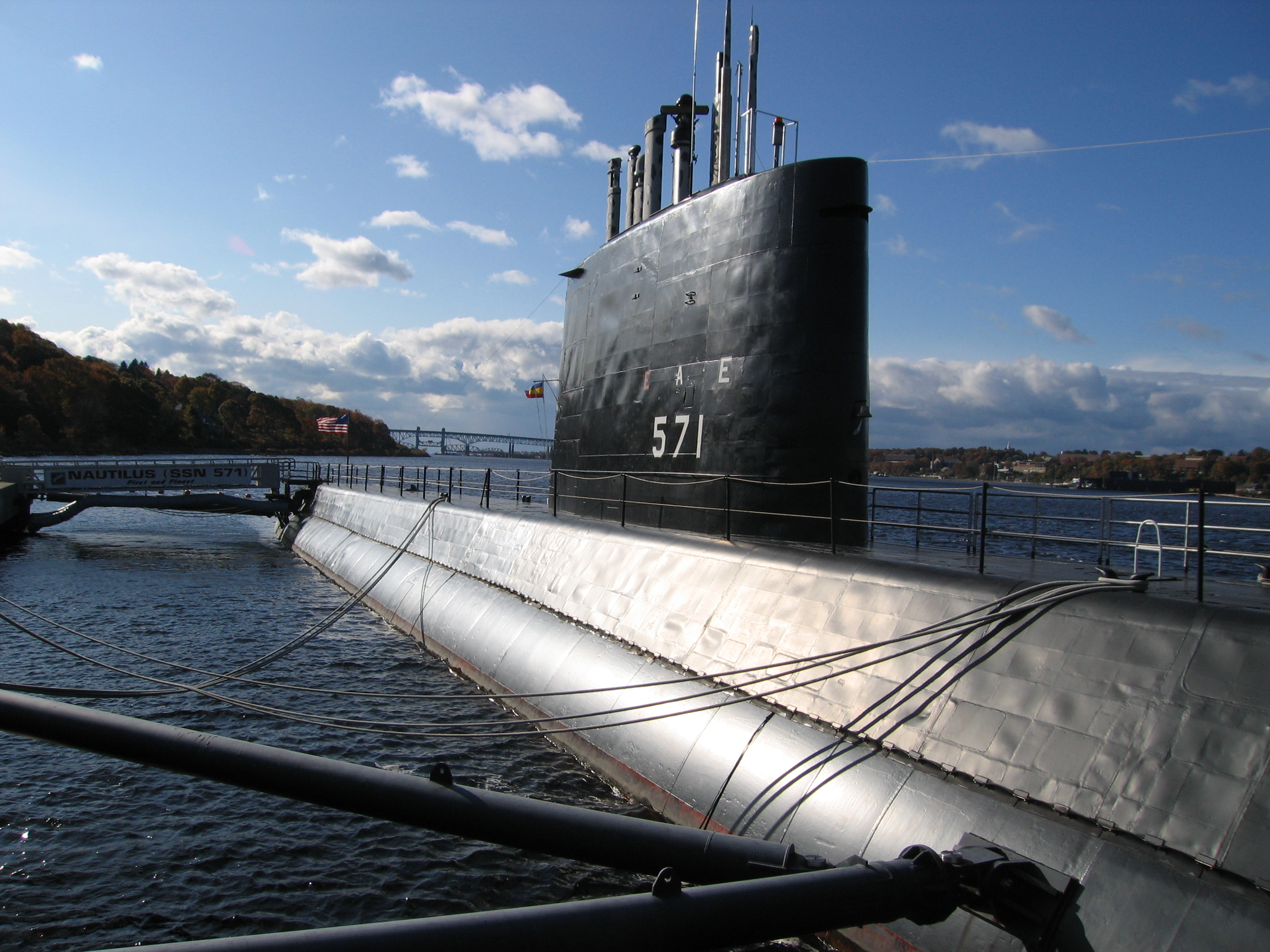
The Nautilus

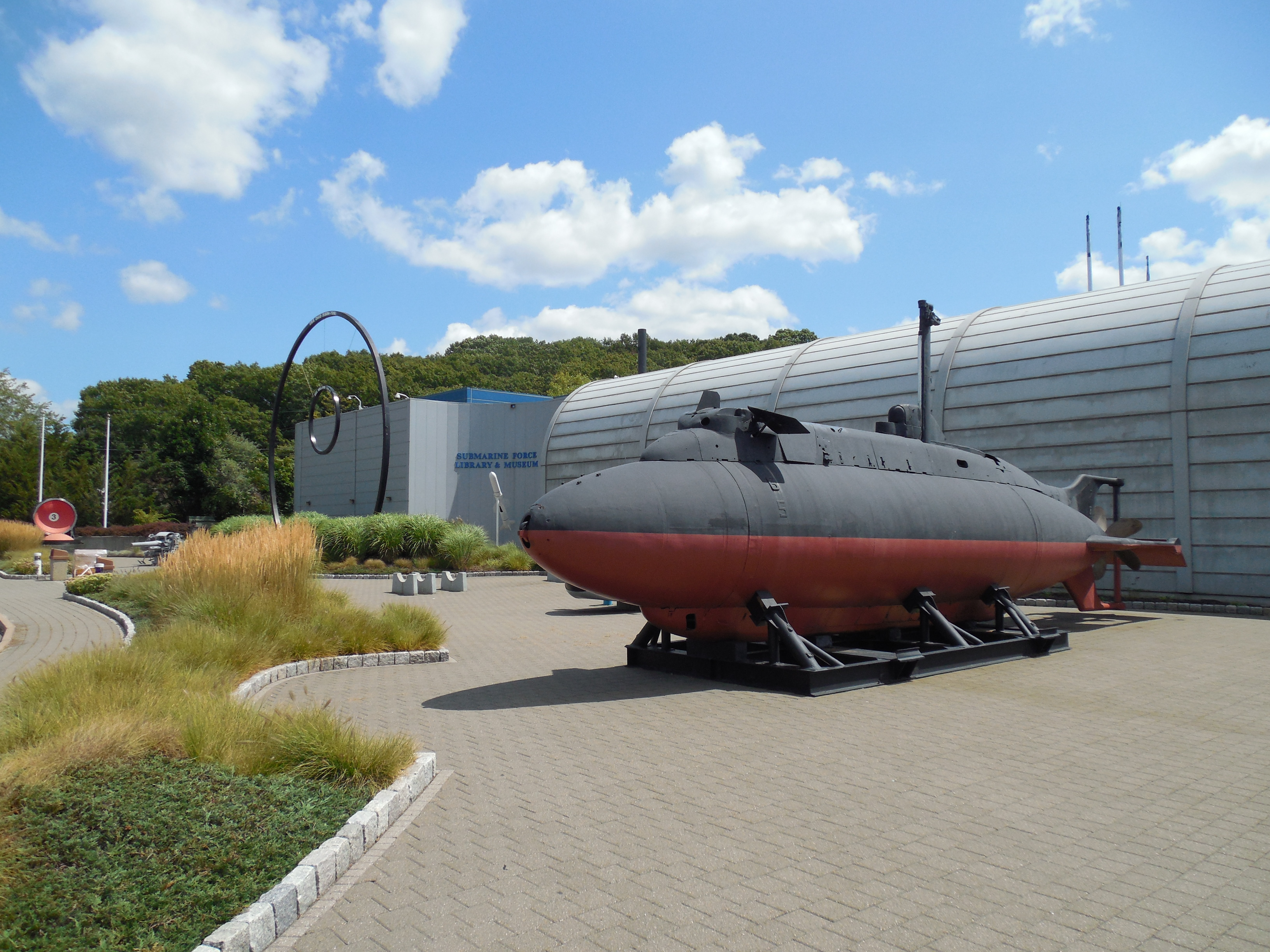
SS X-1 Midget Submarine outside museum

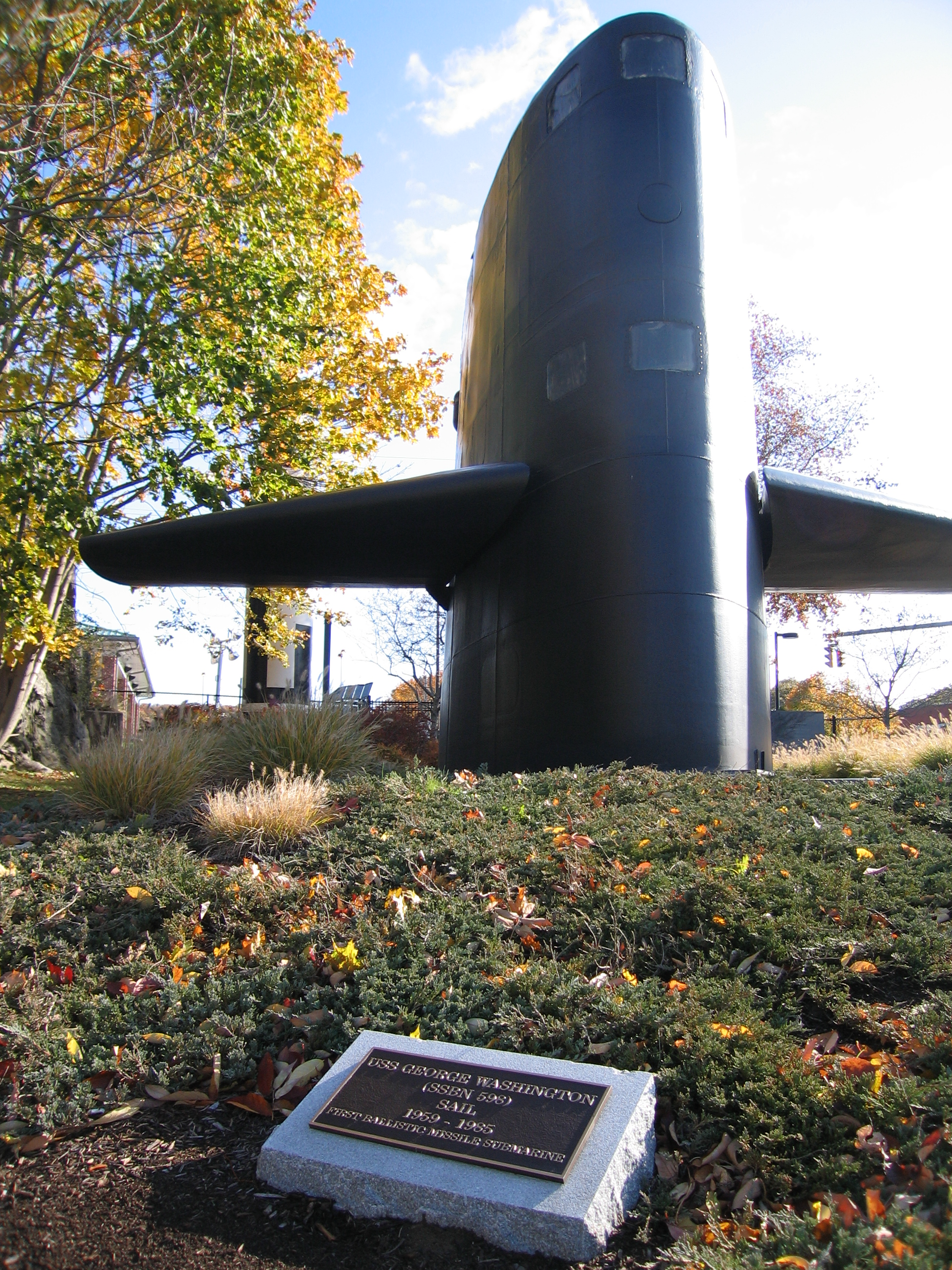
George Washington sail

== See also ==
- United States Naval Undersea Museum
- Royal Navy Submarine Museum
- List of maritime museums in the United States
