= David Bushnell (inventor) =

American inventor who built the "Turtle" submersible (1740–1824)

- Born: August 30, 1740; Saybrook, Connecticut, British America
- Died: 1824 (aged 83–84); Warrenton, Georgia, U.S.
- Occupation: Inventor
- Known for: Building "Turtle" submersible

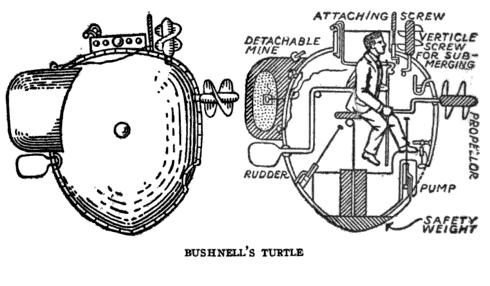
A diagram of Bushnell's American Turtle

David Bushnell (August 30, 1740 – 1824) was an American inventor, patriot, teacher, and a medical doctor.

Bushnell invented the first submarine to be used in battle, Turtle, as well as a floating mine triggered by contact. He was a veteran of the Revolutionary War.

== Early life ==
David Bushnell was born in a secluded part of Saybrook, Connecticut on 30 August 1740 and baptized in 1753 into a farming family in what is now Westbrook, Connecticut where his parents Nehemiah Bushnell and Sarah (Susan) Ingham Bushnell owned a farm. He was the first of five children born. Following the death of his father circa 1769, he sold his half interest in the family Westbrook farm to his brother Ezra and entered Yale College in 1771 at the relatively old age of 31.

== The Turtle submarine ==
Bushnell is credited with creating the first submarine ever used in combat, while studying at Yale in 1775. He called it Turtle because of its look in the water. His idea of using water as ballast for submerging and raising his submarine is still in use, as is the screw propeller, which was used in Turtle.

While at Yale, Bushnell proved that gunpowder could be exploded under water. He used this knowledge not only in construction of the underwater mine but later in creating floating torpedoes that exploded on contact. Working with the wealthy New Haven inventor, clock-maker, and brass foundry-man Isaac Doolittle, he also co-developed the first mechanically triggered time bomb as well as one of the first ship's propeller. He combined these ideas by building Turtle which was designed to attack ships by attaching a time bomb to their hulls, while using a hand powered drill and ship auger bit to penetrate the hulls.

On September 7, 1776, Turtle, manned by Sergeant Ezra Lee of the Continental Army, was used to attack the British 64-gun ship of the line HMS Eagle which was moored in New York Harbor. However, Turtle's attack failed.

Turtle was lost while being transported aboard a sloop; the sloop was discovered and sunk by British frigates leaving Bloomingdale.

== Attack on HMS Cerberus ==
Realizing that Turtle was impractical as a weapon, Bushnell turned to explosive devices that he called torpedoes first used as a name for electric rays (in the order Torpediniformes), which in turn comes from the Latin word torpēdō ("lethargy" or "sluggishness"). On August 13, 1777, Bushnell attempted to use a floating mine to blow up HMS Cerberus in Niantic Bay; the mine struck a small boat near Cerberus and detonated killing four sailors and destroying the vessel, but not the intended target. In 1778 he launched what became lauded as the Battle of the Kegs, in which a series of mines was floated down the Delaware River to attack British ships anchored there, killing two curious young boys and alerting the British. The attack was ineffectual.

== Continental Army service ==
In 1778, General Washington proposed the formation of a new military unit to be known as the "Corps of Sappers and Miners" (i.e. combat engineers) and in the summer of the next year it was organized. Bushnell was given command of the Corps with the rank of captain-lieutenant on August 2, 1779. On May 6, 1779, he was taken prisoner in Middlesex Parish, now Darien, Connecticut, and was later exchanged.

On June 8, 1781, Bushnell was commissioned as a captain in the Continental Army and was at the Siege of Yorktown in September and October of that year. This was the only time the Sappers and Miners had had the opportunity to serve in combat.

Bushnell served in the Army until he was discharged on June 3, 1783. He then became an original member of the Connecticut Society of the Cincinnati, an organization formed by officers who were veterans of the Continental Army and Navy.

At some point after the Revolution, Bushnell was presented a medal by George Washington.

== Later life ==
After peace was declared he returned to Connecticut where he lived until 1787 when he abruptly moved to France. His activities in France are unknown, although it has been speculated that he may have collaborated with inventor Robert Fulton in developing a design for a submarine.

In 1803 Bushnell settled in Warrenton, Georgia under the pseudonym of David Bush. He taught at the Warrenton Academy and practiced medicine. He died in Warrenton in 1824.

== Legacy ==
A full sized model of David Bushnell's Turtle is on display at the U.S. Navy Submarine Force Library and Museum in Groton, Connecticut.

In 1915, the U.S. Navy named the submarine tender USS Bushnell (AS-2) after him and it was launched in Bremerton, Washington. Bushnell served during World War I and was renamed USS Sumner in 1940 and was present during the Japanese attack on Pearl Harbor on December 7, 1941. She was employed as a survey ship during World War II and was decommissioned in 1946.

On 14 September 1942, another submarine tender of the same name USS Bushnell (AS-15) was launched. Bushnell served during World War II and later was the flagship of Submarine Squadron 12 in Key West, Florida from 1952 until she was decommissioned in 1970.

In 2004 the Georgia House of Representatives passed a resolution declaring August 30, 2004 as David Bushnell Day in Georgia.
