= Connecticut River Museum =

Maritime museum in Connecticut, US

Coordinates: 41.3518°N 72.3851°W

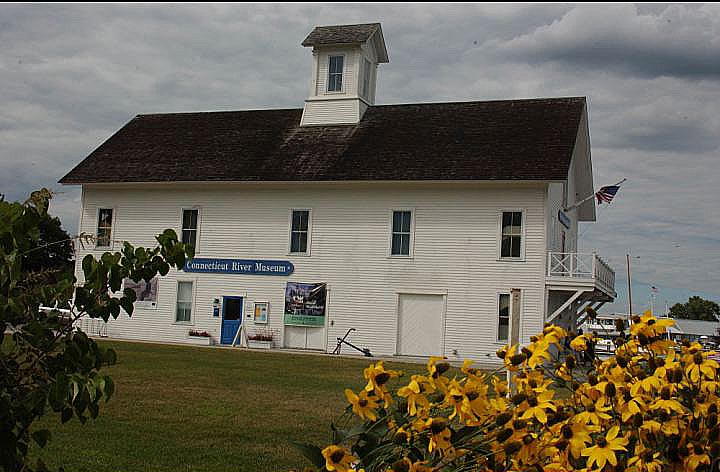
- Established: 1975
- Location: Essex, Connecticut, USA
- Type: Maritime museum
- Website: http://www.ctrivermuseum.org/

- Steamboat Dock Site
- U.S. National Register of Historic Places
- Location: 67 Main Street, Essex, Connecticut
- Area: 0.8 acres (0.32 ha)
- Built: 1813
- Architectural style: Georgian
- NRHP reference No.: 82003768
- Added to NRHP: April 1, 1982

The Connecticut River Museum is a U.S. educational and cultural institution based at Steamboat Dock in Essex, Connecticut that focuses on the marine environment and maritime heritage of the Connecticut River Valley.

The three-story Connecticut River Museum is located in a restored 1878 steamboat warehouse, which is now the only one of its type remaining on the river, and has been listed on the National Register of Historic Places. The museum opened to the public in 1975, with Connecticut Governor Ella Grasso as its first paid member and ex officio patron. The core of its collection came from the Wadsworth Atheneum in Hartford, Connecticut, which provided the museum with a loan of nautical artwork, navigation equipment and maritime-related artifacts.

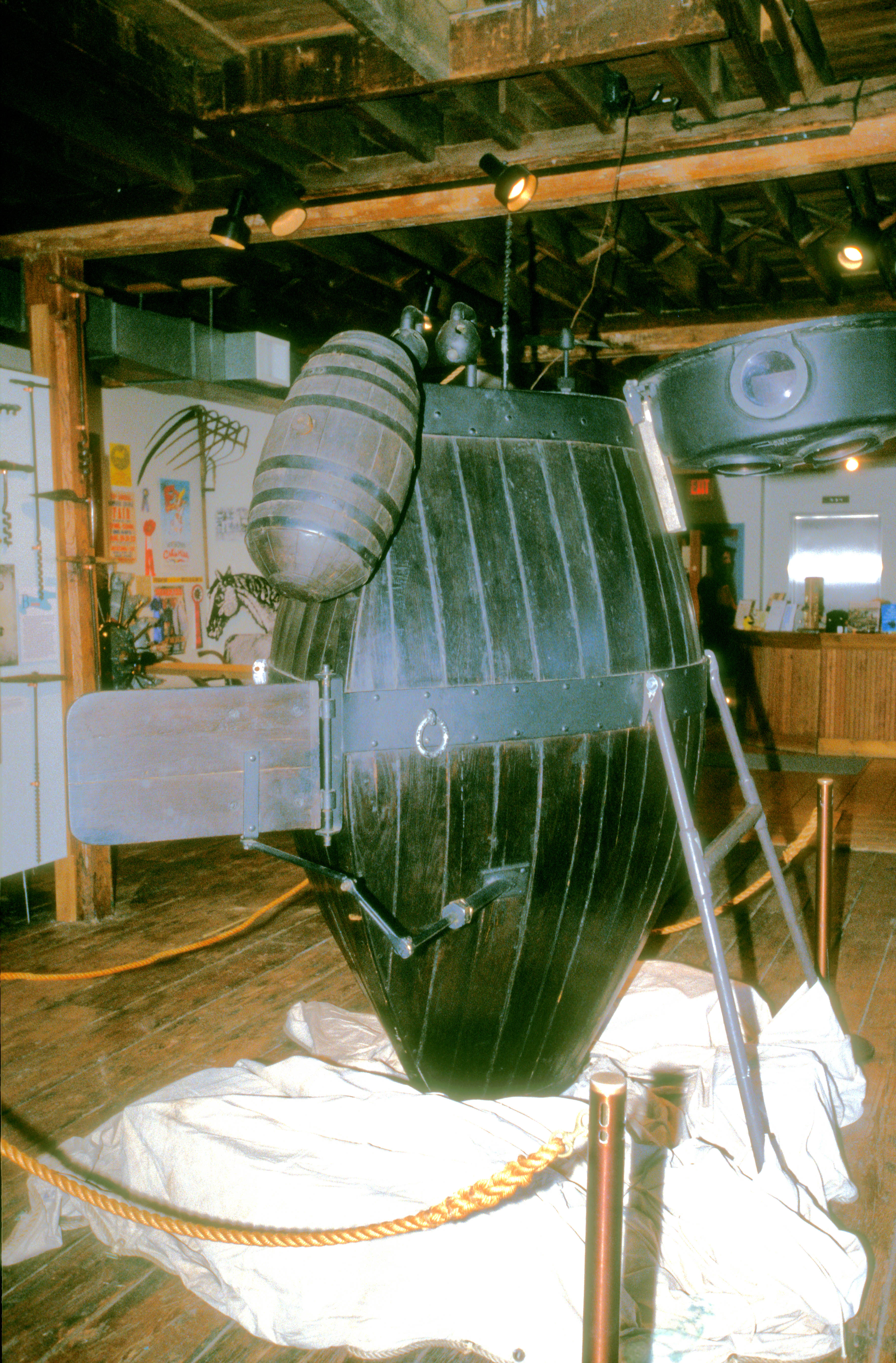
Replica of the Turtle

The museum's main and third levels offer changing exhibits, while its second level is home to a permanent exhibition on shipbuilding, which includes historical maps and models of steamboats and exhibits on the piscine species in the Connecticut River.

The museum's collection also includes a full-scale replica of Turtle, the first American submarine, which was constructed in Essex in 1776 for use against the British in the American Revolution. The museum property also includes a boathouse and a research library. In December 1995, the museum was given a triangular 1-acre (4,000 m^{2}) waterfront property, valued at US$910,000, in the neighboring village of Old Saybrook, Connecticut, by Bill and Victoria Winterer, who were among the museums co-founders. The property is used as a waterfront park managed by the museum. In 2011 the museum caught fire. They had to rebuild part of it.

== See also ==
- National Register of Historic Places listings in Middlesex County, Connecticut
- List of maritime museums in the United States
