= HMS Eagle (1774) =

Third-rate ship of the Royal Navy, in service from 1774 to 1812

- Eagle

History

→ Great Britain → United Kingdom
- Name: HMS Eagle
- Ordered: 14 January 1771
- Builder: Wells, Rotherhithe
- Laid down: April 1771
- Launched: 2 May 1774
- Honours and awards: Participated in: Battle of Sadras (1782); Battle of Providien (1782); Battle of Negapatam (1782); Battle of Trincomalee (1782); Battle of Cuddalore (1783)
- Fate: Broken up, Chatham UK, October 1812

General characteristics
- Class & type: Intrepid-class ship of the line
- Tons burthen: 1372 bm
- Length: 159 ft 6 in (48.62 m) (gun deck)
- Beam: 44 ft 4 in (13.51 m)
- Draught: 10 ft 8 in (3.25 m)
- Depth of hold: 19 ft (5.8 m)
- Propulsion: Sails
- Sail plan: Full-rigged ship
- Armament: 64 guns: Gundeck: 26 × 24 pdrs; Upper gundeck: 26 × 18 pdrs; Quarterdeck: 10 × 4 pdrs; Forecastle: 2 × 9 pdrs

HMS Eagle was a British 64-gun third-rate ship of the line of the Royal Navy, launched on 2 May 1774 at Rotherhithe.

== History ==
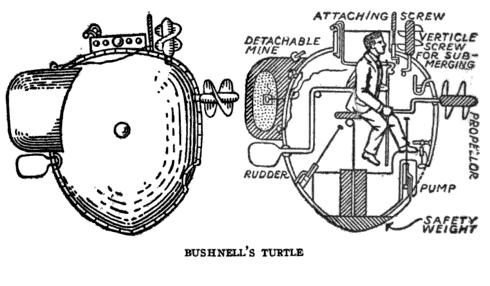
A diagram of American Turtle

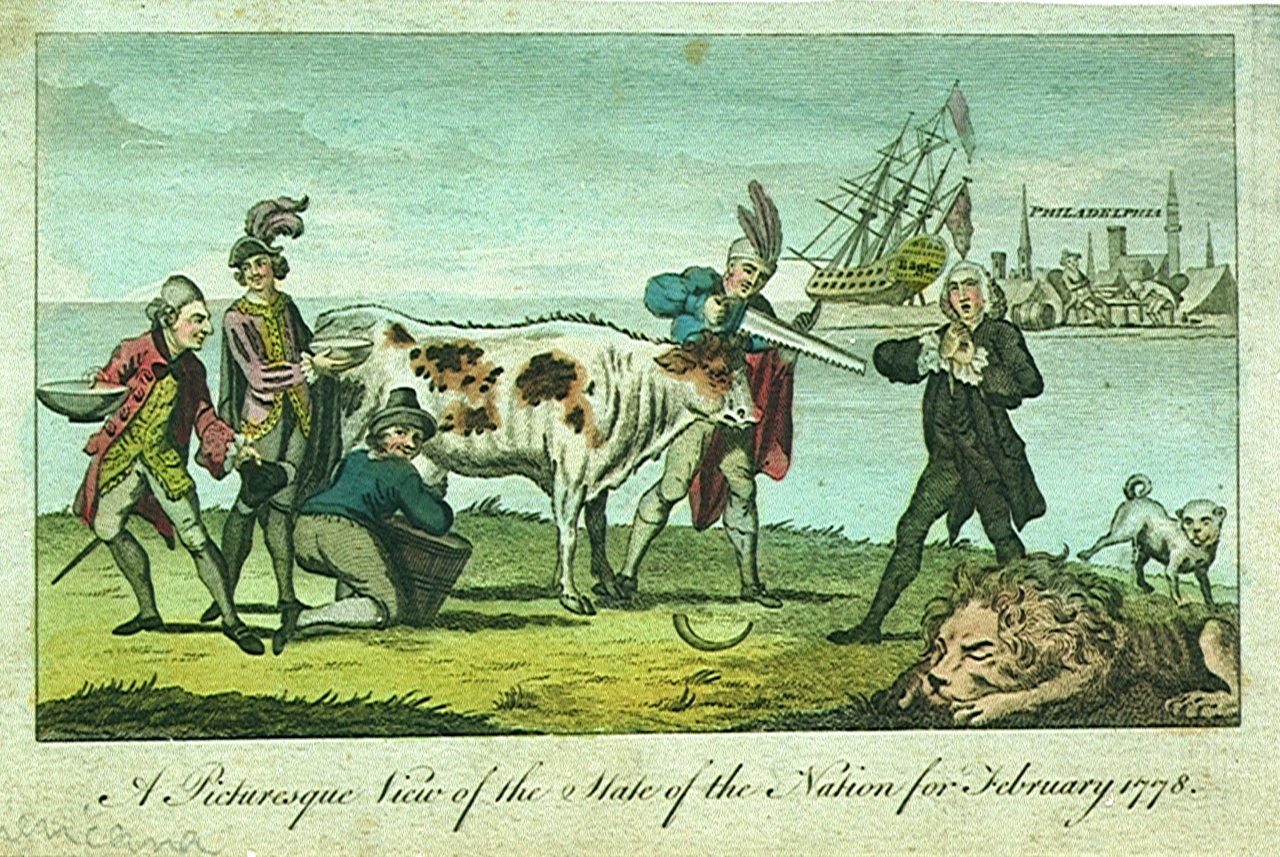
A cartoon showing Eagle in dry dock at Philadelphia, 1778. Admiral Howe is sitting at a table in the town, out of sight of his flagship, with his brother General Howe

On 7 September 1776, the experimental American submarine Turtle, under the guidance of army volunteer Sergeant Ezra Lee, was alleged to have attacked HMS Eagle, which was moored off what is today called Liberty Island, but was unable to bore through the hull. When Lee attempted another spot in the hull, he lost the ship, and eventually abandoned the attempt.

British naval historian Richard Compton-Hall stated that the problems of achieving neutral buoyancy would have rendered the vertical propeller useless. The route Turtle would have had to take to attack HMS Eagle was slightly across the tidal stream which would, in all probability, have resulted in Ezra Lee becoming exhausted having only 20 minutes of air. There is no record of the Royal Navy recording an attack. In the face of these and other problems Compton-Hall suggests that the Turtle got nowhere near HMS Eagle and the entire story was fabricated as disinformation and morale-boosting propaganda, and that if Ezra Lee did carry out an attack it was in a covered rowing boat rather than Turtle.

Eagle went on to take part in the Battle of Cuddalore in 1783.

Eagle was on harbour service from 1790, and was broken up in 1812.

== Notes ==
- Lavery, Brian (1983) The Ship of the Line – Volume 1: The development of the battlefleet 1650–1850. Conway Maritime Press. ISBN 0-85177-252-8.
- Winfield, Rif (2007). British Warships in the Age of Sail: 1714–1792. Seaforth Publishing. ISBN 9781844157006.
