= David Brown =

David or Dave Brown may refer to:

== People ==
=== Arts and entertainment ===
- Dave Brown (theatre director), Australian theatre maker of children's theatre, artistic director of Patch Theatre Company
- David Brown (British artist) (fl. 1792–1797), British painter
- David Robertson Brown (1869–1946), Canadian architect
- David Brown (American artist), American visual artist based in Old Saybrook, Connecticut, active since 2004
- Dave Brown (cartoonist) (born 1957), British cartoonist for The Independent in the UK
- David Brown (producer) (1916–2010), American movie producer
- Dave Brown (comedian) (born 1973), British actor and comedian
- David Brown (radio host), American lawyer, radio personality and journalist
- David Jay Brown (born 1961), American writer, interviewer, and consciousness researcher
- David W. Brown (born 1979), American author
- David Brown, American animator who serves as a main artist for the rhythm game Friday Night Funkin'
- David Brown, American actor and producer, played in Inside Man

=== Business ===
- David Brown (1734–1804), Scottish-Danish merchant and shipowner
- David Brown (entrepreneur) (1904–1993), British entrepreneur (David Brown & Sons, Aston Martin, Vosper Thorneycroft)

=== Music ===
- David Arthur Brown (born 1967), American vocalist and songwriter
- David Brown (American musician) (1947–2000), American musician, bass player with Santana, 1966–1976
- David Brown (Australian musician) (born 1956), Australian musician, active since 1978
- David Brown (British musician) (born 1987), better known as Boyinaband, YouTube personality and musician
- David Brown (double-bassist), American double-bassist with Rising Appalachia
- David Brown, American guitarist with Billy Joel
- David Brown, vocalist with Canadian band The New Cities
- David Darnell Brown (born 1981), birth name of Young Buck, American Southern rapper
- David Debrandon Brown (born 1985), singer/songwriter & American Idol season 4] semifinalist, a.k.a. pseudonym Lucky Daye

=== Politics and law ===
- David Brown (Canadian politician) (born 1990), Ottawa city councillor
- Dave Brown (Montana politician) (1948–1998), member of the Montana House of Representatives
- Dave Brown (Minnesota politician) (born 1961), member of the Minnesota Senate
- David Brown, mayor of Charlottesville, Virginia in 2004–2008
- David Brown (Massachusetts protester) (1740–1812), convicted of sedition because of his criticism of the US federal government
- David Brown (police officer) (born 1960), superintendent of the Chicago Police Department 2020–2023
- David Paul Brown, convicted kidnapper and child sexual assaulter, who changed his name to Nathaniel Bar-Jonah (1957–2008)

=== Religion ===
- David Brown (East India Company chaplain) (1762–1812), English chaplain in Bengal
- David Brown (Free Church of Scotland) (1803–1897), Scottish professor of theology at the University of Aberdeen
- David Brown (bishop) (David Allan Brown, 1922–1982), Bishop of Guildford 1973–1982
- David Brown (theologian) (David William Brown, born 1948), Scottish professor of theology, aesthetics, and culture, University of St. Andrews

=== Science ===
- David Alexander Brown (1916–2009), Australian geologist
- Dave Brown (meteorologist) (born 1946), American meteorologist at WMC-TV and former professional wrestling commentator
- David Brown (meteorologist) (born 1959), Australian meteorologist
- David R. Brown (neuroscientist) (born 1964), Australian-born research scientist
- David Brown (geneticist) (born 1968), American geneticist
- David J. Brown (computer scientist) (born 1957), American computer scientist
- David R. Brown (engineer) (1923–2016), American computer scientist
- David Brown (pharmacologist) (1936–2023), English professor of pharmacology
- David F. M. Brown, American physician

=== Sports ===
==== American football ====
- Dave Brown (cornerback) (1953–2006), NFL cornerback
- Dave Brown (quarterback) (born 1970), NFL quarterback for New York Giants and Arizona Cardinals, 1992–2001

==== Association football ====
- Davey Brown (1898–1970), American soccer player
- David Brown (footballer, born 1887) (1887–1970), Scottish striker for numerous clubs
- David Brown (footballer, born 1889) (1889–?), Scottish footballer who played for Tottenham Hotspur and Greenock Morton
- David Brown (footballer, born 1957), English footballer; see List of Bury F.C. players
- David Brown (footballer, born 1963), defender for Tranmere Rovers
- David Brown (footballer, born 1978), striker who plays for Wrexham Football Club
- David Brown (footballer, born 1989), striker who plays for Bradford Park Avenue
- David C. Brown, English footballer who played for Burnley in 1896–1897

==== Australian rules football ====
- David Brown (footballer, born 1946), Australian rules footballer for Geelong
- David Brown (footballer, born 1967), Australian rules footballer for Sydney Swans
- David Brown (footballer, born 1969), Australian rules footballer for Adelaide and Port Adelaide

==== Cricket ====
- David Brown (cricketer, born 1900) (1900–1951), Scottish cricketer
- David Brown (Scottish cricketer) (1941–2011), Scottish cricketer
- David J. Brown (cricketer) (born 1942), English Test cricketer
- David W. J. Brown (1942–2021), English cricketer
- David Owen Brown (born 1982), English cricketer

==== Ice hockey ====
- Dave Brown (ice hockey) (born 1962), NHL ice hockey right winger
- David Brown (ice hockey) (born 1985), Canadian ice hockey goaltender from Ontario

==== Rugby ====
- Dave Brown (rugby, born 1886), rugby league and rugby union player in Australia
- Dave Brown (rugby league, born 1913) (1913–1974), Australian rugby league footballer
- Dave Brown (rugby league, born 1940), Australian rugby league footballer of the 1960s
- Dave Brown (rugby league, born 1957), Australian rugby league footballer

==== Other sports ====
- Dave Brown (baseball) (1895–1985), Negro league baseball player
- Dave Brown (basketball) (1933–2009), former basketball coach
- David Brown (Canadian football) (born 1994), Canadian football offensive lineman
- David Brown (golfer) (1861–1936), Scottish golfer
- David Brown (rower, born 1928) (1928–2004), American rower and Olympic gold medalist
- David Brown (rugby union) (1908–1983), Scottish rugby union player
- David Brown (ski jumper) (born 1965), Canadian ski jumper
- David Edward Brown (1858–?), British rower
- David Brown (parathlete) (born 1992), American Paralympic champion
- Dave Brown (bowls) (1939–2007), Canadian lawn bowler

=== Other people ===
- David Brown (musicologist) (1929–2014), English musicologist, Tchaikovsky specialist
- David R. Brown (graphic designer), American graphic designer and academic administrator
- David S. Brown (born 1966), American historian
- David K. Brown (1928–2008), British naval architect, author, and historian
- David Tilden Brown (1823–1889), American psychiatrist
- David Brown (Royal Navy officer) (1927–2005), British admiral
- David M. Brown (1956–2003), American astronaut
- David Brown (Scottish Jew), the first Jew known to have lived in Edinburgh in 1691
- Nathaniel Bar-Jonah (1957–2008), born David Paul Brown, convicted kidnapper, child molester and cannibalistic serial killer
- David Brown (translator) (c. 1790–1829), Cherokee translator and clergyman
- David Brown, who was convicted of the murder of David Knapps

== Fictional characters ==
- David Brown (Emmerdale), a fictional character in the British soap opera Emmerdale

== Businesses ==
- David Brown Automotive (founded 2013), a British manufacturer of limited edition automobiles
  - David Brown Mini Remastered (2017–present), a city car produced by the British car manufacturer
  - David Brown Speedback (2014–present), a grand tourer produced by the British car manufacturer
- David Brown Ltd. (founded 1860), an English engineering company

== See also ==
- David Browne (disambiguation)
- David J. Brown (disambiguation)
