= David J. Brown =

David J. Brown may refer to:

- David J. Brown (cricketer) (born 1942), English Test cricketer
- David W. J. Brown (1942–2021), English cricketer
- David J. Brown, Sr. (born 1946), Australian footballer
- David J. Brown (computer scientist) (born 1957), American computer scientist
- David Jay Brown (born 1961), American writer, interviewer, and consciousness researcher

== See also ==
- David Brown (disambiguation)
