= Dr Brown =

Dr Brown, Doctor Brown or Doc Brown may refer to:

- Doc Brown (dancer), ragtime dancer, famous for "Doc Brown's Cakewalk"
- Doc Brown (rapper) (Ben Harvey Bailey Smith, born 1977), British rapper, comedian, actor, screenwriter and voiceover artist
- Emmett Brown, also known as "Doc Brown", a character in the Back to the Future series of films
- Dr. Brown's, a soft drink
- Doctor Brown, a song by J. T. Brown and Buster Brown, later covered by Fleetwood Mac on Mr. Wonderful
- Edwin J. Brown, also known as "Doc Brown", mayor of Seattle from 1922 to 1926
- Phil Burgers, a comedian and clown who performs under the name "Doctor Brown"

== Physicians and people with doctorates called Brown ==
- Alan A. Brown (1928–2010), American professor of Economics
- Ann Brown (1943–1999), educational psychologist
- David Brown (pharmacology professor), British professor of Pharmacology
- David Brown (geneticist) (born 1968), American scientist
- Dennis Brown (academic), American professor of Medicine
- Dorothy Lavinia Brown (1919–2004), first African-American female surgeon from the southeast United States
- Edward L. Brown (1805–1876), American physician and politician
- Emery N. Brown, American anesthesiologist
- Ernest William Brown (1866–1938), British mathematician
- George Williams Brown (1894–1963), Canadian historian and editor
- Gordon Brown (born 1951), former Labour Prime Minister of the United Kingdom
- Jason Walter Brown (born 1938), American neurologist
- John Brown (physician, born 1735) (1735–1788), Scottish physician
- John Brown (essayist) (1715–1766), English author
- John Brown (physician, born 1810) (1810–1882), Scottish physician and essayist
- John Ronald Brown (died 2010), famous for sex change surgeries
- John Seely Brown, organizational studies researcher
- Joseph Brown (artist) (1918–2009), Australian art collector; see Joseph Brown Collection
- Michael Brown (historian) (born 1965), Scottish medievalist
- Michael Glyn Brown (born 1957), former hand surgeon
- Michael L. Brown (born 1955), radio host, author, professor, theologian
- Morton Brown (born 1931), American mathematician
- Murray Brown (economist), Canadian professor of epidemiology
- Patrick O. Brown (born 1954), American professor of biochemistry and genomics
- Russell A. Brown, American physician and computer scientist
- Thomas Brown (philosopher) (1778–1820), Scottish metaphysician
