= VRHS =

VRHS may refer to:

- Valley Regional High School, Deep River, Connecticut
- Villa Rica High School, Villa Rica, Georgia
- Vista Ridge High School, Cedar Park, Texas
