= Old Saybrook High School =

Location
- 1111 Boston Post Road; Old Saybrook, Connecticut 06475; United States; 41°17′20″N 72°23′49″W

Information
- School type: Public, High school
- School district: Old Saybrook Public Schools
- Superintendent: Jan Perruccio
- CEEB code: 070605
- Principal: Joseph Anastasio
- Teaching staff: 39.10 (FTE)
- Grades: 9-12
- Enrollment: 345 (2023-2024)
- Student to teacher ratio: 8.82
- Colors: Blue and white
- Athletics conference: Shoreline Conference
- Mascot: Ram
- Accreditation: NEASC
- Newspaper: Rambler
- Website: oshs.oldsaybrookschools.org

Old Saybrook High School is a secondary school located in Old Saybrook, Connecticut, United States. It has a current enrollment of 444. with a student to teacher ratio of about 9.74. Old Saybrook students consistently exceed national and state averages on standardized tests. The school, its students and its teachers have won numerous awards in academics, the arts, athletics and other areas.

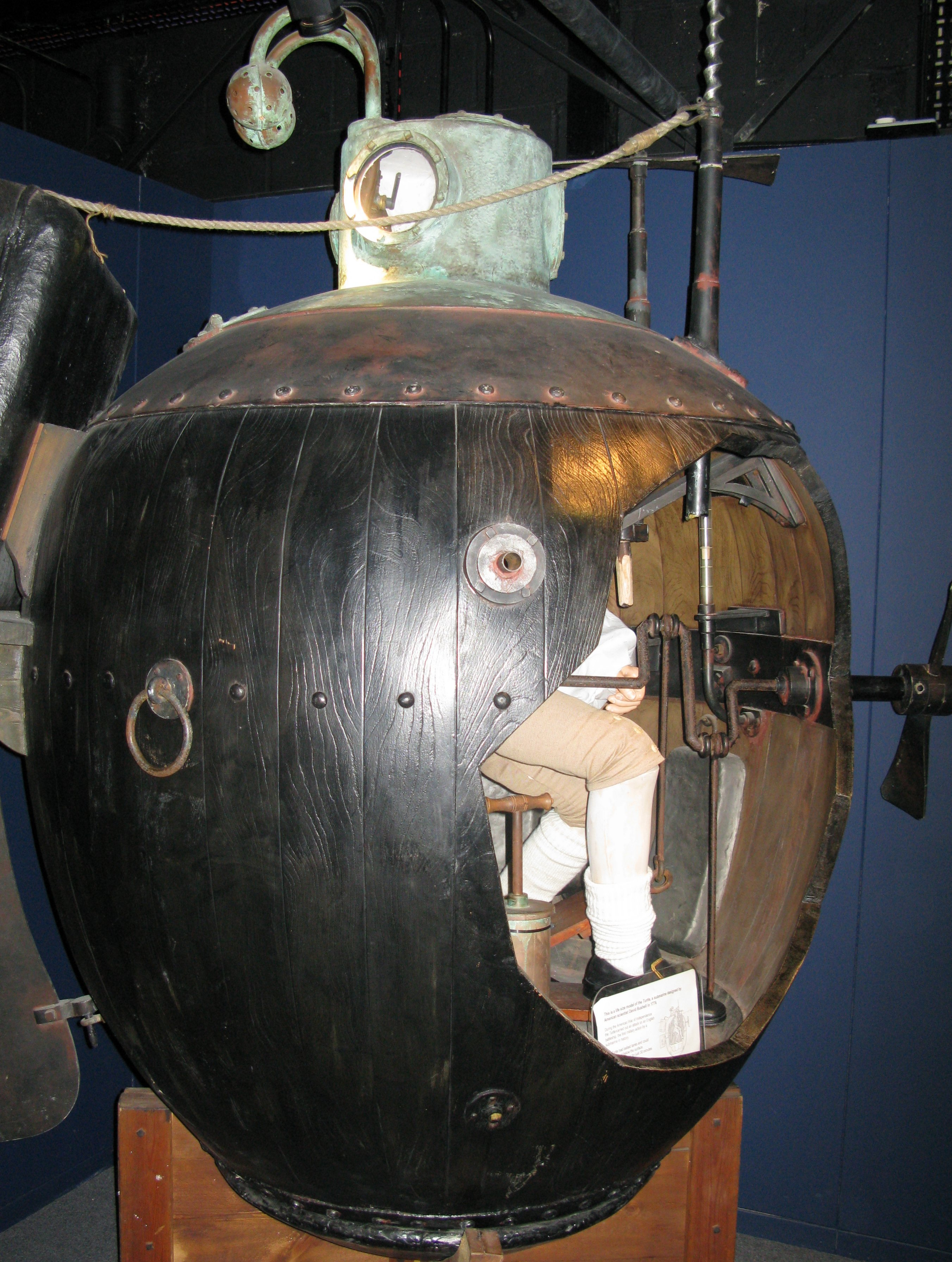
Turtle replica on display at the Royal Navy submarine museum

In 1976, a re-creation of the first submarine ever used in battle, the American Turtle, was designed by Joseph Leary and constructed by Fred Frese as a Bicentennial project. It was christened by Connecticut's governor, Ella Grasso, and later tested in the Connecticut River. It is owned by the Connecticut River Museum and is currently on loan to Old Saybrook Senior High School, where students under the direction of Fred Frese are currently building a working re-creation of that model.

Old Saybrook High School is also known for its athletics and art programs. The 2012 wrestling and 2005 boys' basketball teams won their respective state championships. Old Saybrook High School's track and field teams have had much success in the previous years, winning several conference tournaments.

== Athletics ==
Old Saybrook High School is a member of the Shoreline Conference as well as the CIAC. Old Saybrook High School currently offers the sports: soccer, field hockey, cross country, football (co-op with Westbrook High School), cheerleading, basketball, indoor track, swimming, outdoor track, lacrosse, crew, golf, softball, baseball, and tennis. It also hosts unified soccer and basketball teams.

== Notable alumni ==
- Vin Baker, 4-time NBA all-star
- David Brown, American artist
- Cassius Chaney, professional boxer and former NCAA basketball player for University of New Haven
- Anna Louise James, first female African American pharmacist in Connecticut
- Ann Petry, author of The Street
