= Murray Brown =

Murray Brown

- Murray Brown (cricketer) (born 1946), New Zealand cricketer
- Murray Brown (economist) (born 1936), Canadian economist
- Murray Brown (umpire) (born 1966), South African cricket umpire
