= General of the Army (United States) =

Rank in the United States Army

- Rank flag of a General of the Army

- Army service uniform shoulder strap with the rank of General of the Army
- Country: United States
- Service branch: United States Army
- Abbreviation: GA
- Rank group: General officer
- Rank: Five-star
- NATO rank code: OF-10
- Pay grade: Special grade
- Formation: 25 July 1866
- Next higher rank: General of the Armies
- Next lower rank: General
- Equivalent ranks: Fleet admiral (U.S. Navy); General of the Air Force (USAF)

General of the Army (abbreviated as GA) is a five-star general officer rank in the United States Army. It is generally equivalent to the rank of field marshal in other countries. In the United States, a General of the Army ranks above generals and is equivalent to a fleet admiral and a general of the Air Force. The General of the Army insignia consists of five 3/8-inch (9.5 mm) stars in a pentagonal pattern, with touching points. The insignia was initially paired with the gold and enameled United States coat of arms on service coat shoulder loops. The silver colored five-star chain insignia alone would be worn for use as a collar insignia of grade and on the garrison cap. Soft shoulder epaulets with five 7/16-inch (11 mm) stars in silver thread and gold-threaded United States coat of arms on green cloth were worn with shirts and sweaters.

The rank of "General of the Army" (the highest rank in the army) has had two incarnations. The first was introduced in 1866, following the American Civil War. While it was nominally a four-star rank, structurally it had authority over the entire Army; it was reserved for the Commanding General of the United States Army, and was held by three different men in succession from 1866 to 1888: Ulysses S. Grant, William Tecumseh Sherman and Philip Sheridan. When it was created by Congress for Grant, Grant had already reached the highest rank historically used in the United States, the three star lieutenant general. The "General of the Army" rank was revived during World War II as the modern five-star rank. The rank does not imply command of the entire Army and may be awarded to more than one officer at a time. It has been held by five different men since 1944, four promoted to the rank in December 1944 (George C. Marshall, Douglas MacArthur, Dwight D. Eisenhower, Henry H. Arnold), and one promoted in September 1950 (Omar Bradley).

The only higher rank is General of the Armies of the United States, which has only been conferred three times: to World War I's John J. Pershing in 1919, posthumously to George Washington in 1976, and posthumously to Ulysses S. Grant in 2024.

== History ==
=== Post–American Civil War era ===
General of the Army shoulder strap insignia, from 1866 to 1872.

General of the Army shoulder strap insignia, from 1872 to 1888.

Toward the end of the American Civil War, Ulysses S. Grant achieved the first fixed promotion to lieutenant general in the U.S. since George Washington. On 25 July 1866, the U.S. Congress further established the rank of "General of the Army of the United States" for General Grant. His pay was "four hundred dollars per month, and his allowance for fuel and quarters", except "when his headquarters are in Washington, shall be at the rate of three hundred dollars per month." (His combined monthly pay and allowance of seven hundred dollars in 1866 is equivalent to $15,000 in 2025). When appointed General of the Army, Grant wore the rank insignia of four stars and coat buttons arranged in three groups of four.

Unlike the World War II rank with a similar title, the 1866 rank of General of the Army was nominally a four-star rank, but this rank held all the authority and power of a 1799 proposal for a rank of "General of the Armies", even though Grant was never called by this title. Despite being titled General of the Army instead of General of the Armies, the Comptroller General of the United States would rule in 1924 that the grade revived in 1866 for Grant (and later William T. Sherman and Philip H. Sheridan) was the same grade that had been proposed for Washington in 1799 and revived for Pershing in 1919.

After Grant became U.S. president, he was succeeded as General of the Army by William T. Sherman, effective 4 March 1869. In 1872, Sherman ordered the insignia changed to two stars, with the coat of arms of the United States in between.

In contrast to the modern four-star rank of general, only one officer at a time could hold the 1866–1888 rank of General of the Army. For a few months in 1885, as he was dying, Grant was accorded a special honor and his rank was restored by Congressional legislation.

By an Act of Congress on 1 June 1888, the grade was conferred upon Philip Sheridan, who by then was in failing health. The rank of General of the Army ceased to exist with Sheridan's death on 5 August 1888.

==== Generals of the Army (post–Civil War) ====
Portrait	Name	Date of rank	Ref.
	Ulysses S. Grant (1822–1885)	25 July 1866	
	William T. Sherman (1820–1891)	4 March 1869	
	Philip Sheridan (1831–1888)	1 June 1888	

=== World War II and Korean War era ===
Although briefly considered, the U.S. Army did not introduce a rank by the name of field marshal. In the United States, the term "Marshal" has traditionally been used for civilian law enforcement officers, particularly the U.S. Marshals, as well as formerly for state and local police chiefs. In addition, giving the rank the name "marshal" would have resulted in George Marshall being designated "Field Marshal Marshall", which was considered undignified. The five-star rank and authority of General of the Army and equivalent naval Fleet Admiral were created by an Act of Congress on a temporary basis when Pub. L. 78–482 was passed on 14 December 1944, which provided only 75% of pay and allowances to the grade for those on the retired list. The rank was temporary, subject to reversion to permanent rank six months after the end of the war. The temporary rank was then declared permanent on 23 March 1946 by Pub. L. 79–333, which also awarded full pay and allowances in the grade to those on the retired list. It was created to give the most senior American commanders parity of rank with their British counterparts holding the ranks of field marshal and admiral of the fleet. This second General of the Army rank is not the same as the post-Civil War era version because of its purpose and five stars.

The insignia for the 1944 General of the Army rank consists of five stars in a pentagonal pattern, with points touching. The five officers who have held the 1944 version of General of the Army and the date of each's appointment are as follows:

==== Generals of the Army (WWII) ====
Portrait	Name	Position	Date of rank
	George C. Marshall (1880–1959)	US Army Chief of Staff	16 December 1944
	Douglas MacArthur (1880–1964)	Supreme Commander – Southwest Pacific Area	18 December 1944
	Dwight D. Eisenhower (1890–1969)	Supreme Commander – Europe	20 December 1944
	Henry H. Arnold (1886–1950)	Commander of the US Army Air Forces	21 December 1944
	Omar Bradley (1893–1981)	Chairman of the Joint Chiefs of Staff; Chairman of the NATO Military Committee	22 September 1950

The timing of the first four of these appointments was coordinated with the first three of the following appointments of the U.S. Navy's first five-star Fleet Admirals:

•	William D. Leahy	15 December 1944
•	Ernest King	17 December 1944
•	Chester W. Nimitz	19 December 1944
•	William Halsey Jr.	11 December 1945

This was to establish both an order of seniority among the generals and a near-equivalence between the services.

Eisenhower resigned his Army commission on 31 May 1952 to run for the U.S. presidency. After Eisenhower was elected and served two terms, President John F. Kennedy on 22 March 1961 signed Pub. L. 87–3, which authorized reappointing Eisenhower "to the active list of the Regular Army in his former grade, of General of the Army with his former date of rank in such grade". This rank is today commemorated on the signs denoting Interstate Highways as part of the Eisenhower Interstate System, which display five silver stars on a light blue background.

Arnold, a general in the Army, was the Commanding General of the Army Air Forces throughout World War II, when he was promoted. After his United States Air Force became a separate service on 18 September 1947, Arnold's rank was carried over to the Air Force, just as all Army Air Forces airmen's rank carried over. Arnold was the first and, to date, only General of the Air Force. He is also the only person to have ever held a five-star rank in two branches of the U.S. Armed Forces.

Bradley received the 5-star rank upon being made the first Chairman of the Joint Chiefs of Staff (serving from 1949 to 1953). This was to make him equal in rank to General of the Army MacArthur, who was still serving at the time.

These officers who held the rank of General of the Army remained officers of the United States Army for life, with an annual $20,000 in pay and allowances, equivalent to $366,000 in 2025. They were entitled to an office maintained by the Army along with an aide (of the rank of colonel), a secretary, and an orderly.

=== Modern usage ===
Rank insignia for a General of the Army if worn on the Army Blue service uniform, from 2010 to present.

Rank insignia for a General of the Army if it is worn on the Army Green Class "A" service uniform, from September 1959 to October 2015.

No officers have been promoted to the rank of General of the Army since Omar Bradley (who was also the last living officer of such rank when he died in 1981). The rank is still maintained in the Army's structure, and could be awarded by the president with the consent of the United States Senate.

Although the first Chairman of the Joint Chiefs of Staff (CJCS), Omar Bradley, was eventually awarded a fifth star, such a promotion does not come with that office; Bradley's elevation ensured that he would not be outranked by his subordinate, Douglas MacArthur.

In the 1990s, there were proposals in Department of Defense academic circles to bestow a five-star rank on the office of the Chairman of the Joint Chiefs of Staff.

After the conclusion of the Persian Gulf War, but before his tenure as Secretary of State, there was talk of awarding a fifth star to General Colin Powell, who had served as CJCS during the conflict. But even in the face of public and Congressional pressure to do so, Clinton presidential transition team staffers decided against it for strongly political reasons, fearing that a fifth star might have assisted Powell (a Republican) had he decided to run for office. An effort was also made to promote General Norman Schwarzkopf Jr. to General of the Army, although it was not carried out.

As recently as the late 2000s, some commentators proposed that the military leader in the Global War on Terrorism be promoted to a five-star rank. In January 2011, the founders of the Vets for Freedom political advocacy group published an op-ed in The Wall Street Journal calling for David Petraeus to be awarded a fifth star in recognition of his work and the importance of his mission. Earlier, in July 2010, David W. Brown wrote an article in The Atlantic supporting the same promotion.

== Ranks senior to General of the Army ==
The rank of General of the Armies of the United States is senior to General of the Army and has been bestowed on only three officers in U.S. history. In 1919, John J. Pershing was promoted to General of the Armies for his services in World War I. In 1944, when Congress authorized the creation of the five-star grade of General of the Army, a provision was added to the law doing so that stated, "Nothing in this Act shall affect the provisions of the Act of September 3, 1919 (41 Stat. 283: 10 U.S.C. 671a), or any other law relating to the office of General of the Armies of the United States."

In 1976, during the United States Bicentennial, Congress conferred a posthumous promotion upon George Washington to the rank of General of the Armies. With the bicentennial approaching, Congress passed legislation urging Washington's promotion, for his service as the first commanding general of the United States Army, on 19 January 1976. President Gerald Ford approved the promotion in October 1976, but historians found that congressional and presidential actions were not enough and that the Army had to issue official orders to make the promotion official. The promotion was conferred by Secretary of the Army Clifford Alexander on 13 March 1978, with an effective date of 4 July 1976. According to Public Law 94-479, Washington is established as having "rank and precedence over all other grades of the Army, past or present." Thus, Washington will always be the most senior general of the United States Army.

In 2024, victorious Civil War general Ulysses S. Grant was posthumously promoted to the rank of General of the Armies to celebrate 200 years since his birth. Congress authorized the promotion as part of the 2023 National Defense Authorization Act, which was signed into law on 23 December 2022. The promotion was officially conferred on 19 April 2024 with the same rank and precedence as Pershing, upholding the standard that Washington would permanently remain the US Army’s highest-ranking officer.

In 1903, retroactive to 1899, the "Hero of Manila", Admiral George Dewey, was promoted to Admiral of the Navy, a rank equivalent to that of a five-star admiral. The promotion of Admiral Dewey is the only time an Admiral of the Navy has been named and the rank ceased to exist after his death.

== See also ==
- General officers in the United States
- List of comparative military ranks
- List of field marshals
- List of United States military leaders by rank
- Six-star rank
- Supreme Allied Commander
- United States Army officer rank insignia
