= North Branford High School =

Location
- 49 Caputo Road; North Branford, Connecticut 06471; United States
- Coordinates: 41°20′10″N 72°48′05″W

Information
- Type: Public
- Superintendent: Scott Schoonmaker
- CEEB code: 070563
- Principal: Todd Stoeffler
- Teaching staff: 48.40 (FTE)
- Enrollment: 432 (2024-2025)
- Student to teacher ratio: 8.93
- Colors: Purple and White
- Athletics conference: Shoreline Conference
- Mascot: Thunderbird
- Website: nbhs.northbranfordschools.org

North Branford High School is a public high school in North Branford, Connecticut. In 2010, North Branford High School had 12 students for every full-time equivalent teacher. It is the only high school in the town of North Branford, which accounts for residents in both North Branford and Northford. The school has around 700 students annually and graduates over 90% of its students.

== Administration ==
In 2006, the administration was accused of grade tampering in order to boost graduation rates. Following an investigation, the state's Attorney General office concluded that no widespread tampering took place.
