= Vin Baker =

American basketball player and coach (born 1971)

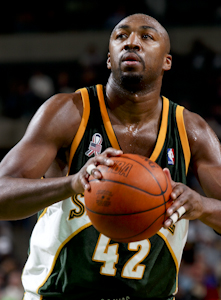
- Baker with the Seattle SuperSonics in 2001

Miami Heat
- Title: Assistant coach
- League: NBA

Personal information
- Born: November 23, 1971 (age 54) Lake Wales, Florida, U.S.
- Listed height: 6 ft 11 in (2.11 m)
- Listed weight: 240 lb (109 kg)

Career information
- High school: Old Saybrook (Old Saybrook, Connecticut)
- College: Hartford (1989–1993)
- NBA draft: 1993: 1st round, 8th overall pick
- Drafted by: Milwaukee Bucks
- Playing career: 1993–2006
- Position: Power forward / center
- Number: 42, 34
- Coaching career: 2018–present

Career history

Playing
- 1993–1997: Milwaukee Bucks
- 1997–2002: Seattle SuperSonics
- 2002–2004: Boston Celtics
- 2004–2005: New York Knicks
- 2005: Houston Rockets
- 2006: Los Angeles Clippers

Coaching
- 2018–2026: Milwaukee Bucks (assistant)
- 2026–present: Miami Heat (assistant)

Career highlights
- As a player: 4× NBA All-Star (1995–1998); All-NBA Second Team (1998); All-NBA Third Team (1997); NBA All-Rookie First Team (1994); America East Player of the Year (1993); 3× First-team All-America East (1991–1993); No. 42 jersey retired by Hartford Hawks; As assistant coach: NBA champion (2021); NBA Cup champion (2024)

Career NBA statistics
- Points: 11,839 (15.0 ppg)
- Rebounds: 5,867 (7.4 rpg)
- Assists: 1,509 (1.9 apg)
- Stats at NBA.com
- Stats at Basketball Reference
Medals
Men's basketball
Representing United States
Olympic Games
Gold medal – first place	2000 Sydney	Team competition
FIBA Americas Championship
Gold medal – first place	1999 San Juan	Team competition

Vincent Lamont Baker (born November 23, 1971) is an American former professional basketball player who played in the National Basketball Association (NBA). He appeared in four consecutive All-Star Games. He currently serves as an assistant coach for the Miami Heat.

== Early life ==
Baker played for Old Saybrook High School in Old Saybrook, Connecticut. He first started on Old Saybrook's varsity in his junior year. Baker was passed over by the bigger Division I schools and signed a scholarship offer from the Hartford Hawks.

== College career ==
During Baker's inaugural season in 1989, he averaged 4.7 points and 2.9 rebounds per game, which earned him a place on the North Atlantic Conference (now America East Conference) All-Rookie Team. Named a starter for his sophomore season, Baker averaged 19.7 PPG and 10.4 RPG and a first team All-NAC spot. As a Junior, Baker averaged 27.6 PPG (2nd in the country), 9.9 RPG, and 3.7 blocks per game (5th in the country), though the team finished with an abysmal 6–21 record. Entering his final season, Baker was called "America's Best-Kept Secret" by Sports Illustrated and the conference's most dominant player since Reggie Lewis by Street & Smith's College/Prep Basketball Preview in 1992. Baker averaged 28.3 PPG (4th in the country) and finished with 792 points in only 28 games, a conference record that still remains in the NAC. He finished with 2,238 points, a school record that still stands. However, Baker was not able to translate his immense scoring abilities into team success, as none of his teams ever made the NCAA tournament, and the best his Hartford teams ever finished in a season was .500 (14–14).

Baker's jersey (#42) hangs on the east wall of Chase Arena in the Reich Family Pavilion.

== Professional career ==
=== Milwaukee Bucks (1993–1997) ===
After a college career at the University of Hartford, Baker was selected by the Milwaukee Bucks with the 8th pick of the 1993 NBA draft. He played four seasons in Milwaukee, during which he was the leading star (alongside Glenn Robinson) and received three all-star selections.

On March 14, 1995, Baker recorded a triple double, with 12 points, 12 rebounds, and 12 assists, in a win against the Charlotte Hornets. On April 11, 1995, Baker scored 31 points, grabbed 12 rebounds, and recorded 9 assists in a 114–100 victory over the Detroit Pistons.

During the 1995–96 and 1996–97 seasons, Baker averaged at least 21.0 points.

On March 1, 1997, Baker recorded a career-high 6 blocks, alongside 20 points and 15 rebounds, in a 103–92 loss against the Sacramento Kings.

Despite his personal success as a player while in Milwaukee, the Bucks were not able to make the postseason during his tenure with the team.

=== Seattle SuperSonics (1997–2002) ===
After four seasons with the Bucks, he was traded to the Seattle SuperSonics following the 1996–97 NBA season in a three-team deal that sent Tyrone Hill and Terrell Brandon to the Bucks, and Shawn Kemp and Sherman Douglas to the Cleveland Cavaliers.

Baker helped the SuperSonics to a strong 1997-98 NBA season and a first round win over the Minnesota Timberwolves, while proving to be a valuable replacement for Kemp. On May 12, 1998, in a decisive Game 5 of a hard-fought Western Conference Semifinals against the Los Angeles Lakers (both teams finished the season with a 61–21 record, though Seattle had home-court advantage due to a tiebreaker), Baker led Seattle with 29 points and 9 rebounds in a losing effort.

On February 1, 2000, Baker scored 33 points, recorded 5 assists, and 5 rebounds, in a 104–96 victory against Karl Malone and the Jazz.

=== Boston Celtics (2002–2004) ===
After four years in Seattle, Baker was traded to the Boston Celtics with Shammond Williams for Kenny Anderson, Vitaly Potapenko and Joseph Forte. While his career averages include 15.1 points per game, his numbers had dropped considerably in the twenty-first century. After the 1998–99 NBA lockout season in Seattle, Baker's weight ballooned to near 300 pounds and his game suffered tremendously. While Baker was able to get his weight down to around 250, Baker revealed that he was a recovering alcoholic who used to binge in hotel rooms and at home after playing poorly. In an interview with the Boston Globe, Baker said Celtics coach Jim O'Brien smelled alcohol on him in practice and confronted him about it. The team suspended him and he was eventually released.

=== New York Knicks (2004–2005) ===
Baker would sign with the New York Knicks. The team reached the playoffs in the 2003–04 NBA season.

=== Houston Rockets (2005) ===
Baker was traded to the Rockets with Moochie Norris for Maurice Taylor on February 24, 2005.

=== Los Angeles Clippers (2006) ===
The Rockets would ultimately release Baker on October 7, 2005. He would spend the 2005–06 NBA season in a reserve role with the Los Angeles Clippers.

Baker signed with the Minnesota Timberwolves on October 1, 2006, reuniting him with head coach Dwane Casey, who served as an assistant coach when Baker was in Seattle. His tenure in Minnesota would be short-lived, though. Baker was released from the Timberwolves on November 13, 2006. He never played in a regular season game after being on the inactive list for the first six games.

== Career statistics ==
Legend
GP	Games played	GS	Games started	MPG	Minutes per game
FG%	Field goal percentage	3P%	3-point field goal percentage	FT%	Free throw percentage
RPG	Rebounds per game	APG	Assists per game	SPG	Steals per game
BPG	Blocks per game	PPG	Points per game	**Bold**	Career high
*	Led the league

=== College ===
Year	Team	GP	GS	MPG	FG%	3P%	FT%	RPG	APG	SPG	BPG	PPG
1989–90	Hartford	28	2	13.4	**.617**	–	.390	2.9	.3	.3	1.7	4.7
1990–91	Hartford	**29**	**29**	31.0	.491	–	**.678**	10.4	.6	1.1	2.0	19.6
1991–92	Hartford	27	27	**36.9**	.440	**.331**	.657	9.9	1.3	1.3	**3.7**	27.6
1992–93	Hartford	28	28	36.4	.477	.269	.625	**10.7**	**1.9**	**1.4**	2.6	**28.3**
Career		112	86	29.4	.475	.300	.637	8.5	1.0	1.0	2.5	20.0

=== NBA ===
==== Regular season ====
Year	Team	GP	GS	MPG	FG%	3P%	FT%	RPG	APG	SPG	BPG	PPG
1993–94	Milwaukee	**82***	63	31.2	.501	.200	.569	7.6	2.0	.7	**1.4**	13.5
1994–95	Milwaukee	**82***	**82***	**41.0***	.483	.292	.593	**10.3**	**3.6**	1.0	**1.4**	17.7
1995–96	Milwaukee	**82**	**82***	40.5	.489	.208	.670	9.9	2.6	.8	1.1	**21.1**
1996–97	Milwaukee	78	78	40.5	.505	.278	.687	**10.3**	2.7	1.0	**1.4**	21.0
1997–98	Seattle	**82***	**82***	35.9	**.542**	.143	.591	8.0	1.9	**1.1**	1.0	19.2
1998–99	Seattle	34	31	34.2	.453	.000	.450	6.2	1.6	.9	1.0	13.8
1999–2000	Seattle	79	75	36.1	.455	.250	.682	7.7	1.9	.6	.8	16.6
2000–01	Seattle	76	27	28.0	.422	.063	.723	5.7	1.2	.5	1.0	12.2
2001–02	Seattle	55	41	31.1	.485	.125	.633	6.4	1.3	.4	.7	14.1
2002–03	Boston	52	9	18.1	.478	.000	.673	3.8	.6	.4	.6	5.2
2003–04	Boston	37	33	27.0	.505	.000	.732	5.7	1.5	.6	.6	11.3
2003–04	New York	17	0	18.4	.404	**.500**	.711	4.1	.7	.4	.5	6.6
2004–05	New York	24	0	8.0	.342	.000	.467	1.5	.4	.1	.2	1.4
2004–05	Houston	3	0	4.3	.000	—	**1.000**	.7	.3	.0	.0	.7
2005–06	L.A. Clippers	8	1	10.6	.467	—	.722	2.4	.5	.5	.5	3.4
Career		791	604	32.5	.485	.215	.638	7.4	1.9	.7	1.0	15.0
All-Star		4	0	17.5	.419	.000	.750	6.0	.7	.5	.2	8.7

==== Playoffs ====
Year	Team	GP	GS	MPG	FG%	3P%	FT%	RPG	APG	SPG	BPG	PPG
1998	Seattle	**10**	**10**	**37.1**	.530	—	.421	**9.4**	1.8	**1.8**	**1.5**	**15.8**
2000	Seattle	5	4	35.4	.400	.000	.588	7.6	**2.0**	1.0	.4	14.0
2002	Seattle	5	4	28.8	.500	**1.000**	**.778**	5.0	.8	.6	1.2	13.2
2004	New York	4	0	14.3	**.571**	—	.667	3.0	.3	.8	.5	5.5
Career		24	18	31.2	.491	.500	.534	7.0	1.4	1.2	1.0	13.2

== Post-playing career ==
Baker has a non-profit foundation called the Stand Tall Foundation. The Stand Tall Foundation is an organization that helps give kids a better future by financially assisting with different charitable and volunteer organizations. The goal of the Stand Tall Foundation is to help young people with their education, personal development and general well-being.

On June 3, 2011, Baker was hired as an assistant high school boys basketball coach at St. Bernard School in Uncasville, Connecticut.

In 2014, Baker was named to a team assembled by Dennis Rodman as part of his "basketball diplomacy" effort in North Korea; the team was assembled to play an exhibition game against the North Korean Senior National Team to celebrate the birthday of Kim Jong-un.

As of December 2015, Baker was managing a Starbucks location in Old Lyme, Connecticut. Baker later became Fox Sports Milwaukee's home team broadcaster.

In 2017, Baker became the head of the basketball department at Camp Greylock.

On July 18, 2020, The Vin Baker Foundation hosted a 5k run called "Addiction Ends Here".

== Coaching career ==
Since 2018, Baker has been serving as an assistant coach for the Milwaukee Bucks, helping them win a championship in 2021.

After eight seasons with the Bucks organization, Baker joined the coaching staff of the Miami Heat on August 21, 2026, under head coach Erik Spoelstra.

== Personal life ==
Baker's mother is Jean Baker. His father, Rev. James Baker, is an auto mechanic and Baptist minister. Baker has a wife and four children.

On June 19, 2007, Baker was arrested in Norwich, Connecticut for drunk driving after leaving Foxwoods Resort Casino.

On June 21, 2008 ml-implode.com reported that Baker's 10,000 sq ft (930 m^{2}) Durham, Connecticut home was foreclosed and put up for sale for $2.3 million. The house was purchased by U.S. Bank for $2.5 million at an auction on June 28, 2008. Baker reportedly lost over $100 million due to financial troubles.

Baker has struggled with depression and alcoholism. Baker cites these issues as the main reason his career seemingly derailed out of nowhere. In 2013, the New York Daily News reported that he had stopped drinking alcohol on April 17, 2011.

== See also ==
- List of National Basketball Association annual minutes leaders
