= Red Planet Noir =

2009 novel by D. B. Grady

- Cover of first edition (soft cover)
- Author: D. B. Grady
- Language: English
- Genre: science fiction or crime fiction
- Publisher: Brown Street Press, Lexington
- Publication date: 2009 (Softcover)
- Publication place: United States of America
- Media type: Print (paperback)
- Pages: 215
- ISBN: 978-0-9641674-3-8

Red Planet Noir is a combination work of crime fiction and science fiction written by American author David W. Brown under the pseudonym D. B. Grady. The story begins in New Orleans with a broke private detective. The main character, Michael Sheppard, goes to Mars after his wife leaves him. A bombshell heiress hires him to check out the murder of her father on the red planet. In the beginning, the goal was just for the money, but Sheppard soon finds himself in the middle of a conspiracy that includes various figures in power. Three groups: the mob, labor union, and military, are all trying to gain control of the planet Mars.

== Awards ==
- 2010 – Next Generation Indie Book Award for science fiction (winner)
