= David Browne =

David Browne may refer to:

- David Browne (journalist) (born 1960), American journalist and author
- David Browne (cricketer) (born 1964), English cricketer
- David Browne (footballer) (born 1995), Papua New Guinean footballer
- David Browne (politician), Ulster Unionist politician
- Dave Browne (voice actor)
- Dave J. Browne, British game designer
- Michael Browne (cardinal) (1887–1971), Irish prelate, born David Browne

== See also ==
- David Brown (disambiguation)
