= Shoreline Conference =

- Conference: CIAC
- No. of teams: 12
- Region: Middlesex County

Shoreline Conference is one of the many athletic conferences in Connecticut. The conference consists mostly of schools in Middlesex County and serves one school in New Haven County and another in New London County. It is a member of the CIAC.

== List of member high schools ==
School	Location	Nickname	Colors
Coginchaug Regional High School	Durham, Connecticut	Blue Devils	
Cromwell High School	Cromwell, Connecticut	Panthers	
East Hampton High School	East Hampton, Connecticut	Bell Ringers	
Haddam-Killingworth High School	Higganum, Connecticut	Cougars	
The Morgan School	Clinton, Connecticut	Huskies	
Nathan Hale-Ray High School	East Haddam, Connecticut	Noises	
North Branford High School	North Branford, Connecticut	Thunderbirds	
Lyme-Old Lyme High School	Old Lyme, Connecticut	Wildcats	
Old Saybrook High School	Old Saybrook, Connecticut	Rams	
Portland High School	Portland, Connecticut	Highlanders	
Valley Regional High School	Deep River, Connecticut	Warriors	
Westbrook High School	Westbrook, Connecticut	Knights	

== Sports ==
Fall

- Volleyball
- Field Hockey
- Soccer
- Cross Country
- Swimming (girls)
- (There is no shoreline league for football)

Winter

- Swimming (boys)
- Basketball
- Cheerleading
- Indoor Track
- Gymnastics
- Wrestling

Spring

- Lacrosse
- Tennis
- Baseball
- Softball
- Outdoor Track and Field
- Golf
