= Cassius Chaney =

American boxer (born 1987)

Personal information
- Nickname: C.O.G.
- Born: June 7, 1987 (age 39) Baltimore, Maryland, U.S.
- Height: 6 ft 6 in (198 cm)
- Weight: Heavyweight

Boxing career
- Reach: 81 in (206 cm)
- Stance: Orthodox

Boxing record
- Total fights: 30
- Wins: 26
- Win by KO: 19
- Losses: 4

Cassius Chaney (born June 7, 1987) is an American professional boxer who held the WBC-USNBC Silver heavyweight title from 2019 to 2021. He holds the New England Heavyweight Championship since September 2026.

== Education ==
Chaney attended Old Saybrook Senior High School where he was a star basketball player. Chaney was twice named all-state, leading the team to a state championship in 2005. He then went on to play basketball at University of New Haven.

== Professional career ==
Chaney made his professional debut on April 17, 2015, scoring a second-round technical knockout (TKO) over Perry Filkins at the Mohegan Sun Casino in Uncasville, Connecticut.

After compiling a record of 17–0 (11 KOs), he defeated Nick Jones via third-round knockout (KO) to capture the WBC-USNBC Silver heavyweight title on November 27, 2019, at the Castleton Banquet & Conference Center in Windham, New Hampshire.

== Professional boxing record ==
29 fights	25 wins	4 losses
By knockout	18	1
By decision	7	3

No.	Result	Record	Opponent	Type	Round, time	Date	Location	Notes
30	Win	26-4	Steve Vukosa	KO	5 (8), 2:59	Sep 12, 2026	Chevalier Theatre, Medford, Massachusetts, U.S.	Won New England Heavyweight title
29	Win	25-4	Harold Roy	TKO	3 (6), 1:54	June 6, 2026	Fenway Park, Boston, Massachusetts, U.S.	
28	Loss	24-4	Alexander Flores	RTD	7 (10), 3:00	Jan 30, 2026	Thunder Studios, Long Beach, California, U.S.	
27	Win	24-3	Quincy Palmer	TKO	1 (6), 0:35	Oct 17, 2025	Embassy Suites Conference Center, Olathe, Kansas, U.S.	
26	Loss	23-3	Junior Anthony Wright	UD	10	Mar 22, 2025	Royale Nightclub, Boston, Massachusetts, U.S.	
25	Loss	23–2	Michael Hunter	UD	10	Jun 7, 2024	Seminole Hard Rock Hotel and Casino, Hollywood, Florida, U.S.	For vacant WBA gold heavyweight title
24	Win	23–1	Trevor Bryan	KO	7 (10), 2:03	Nov 4, 2023	Casino Miami, Miami, Florida, U.S.	
23	Win	22–1	Mathew McKinney	TKO	1 (8), 2:07	Aug 20, 2021	Mohegan Sun Casino, Uncasville, Connecticut, U.S.	
22	Loss	21–1	George Arias	SD	10	Dec 2, 2021	Hammerstein Ballroom, New York City, New York, U.S.	Not to be confused with George Arias
21	Win	21–0	Shawndell Winters	UD	10	Aug 14, 2021	The Palladium, Worcester, Massachusetts, U.S.	
20	Win	20–0	Jason Bergman	TKO	3 (8), 2:23	Dec 12, 2020	Champion Boxing Gym, Jonesboro, Georgia, U.S.	
19	Win	19–0	Chauncy Welliver	TKO	4 (8), 2:01	Aug 28, 2020	Osceola Heritage Park, Kissimmee, Florida, U.S.	
18	Win	18–0	Nick Jones	KO	3 (8), 1:22	Nov 27, 2019	Castleton Banquet & Conference Center, Windham, New Hampshire, U.S.	Won vacant WBC-USNBC Silver heavyweight title
17	Win	17–0	Santander Silgado	KO	1 (8), 1:03	Oct 11, 2019	Connecticut Convention Center, Hartford, Connecticut, U.S.	
16	Win	16–0	Joel Caudle	TKO	1 (8), 1:52	Jul 19, 2019	MGM National Harbor, Oxon Hill, Maryland, U.S.	
15	Win	15–0	Christian Mariscal	TKO	1 (6), 2:16	Mar 30, 2019	2300 Arena, Philadelphia, Pennsylvania, U.S.	
14	Win	14–0	Santino Turnbow	KO	4 (6), 1:04	Nov 3, 2018	Aviator Sports and Events Center, New York City, New York, U.S.	
13	Win	13–0	Elder Hernandez	TKO	1 (6), 2:46	Jun 30, 2018	Mohegan Sun Arena, Montville, Connecticut, U.S.	
12	Win	12–0	Tim Washington	KO	2 (6), 1:28	Mar 3, 2018	Hulu Theater, New York City, New York, U.S.	
11	Win	11–0	Jon Bolden	UD	6	Oct 5, 2017	Mohegan Sun Arena, Montville, Connecticut, U.S.	
10	Win	10–0	Juan Goode	UD	6	Apr 15, 2017	Mohegan Sun Arena, Montville, Connecticut, U.S.	
9	Win	9–0	Tommy Washington Jr.	MD	6	Mar 10, 2017	2300 Arena, Philadelphia, Pennsylvania, U.S.	
8	Win	8–0	Carlos Sandoval	RTD	2 (4), 3:00	Nov 26, 2016	Mohegan Sun Arena, Montville, Connecticut, U.S.	
7	Win	7–0	Raymond Lopez	UD	4	Jun 3, 2016	2300 Arena, Philadelphia, Pennsylvania, U.S.	
6	Win	6–0	Zoltan Csala	TKO	3 (4), 2:52	Jan 30, 2016	Bell Centre, Montreal, Canada	
5	Win	5–0	Larry Olubamiwo	PTS	4	Nov 14, 2015	City Academy Sports Centre, Bristol, England	
4	Win	4–0	Alando Pugh	TKO	1 (4), 1:21	Sep 18, 2015	Twin River Event Center, Lincoln, Rhode Island, U.S.	
3	Win	3–0	Edward Ramirez	KO	1 (4), 1:55	Jul 25, 2015	Mandalay Bay Events Center, Las Vegas, Nevada, U.S.	
2	Win	2–0	Ruben Ortiz	UD	4	May 30, 2015	Danbury Arena, Danbury, Connecticut, U.S.	
1	Win	1–0	Perry Filkins	TKO	2 (4), 0:31	Apr 17, 2015	Mohegan Sun Arena, Montville, Connecticut, U.S.	
