= Lyme-Old Lyme High School =

Location
- 69 Lyme Street; Old Lyme, Connecticut 06371; United States; 41°19′07″N 72°19′30″W

Information
- School type: Public, High school
- School district: Lyme-Old Lyme Public Schools
- CEEB code: 070600
- Principal: James Wygonik
- Teaching staff: 40.80 (FTE)
- Grades: 9-12
- Enrollment: 392 (2023-2024)
- Student to teacher ratio: 9.61
- Hours in school day: 6
- Colors: Blue and white
- Athletics conference: Shoreline Conference
- Team name: Wildcats
- Newspaper: The Osprey
- Yearbook: Lymen
- Feeder schools: Lyme-Old Lyme Middle School
- Website: lolhs.region18.org

Lyme-Old Lyme High School is a public high school in Old Lyme, Connecticut. It serves grades 9 through 12 and is the only high school operated by Lyme-Old Lyme Schools. The school has a wide range of award-winning groups and athletics programs, including at least 38 clubs. Several clubs including the robotics team and mock trial team compete nationally. In addition, the school ranks number 8 in Connecticut for academics according to U.S. News & World Report, with 67% of student taking one or more APs during their high school career as of 2025.

== History ==
A successful 2009 referendum cleared the way for a 15,000-square foot expansion of the school that wrapped up in 2013.

== Athletics ==
LOLHS athletic teams are nicknamed the Wildcats and compete in the Shoreline Conference. The school fields a co-op football team with Valley Regional High School, nicknamed the Warriors.

State Championships
Sports (Girls)	Years
Girls Soccer	2009, 2015, 2016, 2017, 2018
Girls Basketball	1997, 2009
Girls Gymnastics	2006
Girls Tennis	2021, 2022, 2023
Girls Track/Field	2024, 2025
Girls Cross Country Class S	2026

State Championships
Sports (Boys)	Years
Boys Soccer	1969
Boys Basketball	2024
Boys Football (class s)	2014
Boys Hockey Cooperative Team	2025

State Championships
Sports (Co-ed)	Years
Crew	2024,2025

=== Performing arts ===
Lyme-Old Lyme puts on a fall play and spring musical each year.

=== FIRST Robotics program ===
See team website

Lyme-Old Lyme High School's FIRST Robotics Competition Team 236, "The Techno-Ticks", won the Championship Chairman's Award in 2009.

== Notable faculty ==
- Jim Calhoun, basketball coach
- Jan Merrill, cross country coach

== Notable alumni ==
- Bob Beckel, political consultant, commentator, writer
- Liam Corrigan, US gold medalist rower
