= Valley Regional High School =

Location
- 256 Kelsey Hill Road; Deep River, Connecticut 06417; United States
- 41°22′17″N 72°26′47″W

Information
- Type: Public High School
- School district: Regional School District #4
- CEEB code: 070150
- Principal: Michael Barile
- Teaching staff: 46.00 (FTE)
- Grades: 9-12
- Enrollment: 429 (2024-2025)
- Student to teacher ratio: 9.33
- Colors: Red and black
- Athletics conference: Shoreline Conference
- Mascot: Warriors
- Accreditation: NEASC
- Newspaper: Voices of Valley
- Yearbook: TRIAD
- Website: www.vrhs.reg4.k12.ct.us

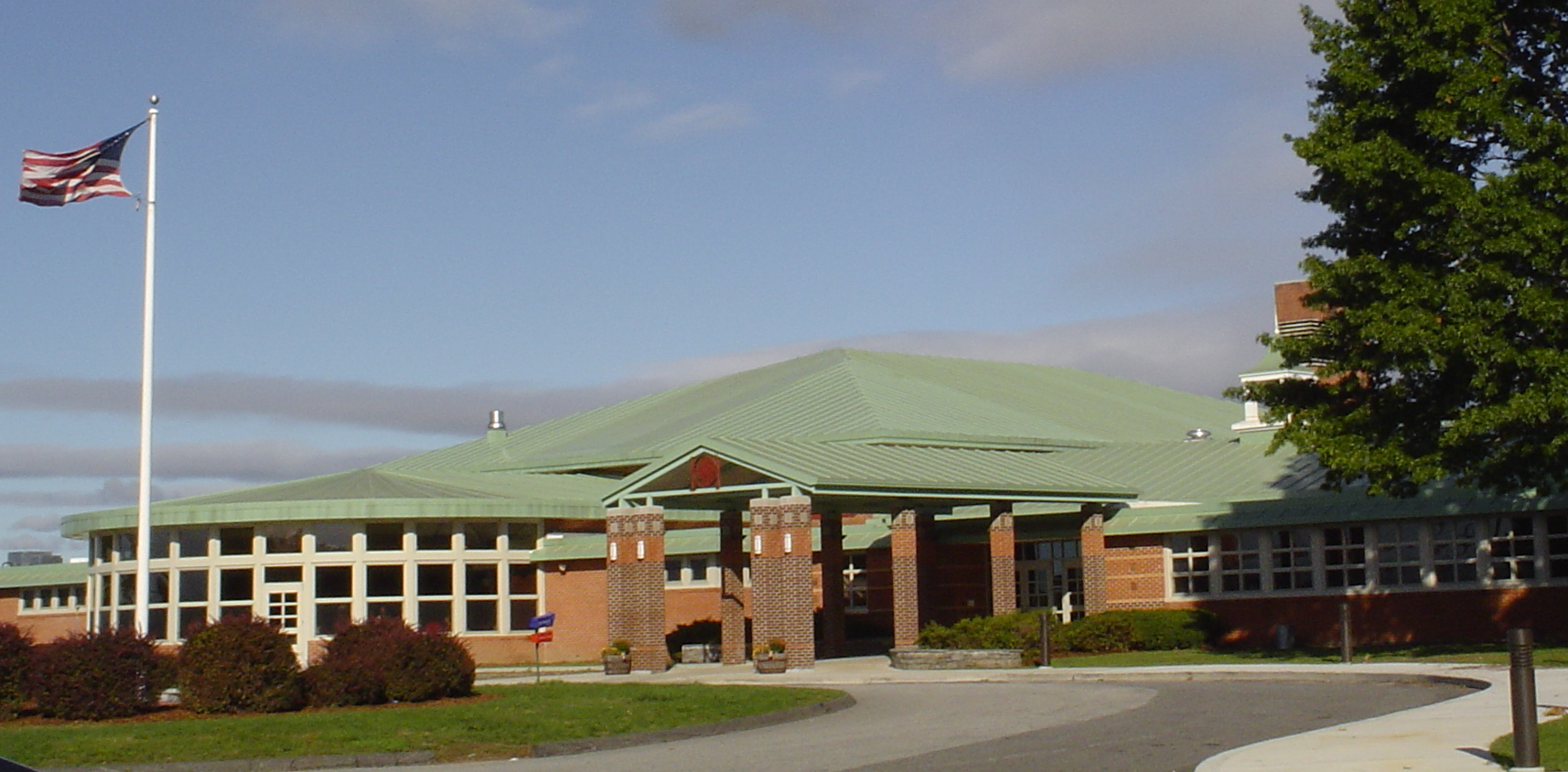
Valley Regional High School, Main Entrance

Valley Regional High School (VRHS) is located in Deep River, Connecticut, United States. It serves the three towns of Regional School District No. 4 - Essex, Chester, and Deep River.

In its 2011 edition, Newsweek magazine named Valley Regional as one of "America's Best High Schools," ranking 334th out of 500 nationally.

== Controversies ==
=== Mascot controversy ===
In the fall of 2019, controversy arose over the Valley Regional High School mascot, the "Warriors." Outcry reached a height after many students, former and current, spoke out, arguing that the mascot was disrespectful towards the Native American community. The administration decided to change the mascot. As of 2019, symbols of the Native American "warrior" head were removed from the school. Valley Regional still uses the name Warrior; however, the logo is a "V" rather than a Native American face.

=== Eric Rice controversy ===
In July 2010, the Region 4 Board of Education announced its selection of Eric Rice as the new principal of Valley Regional High School. Superintendent Levy was a vocal advocate for Rice's selection, stating he has "an outstanding background in science, mathematics, and technology", and a strong "commitment to our school community".

However, after less than three weeks on the job, reports surfaced of his possible dismissal with unconfirmed accounts that Superintendent Levy had given an ultimatum that Rice resign or face possible dismissal. Approximately two weeks later, the Region 4 Board of Education accepted the resignation of Eric Rice, making him the shortest serving principal in school history. Board of Education Chairwoman Linda Hall declined to comment on whether Rice's resignation was voluntary.

An Essex resident filed a complaint with the Connecticut Department of Education against the superintendent, alleging an "abuse of power" by Levy. The filed complaint also stated that the civil rights of the high school students had been violated due to a supposed "gag order" that "prevented students from discussing the circumstances of Rice's departure." The Connecticut Department of Education responded in a letter dated November 8, 2010 dismissing the complaint due to a lack of accompanying evidence to support the allegations. Superintendent Levy vehemently denied any "gag order" had been placed upon the students at the high school; the Board of Education subsequently hired an independent party (later determined to be Madison lawyer Stacey Lafferty) to investigate reports of a gag order, which found "no evidence or support for the claim that a gag order was issued or sanctioned", or that the civil rights of students were violated." The exact reason for the abrupt departure of Eric Rice have remained confidential and were not revealed to residents of Region 4.

== Academics ==
Valley Regional offers students a variety of classes spanning numerous subjects, including Art, Business, Mathematics, Music, English, World Languages, Science, and Technology Education. The school functions according to the block schedule, with each student enrolling in four courses per semester or a combination of full semester classes and quarter classes (which must add up to four full credits).

In order to graduate, students must earn 28.5 credits - a mixture of required as well as elective coursework.

Valley Regional offers Advanced Placement courses.

The school also maintains a relationship with the state's flagship collegiate institution, The University of Connecticut. Students must earn a grade of "C" or better if they wish to use the college credit at UConn or other universities that accept UConn credit.

=== Newsweek ranking ===
In its 2011 edition ranking "America's Best High Schools," Newsweek magazine named the Valley Regional 334th out of 500 nationally.

== Athletics ==
Valley Regional is a part of the Shoreline Conference of the Connecticut Interscholastic Athletic Conference (CIAC), with the exception of football, which is a member of the Pequot League, Sassacus division. The school's varsity sports consist of soccer, cross country, American football, volleyball, field hockey, indoor track, basketball, gymnastics, swimming, track, lacrosse, baseball, softball, golf, and tennis. The high school shares an athletic relationship with students from Lyme-Old Lyme High School for the football team.

The soccer team achieved a 16-4-1 record and advanced to its first state final championship match since 2000. The football team had first undefeated record (10-0) ever and advanced to the state final championship match. The girls' cross-country team ended the season undefeated, with a record of 19–0, and placed third in the state overall.

On March 18, 2011, the boys' basketball team won the Class S State Championship. The win brought the high school its second state basketball title, after the women's basketball team won the Class S State Championship in 1999. The women's team defeated Canton, 43 to 37, on March 13, 1999.

=== CIAC Championships ===
Wins in CIAC State Championships
Sport	Class	Year(s)
Basketball (boys)	S	2011
Basketball (boys)	M	2013
Basketball (girls)	S	1976, 1999
Basketball (girls)	M	1984
Field hockey	S	1993
Football	S-Large	2014 (In partnership with Old Lyme)
Gymnastics (girls)	S	2009, 2010, 2011
Soccer (boys)	S	1955, 1997 (Co-champions with Immaculate)
Soccer (boys)	M	1977 (Co-champions with RHAM)
Tennis (boys)	S	1978, 1980 (Co-champions with Granby Memorial and Old Lyme)
Track and field (indoor, boys)	S	1978
Track and field (outdoor, girls)	S	1993
Volleyball (girls)	S	1980, 1987, 1989, 2024

== Notable alumni ==
- Brian Dayett, Former MLB player (New York Yankees, Chicago Cubs)
- Lee Tergesen, Actor, (Oz, Wayne's World)
- Gretchen Mol, Actress, Model (Rounders)
- Jackie Burns, Broadway Actress ("Wicked")
