= Nathaniel Bar-Jonah =

American criminal (1957–2008)

- Born: David Paul Brown; February 15, 1957; Worcester, Massachusetts, U.S.
- Died: April 13, 2008 (aged 51); Montana State Prison, Deer Lodge, Montana, U.S.
- Other name: Nathaniel Benjamin Levi Bar-Jonah
- Occupation: Short order cook
- Height: 5 ft 10 in (1.78 m)
- Status: Deceased
- Convictions: Assault kidnapping attempted murder child molestation
- Penalty: 130 years imprisonment

Details
- Victims: No confirmed murders 1+ suspected murders 10+ survived child victims of sexual assault and torture
- Span of crimes: 1964–1999
- Country: United States
- States: Massachusetts; Connecticut; New Hampshire; Montana (confirmed); Wyoming (possible)
- Date apprehended: December 13, 1999

Nathaniel Benjamin Levi Bar-Jonah (born David Paul Brown; February 15, 1957 – April 13, 2008) was an American convicted child molester and suspected cannibalistic serial killer who was sentenced to 130 years in prison without the possibility of parole after being convicted of the kidnapping, aggravated assault and sexual assault of various children.

== Early life and criminal history ==
Nathaniel Bar-Jonah was born David Paul Brown in Worcester, Massachusetts, on February 15, 1957, the youngest of three children to Phillip and Tyra Brown, an aircraft mechanic and a housewife. When Tyra was three months pregnant with Bar-Jonah, she was involved in a serious car accident when another driver slammed into the back of her vehicle while she was sitting at a red light, resulting in her having to wear a neck brace for the last six months of her pregnancy.

As an infant, Bar-Jonah was described as being inactive and having an insatiable appetite, which resulted in him crying incessantly when he was not being fed. This caused him to gain so much weight as a baby that he became practically immobile due to his undeveloped muscle tone, and his parents struggled to carry him. Bar-Jonah also appeared to be strongly averse to being touched, and at three weeks old experienced hydrocephalus.

Shortly after Bar-Jonah's birth, his family moved to Lantana, Florida, and stayed there for six years when his father worked for McDonnell Douglas. In 1964, the family moved back to Worcester when Bar-Jonah's father became a heavy equipment mechanic at a local construction firm. According to Bar-Jonah, his father was a strict disciplinarian who frequently beat him with a thick leather belt, due to his fear that his son would grow up to be homosexual and because Bar-Jonah was a kleptomaniac who frequently stole from his siblings and other children.

In late July 1964, before the move back to Massachusetts, a then seven-year-old Bar-Jonah lured a five-year-old female neighbor into his basement, telling her that he had received a Ouija board for his birthday that could predict the future. Once in his basement, Brown attempted to strangle the girl. The child's screams attracted the attention of Bar-Jonah's mother, who came to her rescue, but he got off with little to no punishment.

At age 15, Bar-Jonah cut letters and words out of magazines and composed a note that he used to attempt to entice two young boys from Webster to a cemetery, offering them $20 and a surprise. In that case, the mother of the two boys declined to press charges against Bar-Jonah, thinking it would be best if he received psychiatric treatment. The following year, in May 1974, Bar-Jonah attempted to abduct nine-year-old Mary Patrone in Woodstock, Connecticut, but released her when she screamed and resisted.

In March 1975, now aged 18, Bar-Jonah impersonated a police officer in order to abduct eight-year-old Richard O'Conner on his way to school, proceeding to sexually assault and strangle the boy. A neighbor, looking out of her window, observed the abduction and notified authorities, who began searching for O'Conner. A patrol car later observed a vehicle matching that used in the abduction parked far away from others in a parking lot, and after calling for backup, ordered Bar-Jonah out of the car. A bloodied O'Conner was found inside the car, having defecated and urinated on himself from the sexual assault, and was near the point of death.

A few days before his high school graduation, Bar-Jonah drove to nearby Hartford, Connecticut, and, again impersonating a police officer, abducted a nine-year-old girl. However, after the child began vomiting and convulsing from the assault, he drove up to a sidewalk and threw the girl out of the car. A nearby witness saw the incident and got Bar-Jonah's license plate, leading to his arrest. News of this assault never reached Bar-Jonah's probation officer, and he was released from parole in May 1976 for his earlier abduction and sexual assault of O'Conner. When Bar-Jonah's probationary period was over, he received a letter thanking him for his "co-operation."

On September 24, 1977, Bar-Jonah, claiming to be an undercover FBI agent, convinced two boys coming out of a movie theater in Shrewsbury, Massachusetts, to enter his vehicle. He then transported the boys to a secluded area, where he handcuffed and tortured them. After jumping repeatedly on the chest of one of the boys, the 375-pound (170 kg) Bar-Jonah believed he had killed him, then drove off with the other boy still alive in his trunk. However, the first boy regained consciousness and managed to find help, leading shortly thereafter to Bar-Jonah's arrest; the other boy was found, still alive, in the trunk. For this crime, Bar-Jonah was convicted of attempted murder and received the maximum sentence of eighteen to twenty years at the Massachusetts Correctional Institution – Concord, but was later transferred to the Bridgewater State Hospital for observation after sharing his violent sexual fantasies with a prison psychologist. At the conclusion of the observation period, Bar-Jonah was sentenced to an indefinite term at Bridgewater.

== Incarceration and release ==
On March 22, 1984, David Paul Brown legally changed his name to "Nathaniel Benjamin Levi Bar-Jonah." He gave several reasons for changing his name; he told friends and relatives that he wanted to know what it was like to be discriminated against and persecuted as a Jew. During a later 2008 interview with Dr. Michael H. Stone for the television show Most Evil, he claimed he was Jewish and wanted his name to reflect that. In fact, Bar-Jonah's ethnic ancestry was Scandinavian and his parents were both active in the Assemblies of God, a Pentecostal sect, and he did not pursue any further connection to Judaism other than the name change.

Later in 1984, Bar-Jonah, along with two psychologists that had evaluated him, won a parole hearing after the psychologists testified that he was no longer a threat to society. Superior Court Judge Walter Steele ruled that the Commonwealth of Massachusetts had failed to prove that Bar-Jonah was dangerous, and ordered him released on February 12, 1991. Administrative issues prevented his release until July of that year. During this time, Bar-Jonah confided in psychiatrists that he fantasized about abducting, murdering and cannibalizing children. A psychiatrist at Bridgewater was apparently informed by Bar-Jonah that his interest in torture had long existed and that his primary means of sexual arousal came from the violent thoughts he entertained.

On August 9, 1991, just a month after being released from Bridgewater, Bar-Jonah observed a seven-year-old boy sitting alone in a car outside of a post office in Oxford, Massachusetts. Bar-Jonah, who weighed 275 pounds (125 kg) at the time, entered the vehicle and sat on the boy's chest. Some witnesses, along with the boy's mother, observed the event and ran to the boy's rescue, causing Bar-Jonah to flee. An officer recognised Bar-Jonah's description from over fifteen years earlier, and he was later arrested for the attack. At first, Bar-Jonah claimed that he entered the car to get out of the rain, but later admitted that he intended to kill the boy. For the attack, Bar-Jonah was given permission by the Worcester County District Attorney to enter a guilty plea to assault and battery in exchange for a two-year probationary period and the promise that he would move to Great Falls, Montana, to live with his mother.

== Arrest and discovery ==
On February 6, 1996, ten-year-old Zachary Xerxes "Zach" Ramsay left the apartment he shared with his mother at around 7:34 a.m. to attend Whittier School, taking his usual route through an alleyway near the 400 block of north Fourth Street in Great Falls. He never arrived at school. Ramsay was wearing a blue denim jacket with green sleeves, a blue football jersey with his last name imprinted on the back in gold letters, stonewashed jeans and black high-top sneakers. A family of three who lived in an apartment overlooking the alleyway reported seeing Ramsay there that morning, and also reported seeing an off-white, four-door car nearly run him over.

Another witness reported seeing Ramsay standing in the alleyway. Yet another witness, who lived near the end of the alleyway, reported seeing Ramsay crying with an upset obese adult male following him a few feet behind at about 7:45 a.m. A witness who personally knew Bar-Jonah reported seeing him standing beside a dumpster in the alleyway at 7:15 a.m. while taking out the trash; he was wearing a navy-blue "police-like" jacket. The same witness also reported seeing Ramsay enter the alleyway later and that Bar-Jonah was still standing beside the dumpster.

Somewhere in the alley between Sixth Street and Seventh, Ramsay disappeared and he was never found. School officials contacted his mother when he failed to report for classes that day. His mother filed a missing person's report later that afternoon. Detective Bill Bellusci was given a list of local registered sex offenders by the FBI, but focused his suspicion on Bar-Jonah, who was not on the list. Bellusci requested a search warrant for the house where Bar-Jonah and his mother lived after police made an unsuccessful attempt to access the property, but he was denied. Bellusci unsuccessfully solicited a new search warrant. Shortly afterward, Bar-Jonah moved out of his mother's house.

On December 13, 1999, Bar-Jonah was seen outside an elementary school for the third time in a week. He was wearing a dark-blue jacket and a knit cap, and was carrying two cans of pepper spray, a toy gun and badge. Bellusci and the Montana attorney general charged Bar-Jonah with impersonating an officer and for carrying a concealed weapon. A judge approved a search warrant on December 15, for impersonation objects in both Bar-Jonah's new apartment and his mother's house. Police found two coats, one with a toy badge in the pocket, a second toy badge, a stun gun, and a baseball cap reading "Security Enforcement". They also found a pulley on the ceiling of Bar-Jonah's kitchen, two albums with cut-outs of children, a document about knots and bondage and an article on autoerotic asphyxia.

Police investigations conducted years after Ramsay's disappearance determined that Bar-Jonah had access to his mother's off-white, four-door 1978 Toyota Corolla the day Ramsay vanished, and that his mother and brother were out of town for a funeral. It was moreover determined that Bar-Jonah did not work on the day of the disappearance, nor on the days immediately preceding.

Two days after the property searches, Bellusci was granted a second search warrant for any documents and photographic material. While searching Bar-Jonah's apartment, detectives found a list of fifty-four boys' names called "Lake Webster," which were later identified as boys from Bar-Jonah's youth in Massachusetts, including three of whom he had been convicted of abducting in the mid-1970s–and a "Zackery Ramsey," followed by the word "DIED." Furthermore, dozens of newspaper clippings were found in Bar-Jonah's apartment following the Ramsay case. Hundreds of thousands of photographs of children, and undeveloped film containing sexual images of Bar-Jonah and three Native American boys, who later testified against him, were also recovered.

A former roommate of Bar-Jonah described finding clothes in his apartment which appeared to match those Ramsay was wearing the day he disappeared, in addition to bloody gloves. Another roommate claimed that Bar-Jonah sometimes spontaneously brought up Ramsay in conversations; once, a few days before he disappeared, and another time when he said that Ramsay would never be found because he had been "chopped up" and the parts scattered in different places. Investigators also found notebooks with seemingly arbitrary characters which were believed to be coded writing. With the help of the FBI, and after months of effort, the writing was decoded; in the notebooks, Bar-Jonah described torturing and eating children; there were also macabre recipes involving children's body parts.

On July 5, 2000, Montana police charged Bar-Jonah with kidnapping and sexual assault, as well as the kidnapping and sexual assault of three other boys, and the murder of Zach Ramsay. Bar-Jonah was held at the Cascade County jail in Great Falls. He pleaded innocent to all of the charges. Prosecutors announced they would be seeking the death penalty.

== Trial, imprisonment and death ==
Bar-Jonah was prosecuted for the abduction and molestation of three boys and convicted of kidnapping, aggravated assault and sexual assault, including charges that he had tortured one of the boys and hung him from the ceiling. Ramsay's mother was swayed by Bar-Jonah's defense team to testify for them that she believed her son was still alive, which led jurors not to convict Bar-Jonah for his murder. During his trial, 36-year-old Mary Patrone recognized Bar-Jonah as the man who had assaulted and attempted to abduct her in 1974. However, the statute of limitations had expired, and Bar-Jonah could not be charged with that crime. Bar-Jonah was sentenced to 130 years in prison. He maintained his innocence up until his death. Despite the objections of his mother, a judge declared Zachary Ramsay legally dead in 2011.

Montana authorities were unaware of Bar-Jonah's criminal record in Massachusetts, a fact that was cited by activists campaigning to force former sex offenders to register. In December 2004, the Montana Supreme Court turned down Bar-Jonah's appeals and upheld the conviction and 130-year prison sentence. Bar-Jonah was found unresponsive in his prison cell on the morning of April 13, 2008. He had been in poor health. His postmortem found significant levels of LDL in his arteries and myocardial infarction was the determined cause of death.

== Further investigations ==
=== Suspected victims ===
Although Bar-Jonah was never convicted of Ramsay's abduction and murder, he is still widely believed to have been responsible and is also suspected to have committed additional homicides in Montana because of the findings made in his residences. Evidence shows Bar-Jonah frequently traveled to Massachusetts, Arkansas, Colorado, Florida, Wyoming, Michigan and Washington State. He was also investigated for possible crimes in the Canadian provinces of Alberta and Saskatchewan, where he lived at times during the 1990s, but police found no links between him and any unsolved cases.

- Janice Kathryn Pockett, aged 7, vanished on July 26, 1973, at 3:00 p.m. after leaving her Tolland, Connecticut, home to look for a butterfly she had left under a rock in a wooded area on Rhodes Road. A road less than a mile from their house is where her mother discovered her bicycle a half-hour later. After discovering the butterfly, the authorities assumed that Pockett had been kidnapped. Investigators believe Bar-Jonah may have been involved in her case after it was discovered that he lived twenty miles away, in Webster, at the time she disappeared. He would have been only sixteen years old when Janice vanished, but Pockett's disappearance occurred only ten months prior to his attempted abduction of Patrone.
- When detectives sprayed Bar-Jonah's garage with a phosphorus chemical while investigating the Ramsay disappearance, the word "Tita" appeared, which led authorities to believe that he may have been responsible for the abduction of 15-year-old James Teta, a Massachusetts youth. At 11:30 a.m. on August 23, 1973, Teta left his home on Suffolk Avenue in Revere, Massachusetts, to hitchhike to Boston. He was last seen two hours later near Boston's Government Center. Teta's body was discovered on August 25, in woodland near a desolate stretch of roadway in Rindge, New Hampshire, off of Route 119. His body was nude and an autopsy revealed that he had been raped and strangled. His case remains unsolved.
- Four-year-old Andrew John Amato resided in a mobile home on Richards Avenue in Webster, Massachusetts. On the morning of September 30, 1978, Amato spent the day playing with his sister, aged 7, and their cousin, aged 6, in the woods behind the neighboring Ash Street Trailer Park. Without his sister, Amato and his cousin ventured further into the woods. Amato eventually fell and hurt himself, dropped and misplaced his favorite toy, and then started sobbing and running in circles. Amato refused to leave without the toy. By 10:30 a.m., Amato's cousin advised him to remain where he was and went back to the house to get help. Nevertheless, by the time they got back to the woods, Amato had disappeared. He has not been seen or heard from since. About fifty yards from Road 52, which is now Interstate 395, the boy vanished. Some people theorize that he wandered over to the road and was picked up by a passing motorist. Bar-Jonah was investigated for possible involvement in Amato's case.
- Another case tentatively linked to Bar-Jonah was the unsolved disappearance of 14-year-old Amanda Dawn Gallion. On the morning of October 13, 1997, Gallion left her home in Gillette, Wyoming, at approximately 7:15 a.m. to bicycle to school, but never arrived. Bar-Jonah arrived in Gillette on the night of October 12, where he stayed at a small motel on the outskirts of town, and was back in his Montana residence by the following night. Gallion's bicycle was subsequently discovered near Interstate 90. Her social security number has not been used since her disappearance. An accused murderer from South Dakota was later implicated in her disappearance in 2007, but the case was dropped because the informant and fellow inmate who made the accusations, Aloysius Black Crow, was found to have given false testimony in another case. Gillette police believe Gallion may have ran away with her 20-year-old boyfriend Patrick Lee Ghering, who vanished on October 19, 1997, when his car was found abandoned; his Social Security number has also never been used since his disappearance.

=== Allegations of cannibalism ===
Bar-Jonah's earliest interest in cannibalism can be traced to his childhood. Beginning at about the age of 6, he would pick at his scabs until they bled, then proceed to suck on the blood from the wound. School authorities would call his mother numerous times to notify her that his habit was upsetting to the teachers and students. When he was incarcerated in Montana State Prison, many of the staff and prisoners observed him perform the same habit. One guard reported that once Bar-Jonah had a scab in his mouth that he "appeared to be having sex." While incarcerated at Bridgewater State Hospital, Bar-Jonah confided in psychiatrists about his murderous and cannibalistic ideations. One therapist noted that his "sexual fantasies, bizarre in nature, outline methods of torture [and] extend ... to dissection and cannibalism" and that he "express[ed] a curiosity about the taste of human flesh."

Although Bar-Jonah was known to be a voracious eater, who weighed in excess of 300 pounds (140 kg), financial records indicated that he had not made any significant grocery store purchases for nearly a month after Ramsay disappeared. However, he could have also paid for any groceries using cash or have been well-stocked on food and meat. After Ramsay's disappearance, Bar-Jonah also began to hold cookouts in which he was reported to serve burgers, spaghetti, chili, meat pies, casseroles and the like to guests. At many of these cookouts, a number of persons told Bar-Jonah that the meat had a peculiar taste to it; his response was that he had gone deer hunting and used venison in the dishes. However, Bar-Jonah did not own a rifle or a hunting license, nor had he been deer hunting at any time. To one woman, who told Bar-Jonah that she found the taste of his meat to be repulsive, he replied that he had personally "hunted, killed, butchered and wrapped the meat" of the deer. He would later be accused of molesting her son.

During the timeframe of Ramsay's disappearance, Bar-Jonah held a part-time job in the kitchen at Malmstrom Air Force Base and another at a Hardee's fast-food restaurant in downtown Great Falls, leading to speculation that he could have used his position at these two jobs to further get rid of evidence by feeding it to unsuspecting military personnel and customers, but there was never sufficient evidence to prove such an assertion. In Bar-Jonah's apartment, detectives also found a number of recipes using children's body parts with titles such as "little boy pot pie," "french fried kid" and phrases such as "lunch is served on the patio with roasted child" and "Barbecue bee sum young guy." In the decoded journals, Bar-Jonah also referenced serving these recipes to neighbors.

During a search at one of Bar-Jonah's previous residences in Great Falls, authorities dug up portions of the garage and sifted through nearly two tons of dirt in which they found twenty-one fragments of human bones. Although it was eventually determined that the bones were those of an unidentified African-American child, a boy believed to be between the ages of 8 and 13, DNA analysis showed that the bones were not those of Ramsay and the DNA sample also did not match human hair found in Bar-Jonah's kitchen. When investigators decided that they wanted to examine the sewer pipes beneath the house in which Bar-Jonah had previously resided, they were told by the owner that the pipes had all been replaced after Bar-Jonah moved out because they were always getting clogged.

== See also ==
- Child cannibalism
- List of incidents of cannibalism
