= David C. Brown =

English footballer

Personal information
- Place of birth: England
- Position: Centre forward

Senior career*
Years	Team	Apps	(Gls)
1896–1897	Burnley	4	(1)
- * Club domestic league appearances and goals

David C. Brown was an English professional footballer who played as a centre forward for Burnley.
