= David Tilden Brown =

- Born: August 11, 1823; Greenfield, Massachusetts
- Died: September 4, 1889 (aged 66); Batavia, Illinois
- Education: College of Physicians and Surgeons (MD, 1844)
- Occupation: psychiatrist

David Tilden Brown (August 11, 1823 - Greenfield, Massachusetts – September 4, 1889 - Batavia, Illinois) practiced psychiatry from 1844-1849 in various asylums in eastern United States. When gold was found in the Sierra Nevada, Brown decided to cash in and travel to Central America in 1849, planning to establish a cheaper and faster commercial route west from the Atlantic to the Pacific Oceans across the isthmus of Nicaragua. He and his associates formed the Compania de Vapores de Nicaragua, but the company eventually was absorbed by Cornelius Vanderbilt's American Atlantic and Pacific Ship Canal Company.

Brown returned to the practice of medicine from 1852-1877. He was the medical advisor along with the architect Calvert Vaux, for plans to build the Sheppard Asylum, a modern hospital for mental patients, in Baltimore, Maryland, which opened in 1891. Brown suffered poor health and retired to his home in Batavia, Illinois. It was there that he committed suicide in 1889.
