= Jason Walter Brown =

American neurologist (born 1938)

Jason W. Brown
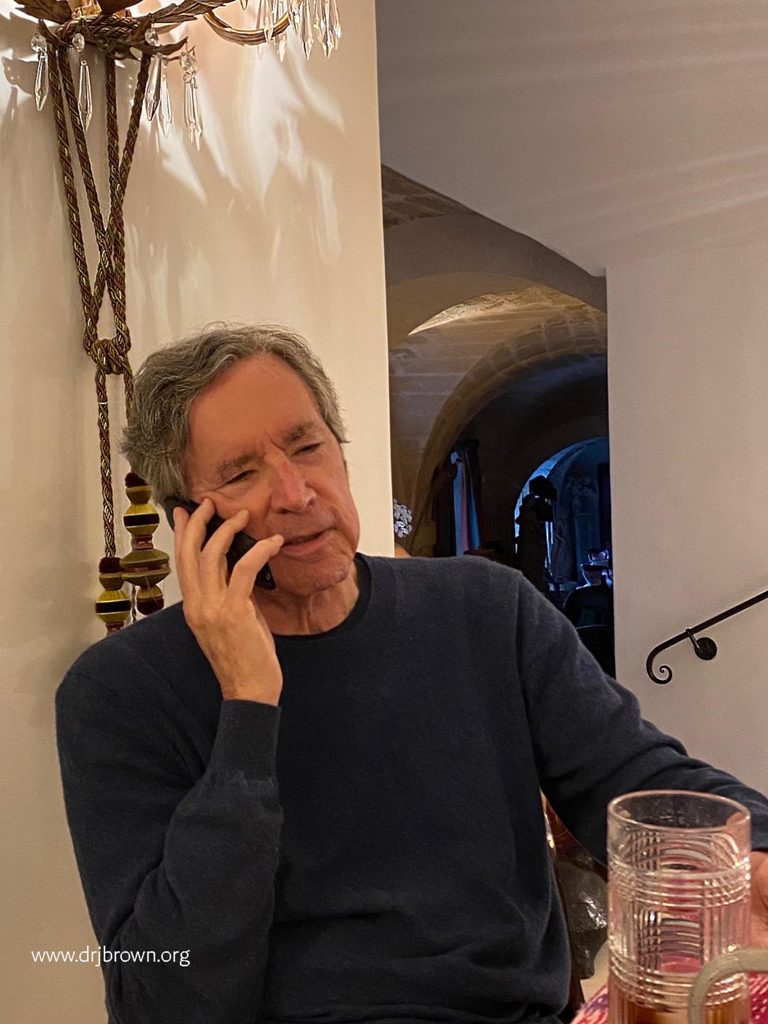
- Born: April 14, 1938 (age 88); New York
- Education: University of California, Los Angeles/Berkeley (BA); University of Southern California, Los Angeles (MD)
- Occupations: Clinical Professor, Neurology (Retd)
- Organization: New York University Medical Center
- Website: https://www.drjbrown.org/

Jason W. Brown (born April 14, 1938) is an American neurologist and writer of works in neuropsychology and philosophy of mind. He has been a reviewer and recipient of grants and fellowships from the National Institutes of Health and the Alexander von Humboldt Foundation and is or has been on the editorial boards of leading journals in his field. He has written 21 books, edited 4 others, and more than 200 articles.

Brown is the founder and chief neurologist of the Center For Cognition and Communication (CCC).

== Education ==
Premedical studies at the University of California in Los Angeles, graduation from Berkeley in 1959. Medical school at the University of Southern California in Los Angeles, with M.D. in 1963.

== Career ==
He returned to Los Angeles for a residency in neurology at UCLA. 1967–1969 in the Army, in Korea and San Francisco. In 1969, he took a post-doctoral fellowship at the Boston Veteran's Hospital. In 1970, he was invited to the staff of Columbia-Presbyterian Hospital in New York as assistant professor. In 1976, he received a fellowship from the Foundations Fund for Research in Psychiatry to spend a year at the Centre Neuropsychologique et Neurolinguistique in Paris. On his return, he joined the staff of New York University Medical Center, eventually as clinical professor in neurology.

The Center for Cognition and Communication (CCC) was established to provide treatment for clients with head injury, stroke, and other acquired and developmental disorders of cognition.

Since 2002, Brown and his wife Carine house and co-organize Philosophy Nexus workshops on South of France.

== Books ==
- Brown, J. W. (1972). Aphasia, apraxia and agnosia. Clinical and theoretical aspects Springfield, IL: Thomas
- Brown, J. W. (1977). Mind, brain and consciousness. New York: Academic
- Brown, J. W. (1988). Life of the mind. New Jersey: Erlbaum
- Brown, J. W. (1991). Self and process. New York: Springer-Verlag.
- Brown, J. W. (1996). Time, will and mental process. New York: Plenum Press.
- Brown, J. W. (2000). Mind and nature: essays on time and subjectivity. London: Whurr
- Brown, J. W. (2001). The Self-Embodied Mind: Process, Brain Dynamics, and the Conscious Present. Barrytown: Station Hill Press
- Brown, J. W. (2005). Process and the authentic life. Toward a psychology of value. Heusenstamm: Ontos Verlag, De Gruyter
- Brown, J. W. (2010). Neuropsychological foundations of conscious experience. Louvain-la-Neuve, Belgium: Les Editions Chromatika
- Brown, J. W. (2011). Gourmet's guide to the mind. Louvain-la-Neuve, Belgium: Les Editions Chromatika.
- Brown, J. W. (2012). Love and other emotions. London: Karnac Press
- Brown, J. W. (2015). Microgenetic theory and process thought. Exeter, UK: Imprint Academic
- Brown, J. W. (2017). Metapsychology of the creative process. Continuous novelty as the ground of creative advance. Exeter: Imprint Academic
- Brown, J. W. (2017). Reflections on mind and the image of reality. Eugene, Oregon: Resource Publications
- Brown, J.W. (2024), Ausgewählte Aufsätze zu einer Prozesspsychologie. Herausgegeben von Paul Stenner und Denys Zhadiaiev Von Dr. Jason W. Brown. Verlag Karl Alber: Baden-Baden ISBN 978-3-495-99305-7 (Whitehead Studien, Bd. 11), 2024
- Brown, J.W., Stenner, P. (2024), The Microgenetic Theory of Mind and Brain. Selected Essays in Process Psychology. (Ed. Denys Zhadiaiev). Routledge: New York.] ISBN 978-1-032-87384-8, Dec 6, 2024

=== Edited ===
- Brown, J. W. (1973). Aphasia, tran. of A. Pick, Aphasie, Springfield: Thomas.
- Brown, J. W. (1981). Jargonaphasia (Ed.) New York: Academic.
- Brown, J. W. (1988). Agnosia and apraxia (Ed.) New Jersey: Erlbaum.
- Brown, J. W. (1989). Neuropsychology of perception. New Jersey: Erlbaum

== Selected articles ==
- Brown, J.W. (2013). in: Bradford, D. (2013) Microgenesis and the Mind/Brain State: Interview with Jason Brown, Mind and Matter, 11 (2) 183-203
- Brown, J.W. (2014). Feeling, Journal of mind and behavior, Vol. 35, No. 1/2 (Winter and Spring 2014), pp. 1–20 (20 pages)
- Brown, J.W. (2017). Microgenetic theory of perception, memory and the mental state. Journal of consciousness studies, 24:51-70
- Brown, Jason, W. (2018). "Agency and the will". Mind and Matter. 16 (2): 195–211 – via ResearchGate.
- Brown, Jason W. (2018). "Theoretical Note on the Nature of the Present". Process Studies. 47 (1–2): 163–171. doi:10.5406/processstudies.47.1-2.0163. ISSN 2154-3682.
- Brown, Jason, W. (2018). "The mind and brain in time: implications for modern neuropsychology". Acta Neuropsychologica. 16 (1): 99–116. doi:10.5604/01.3001.0011.7067. ISSN 1730-7503.
- Brown, Jason W. (2018). Some thoughts on the nature of existence. Belgium: Chromatika. ISBN 9782930517544.
- Brown, Jason, W. (2018). Simultaneity and Serial Order. Belgium: Chromatika. ISBN 9782930517544.
- Brown, Jason, W. (2020). "Time and the dream". Neuropsychoanalysis. 22 (1–2): 129–138. doi:10.1080/15294145.2020.1835527.
- Brown, Jason W. (2021). "The Mind/Brain State". The Journal of Mind and Behavior. 42 (1): 1–16. ISSN 0271-0137.
- Brown, Jason, W. (2022). "From Drive to Value". Process Studies. 51 (2): 204–220. doi:10.5406/21543682.51.2.04.
- Brown, Jason, W. (September 22–24, 2022). "Exploring Consciousness: Non-Duality to Non-Locality – The Man Machine Debate". India Foundation.
