= David Brown (footballer, born 1963) =

English footballer

Personal information
- Full name: David Brown
- Date of birth: 21 October 1963 (age 63)
- Place of birth: Wallasey, England
- Position: Defender

Youth career
- Tranmere Rovers

Senior career*
| Years | Team | Apps | (Gls) |
| 1982–1983 | Tranmere Rovers | 1 | (0) |
- * Club domestic league appearances and goals

David Brown (born 21 October 1963) is an English footballer, who played as a defender. He made one (non-contracted) appearance in the Football League for Tranmere Rovers during the 1982–83 season.
