= David Brown (cricketer, born 1900) =

Scottish cricketer

Personal information
- Full name: David Brown
- Born: 29 July 1900; Dunfermline, Fife, Scotland
- Died: 30 January 1951 (aged 50); Dunfermline, Fife, Scotland
- Batting: Right-handed
- Bowling: Right-arm medium

Domestic team information
- Years: Team
- 1927–1930: Scotland

Career statistics
Competition	First-class
Matches	2
Runs scored	21
Batting average	7.00
100s/50s	–/–
Top score	13
Balls bowled	108
Wickets	1
Bowling average	43.00
5 wickets in innings	–
10 wickets in match	–
Best bowling	1/10
Catches/stumpings	1/–
- Source: Cricinfo, 19 July 2022

David Brown (29 July 1900 — 30 January 1951) was a Scottish first-class cricketer and civil servant.

Brown was born in July 1900 at Dunfermline. A club cricketer for both Dunfermline Cricket Club and Fifeshire County, Brown made two appearances in first-class cricket for Scotland, both against Ireland. The first came in 1927 at Dublin, with the second following in 1930 at Aberdeen. He scored 21 runs in his two matches, with a highest score of 13, while with his right-arm medium pace bowling, he took a single wicket. Outside of cricket, Brown was employed as a clerical officer by the Inland Revenue. He died at Dunfermline in January 1951.
