= David Brown (British artist) =

British painter

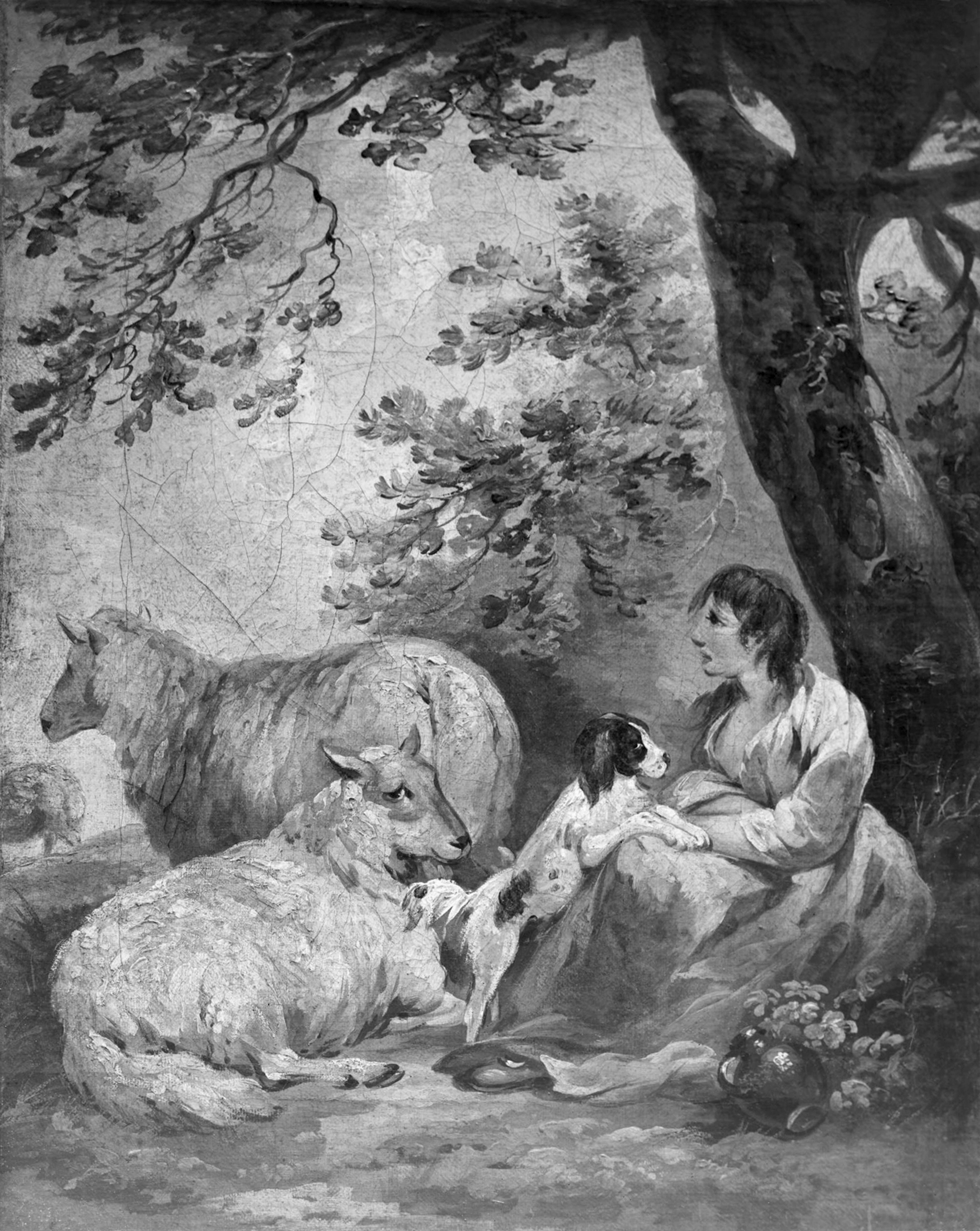
David Brown, A Shepherdess with Sheep, 1790s. Oil on canvas, 15 1/2 x 12 in., unlocated

David Brown (active 1792 ‒ 1797) was a British landscape and genre painter.

According to Walter Gilbey, Brown was a house and sign painter who "cherished higher artistic ambitions and had set his heart on learning to painting like George Morland," a British artist famous for his animal paintings and scenes of rustic life. After selling his business, Brown studied with Morland and became one of his many imitators. Although his paintings featured a more gestural brushstroke and a heavier use of impasto, his works often passed for those of his master. Brown exhibited ten paintings at the Royal Academy between 1792 and 1797, including pasticci of Morland and views of London, which some critics have suggested are his most successful works. He supplemented his income during these years by selling paintings by Morland that he had acquired during his tenure in the artist's studio. Brown eventually became a drawing master.

== Gallery ==
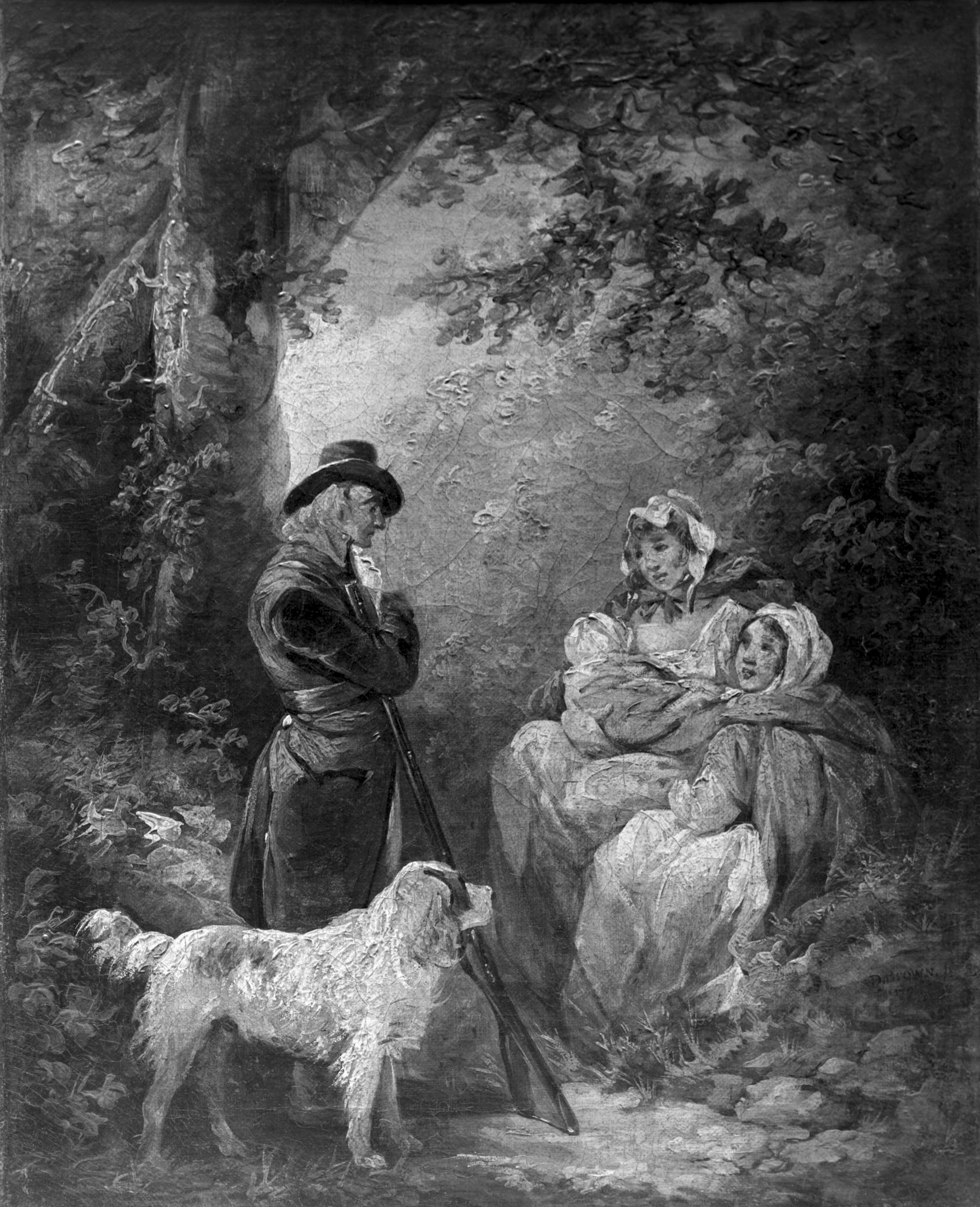
David Brown, A Sportsman with Peasant Women and Dog, undated. Oil on canvas, 15 1/2 x 12 in., unlocated

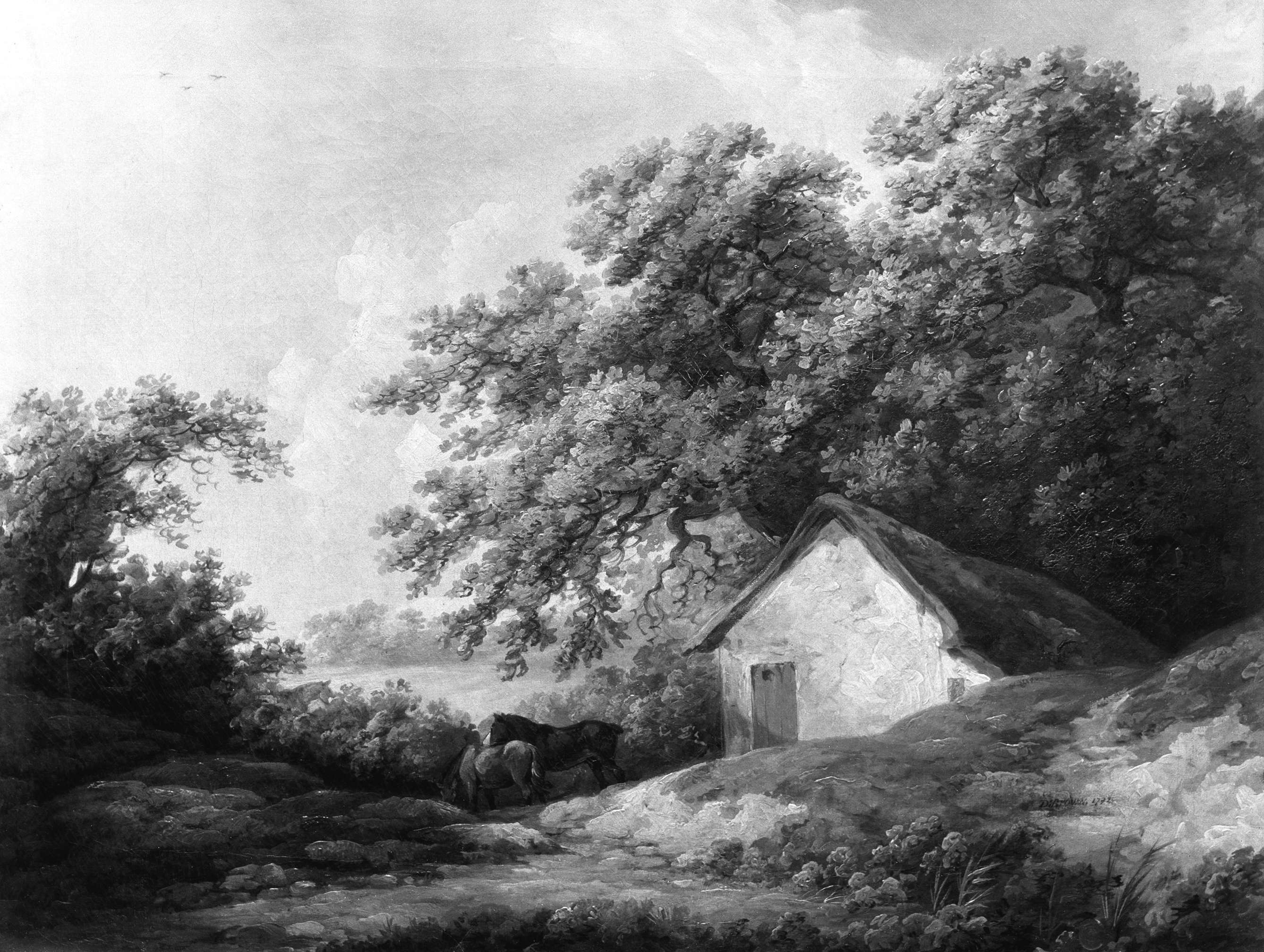
David Brown, A Woody Landscape, 1792. Oil on canvas, 19 1/2 x 25 1/2 in., formerly in the collection of Lawson Peacock
