= David Brown (footballer, born 1889) =

Scottish footballer

Personal information
- Full name: David Crichton Brown
- Date of birth: 26 July 1889
- Place of birth: Broughty Ferry, Scotland
- Date of death: after 1909
- Position: Centre forward

Senior career*
Years	Team	Apps	(Gls)
1909–1910	Tottenham Hotspur	1	(0)
?–?	Greenock Morton		
- * Club domestic league appearances and goals

David Crichton Brown (26 July 1889 – after 1909) was a Scottish professional footballer who played for Tottenham Hotspur and Greenock Morton.

== Football career ==
Brown began his career at Forthill Athletic. After a trial at Reading, Brown joined Tottenham Hotspur. The centre forward participated in one match in 1910 in his time at White Hart Lane before further trials at Birmingham in 1911 and later Merthyr Town. Brown ended his career at Greenock Morton.
