= Murder of David Knapps =

1999 murder of a corrections officer at Louisiana State Penitentiary

- Location: Louisiana State Penitentiary, Angola, Louisiana, United States
- Date: December 28, 1999
- Attack type: Murder and prison escape
- Weapons: A homemade knife, a small hammer and other weapons
- Deaths: 2 (including one of the perpetrators)
- Injuries: 1
- Perpetrators: Jeffrey Clark; David Brown; David Mathis; Barry Edge; Robert Carley; Joel Durham (deceased)
- Verdict: Guilty
- Convictions: First-degree murder (x5)
- Sentence: Death – Jeffrey Clark and David Brown; Life imprisonment without parole – David Mathis, Barry Edge and Robert Carley

The murder of David Knapps (December 8, 1950 — December 28, 1999), a corrections officer, occurred on December 28, 1999, at the Louisiana State Penitentiary in Angola, Louisiana. On that date, a group of six inmates, who were all convicted murderers serving life imprisonment at the facility itself, orchestrated a prison escape attempt and took three correction officers hostage, and during the siege itself, Corrections Captain David Knapps, then 49 years old, was murdered by the group before they were surrounded by armed guards. One of the six perpetrators, Joel Durham, was killed by the guards before the remaining members were subdued and arrested.

The surviving five inmates, known as the Angola 5, were all charged with the murder of Knapps. Out of the five, two members, Jeffrey Clark and David Brown, were found guilty of first-degree murder and sentenced to death, while the rest – David Mathis, Barry Edge and Robert Carley – were all sentenced to life without parole for their respective roles in the murder.

== Prison siege and murder ==
On December 28, 1999, at the Louisiana State Penitentiary in Angola, Louisiana, a corrections officer was murdered in the line of duty by a group of inmates who pulled off an escape attempt.

On that day itself, six inmates serving life sentences for murder — 23-year-old David Dwayne Mathis, 39-year-old Jeffrey Clark, 26-year-old David Brown, 26-year-old Joel Durham, 31-year-old Robert Carley, and 39-year-old Barry Edge — orchestrated an escape attempt. Armed with homemade knife, a small hammer and other weapons, the group conducted their plot at around 8:30pm in the education building of Camp D, an 850-bed unit of cellblocks and dormitories at the prison. Additionally, the group also attacked and took three correctional officers hostage; these officers were identified as Captain David Knapps, Sergeant Reddia Walker and Lieutenant Douglas Chaney.

While both Sergeant Walker and Lieutenant Chaney were held at knifepoint in a classroom, Knapps was held in an employee restroom, where he was severely assaulted after he refused to hand over the keys to the inmates, and as a result of this refusal, Knapps was beaten to death with a hammer. The hostage situation lasted for two hours and was dissolved after armed guards subdued the inmates. Two of the inmates were shot during the confrontation: one of them, Mathis, was shot in the chin but survived, while the other, Durham, was shot and killed.

At the time of his death, Knapps was 49 years old and he had served 12 years as a prison officer; one of his daughters was a secretary at the prison itself. Knapps was the first correctional officer killed at the prison since April 1972.

== Participants ==
In March 2004, more than four years after the murder of Captain David Knapps, the surviving five killers, known as the "Angola 5", were charged with first-degree murder and indicted by a grand jury. The prosecution expressed their intent to seek the death penalty for the Angola 5.

Jeffrey Cameron Clark

Jeffrey Cameron Clark (born June 4, 1960), a member of the Angola 5, was first incarcerated at the Louisiana State Penitentiary for the 1984 murder of Andrew H. Cheswick.

According to sources, Clark, a former employee of a lounge in Baton Rouge, perpetuated an armed robbery that led to the death of Cheswick (the lounge's manager) on October 18, 1984. Clark was convicted of first-degree murder in this case and was sentenced to death after a trial. However, upon his appeal in 1986, Clark's death sentence was vacated by the Louisiana Supreme Court despite the affirmation of his conviction. In the end, Clark was re-sentenced to life imprisonment without the possibility of parole for Cheswick's murder, and by 1999, the year when he killed Knapps, Clark had already served 15 years behind bars.

David Brown

David Brown (born January 13, 1973) was the only African-American member of the Angola 5. Brown was first incarcerated at the Louisiana State Penitentiary for the 1992 murder of Harvey Reese.

According to sources, Brown had shot and killed Reese in Marrero on May 17, 1992, just two days after he was released on parole for his second theft conviction. For the killing itself, Brown was found guilty of second-degree murder and sentenced to life imprisonment. By the time he killed Knapps, this was Brown's seventh year of imprisonment for Reese's killing.

David Dwayne Mathis

David Dwayne Mathis (born 1976), a member of the Angola 5, was first incarcerated at the Louisiana State Penitentiary for the 1992 murder of his grandmother.

Based on an article covering his trial, when Mathis was only 16, he strangled his adoptive grandmother, 62-year-old Gloria Ryder, to death at their house in Baker on Valentine Day of 1992. In August 1992, Mathis was convicted of second-degree murder and sentenced to life in prison for the killing of Ryder. By the time he killed Knapps in 1999, Mathis had served seven years out of his life term.

Barry S. Edge

Barry S. Edge (born 1960), a member of Angola 5, was first incarcerated at the Louisiana State Penitentiary for the 1985 murder of Clifford Stover Jr.

According to court sources, on May 5, 1985, Clifford Stover Jr. was shot twice and killed by Edge at the parking lot of his apartment in Gretna. As a result of this offence, Edge was found guilty of second-degree murder and sentenced to life without parole. His appeal was rejected by the 5th Circuit Court of Appeal of Louisiana on March 15, 1987. At the time of Knapps's murder, Edge had already served 14 years of his life sentence.

Robert G. Carley

Robert G. Carley (born 1968), a member of the Angola 5 and mastermind of the escape attempt, was first incarcerated at the Louisiana State Penitentiary for the 1987 murder of Robert Esposito.

Prior to the 1987 killing, Carley had previous convictions for various offences as a juvenile in the state of New York. At the age of 17, Carley had once escaped from a local prison in Yates County in 1985, and as a result, he was sentenced to two to four years in jail for first-degree escape and criminal possession of stolen property. Two years after his first escape attempt, on October 15, 1987, Carley robbed and murdered gas station attendant Robert Esposito in St. Bernard Parish, a crime for which he was sentenced to life imprisonment. At the time when Carley murdered Knapps, he had already served 12 years out of his life sentence.

Joel Durham

Joel Durham (1973 — December 28, 1999), though not a member of the Angola 5, was the sixth and final inmate to join the prison escape attempt. Durham was first incarcerated for the 1992 murder of Leo Kern.

On February 8, 1992, during an armed robbery, Durham shot and murdered Leo Kern, who was a manager at a local McDonald's restaurant in Metairie. Durham was found guilty of first-degree murder and sentenced to life in prison without parole for the murder, and his appeal against his conviction was rejected by the Louisiana 5th Circuit Court of Appeal on April 16, 1996. At the time of his death in 1999, Durham had spent seven years behind bars.

== Murder trials ==
More than a decade after the murder of Captain David Knapps, the Angola 5 were put on trial in separate courts between 2011 and 2013 for their respective roles in the killing.

On May 24, 2011, Jeffrey Clark was the first to complete his trial for first-degree murder, and he was sentenced to death upon the jury's unanimous recommendation for capital punishment, thus marking the second time Clark was sent to death row after he was first condemned for the murder of Andrew Cheswick back in 1984.

Robert Carley, the ringleader of the murder and escape incident, was similarly found guilty of first-degree murder. However, the jury deadlocked on the death penalty and as a result, Carley was automatically sentenced to life imprisonment without the possibility of parole. According to two jurors of Carley's trial, most of the jurors wanted to sentence Carley to death, but they could only reach a vote of 10–2 in the end, as one of the dissenting jurors could not be persuaded, and the majority, who later apologized to the prosecution, were angered at the particular juror who voted against the death sentence.

On October 30, 2011, David Brown was sentenced to death after the jury convicted him of first-degree murder and unanimously recommended the death penalty, and he thus became the second member of the Angola 5 to be given the death penalty.

David Mathis became the fourth member of the Angola 5 to be convicted in 2012. Unlike his accomplices, Mathis reached a plea agreement with the prosecution, and as a result, the death penalty was taken off the table and Mathis was given a second life term without parole, and the judge additionally ordered that both his life sentences were to be served consecutively.

Barry Edge was the last member of the Angola 5 to stand trial in 2013. Edge was convicted of first-degree murder, but like the case of Carley, the jury failed to reach a unanimous vote for the death penalty; the overall vote was 9–3. As a result, Edge was sentenced to life without parole on October 15, 2013.

== Appeal process ==
=== Clark's appeals ===
On December 19, 2016, the Louisiana Supreme Court denied Jeffrey Clark's appeal and affirmed his conviction and sentence.

On June 28, 2019, Clark's second appeal was rejected by the Louisiana Supreme Court.

=== Brown's appeals ===
In April 2012, after he was condemned to death row, David Brown filed an appeal, seeking to overturn his conviction and sentence in favour of a new trial.

On December 16, 2014, Criminal District Court Judge Jerome Winsberg overturned the death sentence of Brown after hearing his appeal, accepting that the prosecution withheld a confession from one of Brown's accomplices, and ordered a new sentencing hearing. Two years later, on February 22, 2016, the Louisiana Supreme Court restored the death sentence of Brown.

Subsequently, Brown filed a follow-up appeal to the U.S. Supreme Court. On June 20, 2016, Brown's appeal was ultimately dismissed by the U.S. Supreme Court.

In another appeal in 2017, Brown's lawyers asked for Louisiana Supreme Court justice Scott Crichton to be recused from the case of Brown, after he was found to have made remarks about the "Angola 5" case in a radio show to express his support for capital punishment. Subsequently, Crichton voluntarily pulled himself out of the case.

In May 2021, Brown filed a second appeal to the Louisiana Supreme Court against his conviction and sentence. On January 28, 2022, the Louisiana Supreme Court rejected Brown's second appeal against his conviction and sentence.

On April 3, 2023, the U.S. Supreme Court declined to review Brown's case and dismissed his second appeal.

=== 2023 clemency bid ===
In 2023, as Louisiana Governor John Bel Edwards neared the end of his term, he publicly declared his opposition to the death penalty and called for its abolition in the state. Despite his efforts, the Louisiana legislature voted on May 24, 2023, to reject a bill that would have ended capital punishment.

The following month, in June 2023, 55 of the 56 inmates on Louisiana's death row — including David Brown and Jeffrey Clark — filed clemency petitions requesting that their death sentences be commuted to life imprisonment before Governor Edwards left office. These petitions were reviewed by the Louisiana Board of Pardons and Committee on Parole. However, in July 2023, the Board denied all 56 petitions, citing state law that requires a one-year waiting period after the conclusion of all legal appeals before clemency can be requested.

In October 2023, the Board also rejected clemency petitions from five additional death row inmates, including Antoinette Frank.

== Current status ==
After receiving death sentences, Jeffrey Clark and David Brown were transferred to death row at the Louisiana State Penitentiary. By 2023, they were among 57 inmates still awaiting execution in the state.

In February 2025, Louisiana announced plans to resume executions, ending a 15-year moratorium that had been in effect since 2010. On March 18, 2025, the state carried out its first execution in over a decade, conducting the execution of Jessie Hoffman Jr. with nitrogen hypoxia. As of the day before the execution, March 17, 2025, there were 56 inmates on death row, including Clark and Brown. Following Hoffman's execution, the number dropped to 55.

As of 2025, the remaining three members of the Angola 5 — David Mathis, Barry Edge, and Robert Carley — continued serving life sentences at the Louisiana State Penitentiary for the murder of Captain David Knapps, as well as for their earlier murder convictions. A 2019 report showed that about 4,700 offenders, including Mathis, Edge and Carley, were serving life without parole at the Louisiana State Penitentiary, making Louisiana primarily the state with the highest sentencing rate of life without parole in the United States.

== See also ==
- Capital punishment in Louisiana
- List of death row inmates in the United States § Louisiana
