= David W. J. Brown =

English cricketer (1942–2021)

Personal information
- Full name: David Wyndham James Brown
- Born: 26 February 1942; Cheltenham, Gloucestershire, England
- Died: 17 August 2021 (aged 79)
- Batting: Right-handed
- Role: Batsman

Domestic team information
- Years: Team
- 1964–1967: Gloucestershire

Career statistics
Competition	FC	List A
Matches	89	2
Runs scored	2863	78
Batting average	20.16	78.00
100s/50s	1/14	0/1
Top score	142	50*
Balls bowled	90	0
Wickets	3	–
Bowling average	28.00	–
5 wickets in innings	0	–
10 wickets in match	0	–
Best bowling	3/84	–
Catches/stumpings	36/–	0
- Source: Cricinfo, 23 August 2021

David Wyndham James Brown (26 February 1942 – 17 August 2021) was an English cricketer. He played for Gloucestershire between 1964 and 1967.

Brown was a middle-order batsman. On his first-class debut in 1964 he top-scored with a solid 50 in Gloucestershire's first innings of 139 against Surrey. He made his only first-class century against Glamorgan in 1965 when he scored 142 to avert defeat after Gloucestershire had followed on. He was Gloucestershire's top scorer with 59 in the first innings of the low-scoring match against Pakistan in 1967.
