= David Brown (footballer, born 1946) =

Australian rules footballer (born 1946)

Personal information
- Full name: David Brown
- Born: 4 September 1946 (age 80)
- Original team: Chanel College
- Height: 177 cm (5 ft 10 in)
- Weight: 78 kg (172 lb)

Playing career^{1}
Years	Club	Games (Goals)
1965–66	Geelong	10 (6)
- ^{1} Playing statistics correct to the end of 1966.

David Brown (born 4 September 1946) is a former Australian rules footballer who played with Geelong in the Victorian Football League (VFL).
