= David Brown (American artist) =

American painter

David Brown is an American contemporary artist, known for his landscapes and portraiture of his local community of Old Saybrook, Connecticut. He lives and works in what has become known as the "Hay House". It is the oldest such structure east of the Mississippi River.

Brown had a solo exhibition in November 2004 at the Florence Griswold Museum in Old Lyme, Connecticut. The exhibition featured a series of weekly landscapes of dusk and dawn from his home, a collection of portraits of people from the local community, and importantly, a set of four life size interiors of his home, the Hay House.

Brown's home is a one room cement home insulated with hay, called a 'hay house', with no electricity or running water. He has fields where he grows a variety of produce, to live on or to sell. “The message of the Hay House is ‘this is more than enough,” explains Brown. “I live better that 90% of the world’s population. My artwork is about appreciating what we have.”

Brown lived in Nepal during the 1970s, and taught art and English. Later, he worked for UNICEF and the government of India Department of Tourism as a photographer. Back in the United States, he worked as Operations Director for the Tibetan Cultural Center of Connecticut.

Brown was the subject of a documentary by Jeannie Newman, David Brown and the Hay House about his way of life.

On May 1, 2007, Brown's studio and much of his artwork was destroyed by fire. On November 4 and November 17, 2007, Brown held a public "barn raising" at his property during which the studio was re-built. The new structure is insulated with bales of hay.
