= David W. Brown =

American author

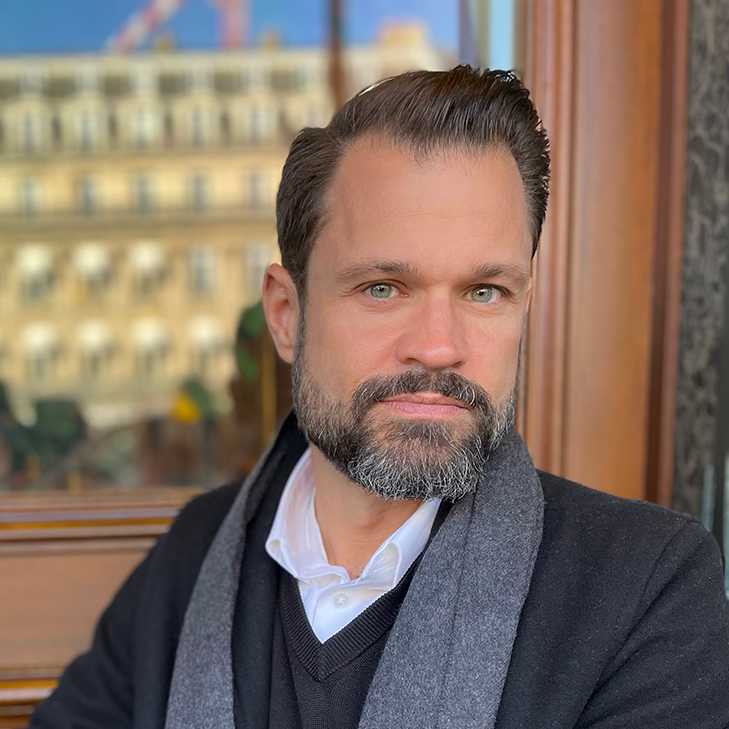
- Born: January 3, 1979; Baton Rouge, Louisiana, U.S.
- Education: University of Arkansas at Monticello (MFA); Louisiana State University (BS)
- Occupations: Writer; journalist; novelist
- Writing career
- Genres: Creative nonfiction; non-fiction; science fiction
- Subjects: Space exploration; polar exploration; climate change; wine
- Notable work: The Mission
- Notable awards: 2010 Next Generation Indie Book Award for Science Fiction
- Literary movement: New Sincerity
- Website: davidwbrown.com

David W. Brown is an American author who lives in New Orleans, Louisiana. He is a regular contributor to The New Yorker, The New York Times, and Scientific American.

== Career as an author ==
His work generally concerns space exploration and climate change. In 2016, he signed a publishing contract with HarperCollins to write a book titled The Mission, or: How a Disciple of Carl Sagan, an Ex-Motocross Racer, a Texas Tea Party Congressman, the World's Worst Typewriter Saleswoman, California Mountain People, and an Anonymous NASA Functionary Went to War with Mars, Survived an Insurgency at Saturn, Traded Blows with Washington, and Stole a Ride on an Alabama Moon Rocket to Send a Space Robot to Jupiter in Search of the Second Garden of Eden at the Bottom of an Alien Ocean Inside of an Ice World Called Europa (A True Story), about NASA's Europa exploration program. It is categorized as creative nonfiction, and was published in 2021.

Previously, he co-authored Deep State: Inside the Government Secrecy Industry and The Command: Deep Inside the President's Secret Army with The Atlantic editor Marc Ambinder. Both books were published by John Wiley & Sons. His first book, Red Planet Noir, won the 2010 Next Generation Indie Book Award for Science Fiction.

In 2019, he signed a second publishing contract with HarperCollins to write a memoir titled The Outside Cats, about two expeditions to Antarctica that he joined. He described the second expedition, to Thwaites Glacier, in an essay published in the November 28, 2022 issue of The New Yorker.

Brown is a former U.S. Army paratrooper and a veteran of Afghanistan. He holds a Master of Fine Arts in Creative Writing from University of Arkansas at Monticello and a Bachelor of Science in Computer Science from Louisiana State University.

== Published works ==
- Brown, David W. (January 26, 2021). The Mission (1st ed.). HarperCollins, New York. ISBN 978-0-0626544-2-7.
- Ambinder, Marc; Grady, D.B. (April 9, 2013). Deep State: Inside the Government Secrecy Industry (1st ed.). John Wiley & Sons, Hoboken. ISBN 978-1-118-14668-2.
- Ambinder, Marc; Grady, D.B. (February 7, 2012). The Command: Deep Inside the President's Secret Army (1st ed.). John Wiley & Sons, Hoboken. ISBN 978-1-118-34672-3.
- Grady, D.B. (December 2, 2009). Red Planet Noir (1st ed.). Brown Street Press, Lexington. ISBN 978-0-9641674-3-8.
