= David Jay Brown =

American novelist

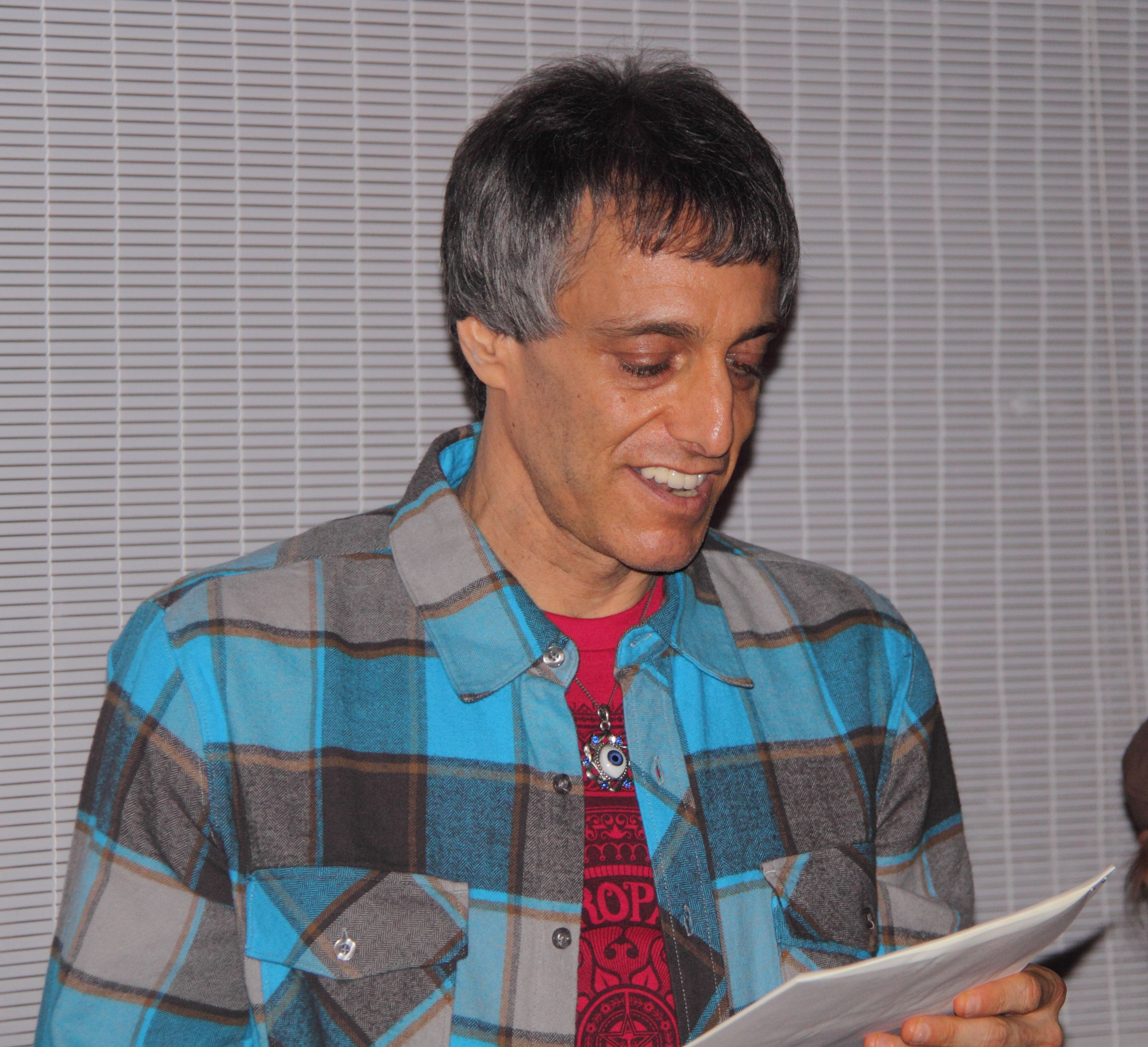
- Brown in circa 2009
- Born: 1961 (age 64–65)
- Education: B.A. University of Southern California; M.A. New York University
- Occupations: Writer; interviewer; researcher
- Website: mavericksofthemind.com

David Jay Brown (born 1961) is an American writer and interviewer. Brown has studied parapsychology and the effects of psychoactive drugs. With parapsychologist Rupert Sheldrake, he studied pets and people who apparently anticipate events. Brown has served as a guest editor for the Multidisciplinary Association for Psychedelic Studies (MAPS), and he has published many interviews of prominent thinkers.

== Education ==
Brown earned a bachelor's degree in psychology from the University of Southern California (USC) in 1983. At New York University in 1986, Brown earned a master's degree in psychobiology. At USC, he assisted with research in a doctoral program for behavioral neuroscience.

== Anticipatory behavior ==
For Rupert Sheldrake's book Dogs That Know When Their Owners Are Coming Home, Brown researched reports of animals anticipating earthquakes. Summarizing this research, Brown wrote "Etho-Geological Forecasting", which was published by Oxford University. Brown subsequently appeared on television programs about unusual animals: "Extraordinary Cats" for PBS Nature, and the "Psychic Animals" episode of Animal X for the BBC and the Discovery Channel.

Sheldrake and Brown co-authored a paper titled "The Anticipation of Telephone Calls: A Survey in California", published in the Journal of Parapsychology in 2001.

== Interviews ==
Brown has interviewed psychedelic artist Alex Grey, Jacob Teitelbaum and John C. Lilly; a collection of interviews was published in 1993 as Mavericks of the Mind. A second collection was published two years later as Voices from the Edge. Brown was also interviewed on the Comsic Echo Podcast discussing his book Dreaming Wide Awake.

Brown's Conversations on the Edge of the Apocalypse was published in 2005, containing interviews with political scientist Noam Chomsky, comedian George Carlin, alternative medicine expert Deepak Chopra and others.

In 2007, Brown published Mavericks of Medicine which presented 22 interviews with doctors and biomedical researchers holding an unconventional stance on medicine. These interviews included viewpoints from Andrew Weil, Jack Kevorkian, Bernie Siegel and Ray Kurzweil.

In turn, Brown was interviewed in July 2012 for R. U. Sirius's counter-cultural technology website "Acceler8or". Brown said he met author Robert Anton Wilson in the 1980s and asked him to write a blurb for a science fiction book Brown was working on; this resulted in Wilson writing an 11-page foreword for Brown's first published fiction: Brainchild (1988).

== Psychoactive drugs ==
Brown has experimented on himself with psychoactive drugs, including the anesthetic ketamine. He appeared on The Montel Williams Show in the early 1990s to defend the use of nootropic substances popularly known as "smart drugs". Brown said Montel Williams did not want to hear about any notional "smart" use of drugs and instead warned his viewers against methamphetamines.

Brown claims that MDMA, an illegal psychoactive drug popularly known as "ecstasy", may be a useful treatment for posttraumatic stress disorder (PTSD). Brown wrote in Discover in 2009 and in Scientific American in 2010 that a study by Michael and Annie Mithoefer showed potential for mitigating the suffering of chronic PTSD.

== Lucid Dreaming ==
Brown is the author of a popular book on lucid dreaming, Dreaming Wide Awake: Lucid Dreaming, Psychedelics, and Shamanic Healing, and has been interviewed widely on the subject. He has appeared on numerous podcasts and radio shows talking about lucid dreaming—such as George Noory's Coast to Coast AM, "Dreamland" with Whitley Strieber, and Gaia TV's show "Open Minds" with Regina Meredith—and his work was profiled by Maria Grusauskas in the Santa Cruz Good Times and in High Times Magazine.

== Personal life ==
Brown lives in Ben Lomond, California, in Santa Cruz County, where he was named the "Best Author" of 2012 by Santa Cruz Weekly. With sex educator Annie Sprinkle, Brown has taught workshops about the effects of drugs on sex.

According to Andrew Leonard, writing in Salon magazine, Brown's Wikipedia article was one of those targeted by Robert Clark Young, a novelist who used Wikipedia to attack people involved in the pagan community or pagan related events.

== Writing ==
- 1988 – Brainchild. New Falcon. ISBN 9780941404921
- 1992 – "Critique Interview" (with Rebecca McClen), in Terence McKenna's The Archaic Revival. HarperCollins. ISBN 9780062506139
- 1993 – Mavericks of the Mind. Crossing Press. ISBN 978-0895946010
- 1995 – Voices from the Edge. Crossing Press. ISBN 978-0895947321
- 1999 – Virus: The Alien Strain. New Falcon. ISBN 9781561841448
- 2001 – "The Anticipation of Telephone Calls: A Survey in California", Journal of Parapsychology, volume 65, pages 145–156 (with Rupert Sheldrake)
- 2005 – Conversations on the Edge of the Apocalypse: Contemplating the Future with Noam Chomsky, George Carlin, Deepak Chopra, Rupert Sheldrake, and Others. Palgrave/Macmillan. ISBN 9781403965325
- 2007 – Mavericks of Medicine: Conversations on the Frontiers of Medical Research. Smart Publications. ISBN 9781890572198
- 2007 – Detox with Oral Chelation: Protecting Yourself from Lead, Mercury, & Other Environmental Toxins (with Garry Gordon, M.D.) - Smart Publications ISBN 978-1890572204
- 2013 – The New Science of Psychedelics: At the Nexus of Culture, Consciousness, and Spirituality. Inner Traditions/Bear. ISBN 9781594774928
- 2015 – Frontiers of Psychedelic Consciousness: Conversations with Albert Hofmann, Stanislav Grof, Rick Strassman, Jeremy Narby, Simon Posford, and Others. Inner Traditions/Bear. ISBN 978-1620553923
- 2016 – Dreaming Wide Awake: Lucid Dreaming, Shamanic Healing, and Psychedelics. Inner Traditions/Bear. ISBN 978-1620554890
- 2018 – Women of Visionary Art. Inner Traditions/Bear. ISBN 978-1620556931
