= Murray Brown (economist) =

Canadian economist

Murray George Brown (born 10 November 1936) is a full professor (retired) at Dalhousie University. The Dalhouse University credits Murray Brown with over 50 refereed journals, conference abstracts, proceedings, and major reports. Brown holds post-retirement appointments in the College of Pharmacy and the Department of Community Health and Epidemiology at Dalhousie University.

== Education ==
- 1961 B.A. (honours) in Economics from the University of Western Ontario
- 1962 M.A. in economics from Queen's University
- 1968 A.M. in Economics from the University of Chicago
- 1974 Ph.D. in economics from the University of Chicago

== Awards ==
- Leave Fellowship from Social Sciences and Humanities Research Council of Canada in 1979
- Doctoral Research Fellowship for Centre for Health Administration Studies from University of Chicago in 1971-73
- Canada Council Doctoral Fellowship in 1967
- Tuition Fellowship from University of Chicago in 1967
- Canada Council Pre-Doctoral Fellowship (Queen's) in 1961
- Edward Blake Scholarship for Honours in Economics from University of Western Ontario in 1960
