= David Brown (geneticist) =

American scientist

- Born: 1968; Tyler, Texas

David Brown (born 1968) is an American scientist best known for his work in the field of microRNA (miRNA). He was the Director of Drug Discovery and in vivo Research at Mirna Therapeutics, now retired. He previously held the position of director of R&D at Asuragen, a therapeutic and diagnostics company focusing on RNA. He has worked on let-7 miRNA expression in normal lung tissue and in lung cancer cells.
