= David Brown (pharmacologist) =

British pharmacologist (1936–2023)

David Anthony Brown, FRS FBPhS (10 February 1936 — 21 October 2023) was a British pharmacologist. He was emeritus Professor of Pharmacology at University College London, having joined the department in April 1987 and served as Head of Department from October 1987 to April 2002. He is known for the discovery of the M current in the 1970s.

== Education ==
Brown graduated from University College with a BSc degree in Chemistry, Zoology and Physiology, followed by Special Physiology, and from St Bartholomew's Hospital Medical College with a PhD in pharmacology.

== Career and research ==
Prior to joining UCL Brown was Wellcome Professor of Pharmacology at the School of Pharmacy. He also held visiting professorships in the Universities of Chicago, Iowa and Texas, and the University of Kanazawa (Japan), and was a Fogarty Scholar-in-Residence at the National Institutes of Health in the United States.

His publications are widespread and well known, having had his work published in prominent journals such as the British Journal of Pharmacology and the Journal of Neuroscience. He was editor-in-chief of the British Journal of Pharmacology, and served on the editorial boards of many other journals, including the Journal of Physiology, Neuron, Trends in Neurosciences and Proceedings of the Royal Society.

== Awards and honours ==
Brown was elected a Fellow of the Royal Society in 1990, an Honorary Fellow and sometime Council Member of the British Pharmacological Society, an Elected Fellow of the Institute of Biology (1980) and an Elected Fellow of Academia Europaea (1996). He won the Feldberg Foundation Prize in 1992.
