= Vonnoh =

Vonnoh is a surname. Notable people with the surname include:

- Bessie Potter Vonnoh (1872–1955), American sculptor
- Robert Vonnoh (1858–1933), American painter, first husband of Bessie
