= Tashjian =

Tashjian is a surname. Notable people with the surname include:

- Elizabeth Tashjian (1912–2007), American artist
- Fleur Tashjian, British child actress
- Janet Tashjian (born 1956), American writer
- Julia Tashjian (1938–2013), American politician
- Stephen Tashjian (born 1959), American artist
