= Bessie Potter =

Bessie Potter can refer to:

- Bessie Potter (1872–1955), American sculptor better known as Bessie Potter Vonnoh
- Bessie Potter, fictional character on television series Dawson's Creek
