= Watch Rock Park =

Park in New London County, Connecticut

Coordinates: 41.3031°N 72.3294°W

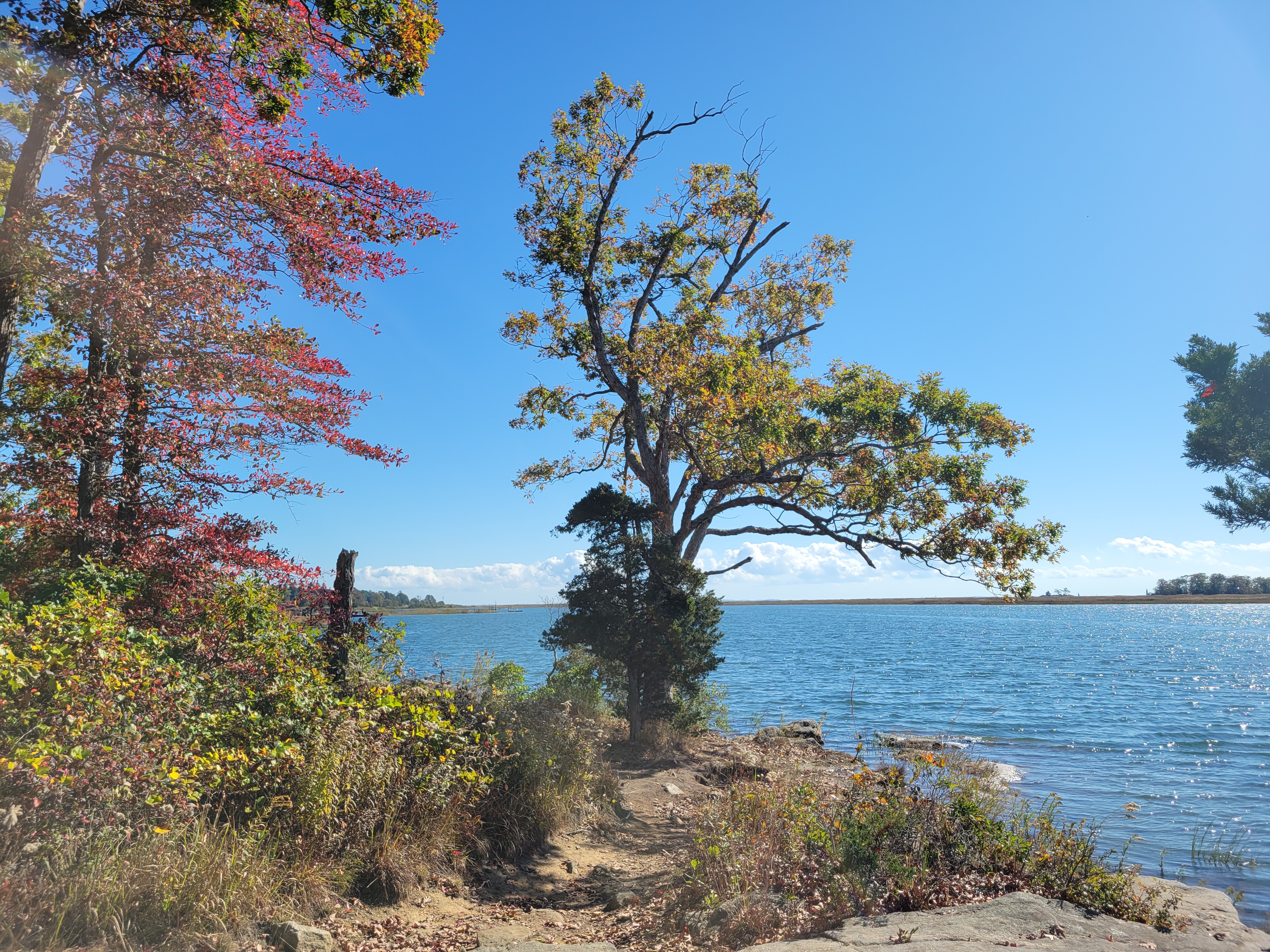
Tree in Watch Rock Park

Watch Rock Park is a 25-acre park in Old Lyme, Connecticut owned by the Old Lyme Conservation Trust. It is located off Joel Road at the point where the Duck River (Connecticut) flows into the Connecticut River, just above the point where the Connecticut flows into Long Island Sound.
