= Duck River Cemetery =

Cemetery in Old Lyme, Connecticut, US

Coordinates: 41.3110°N 72.3276°W

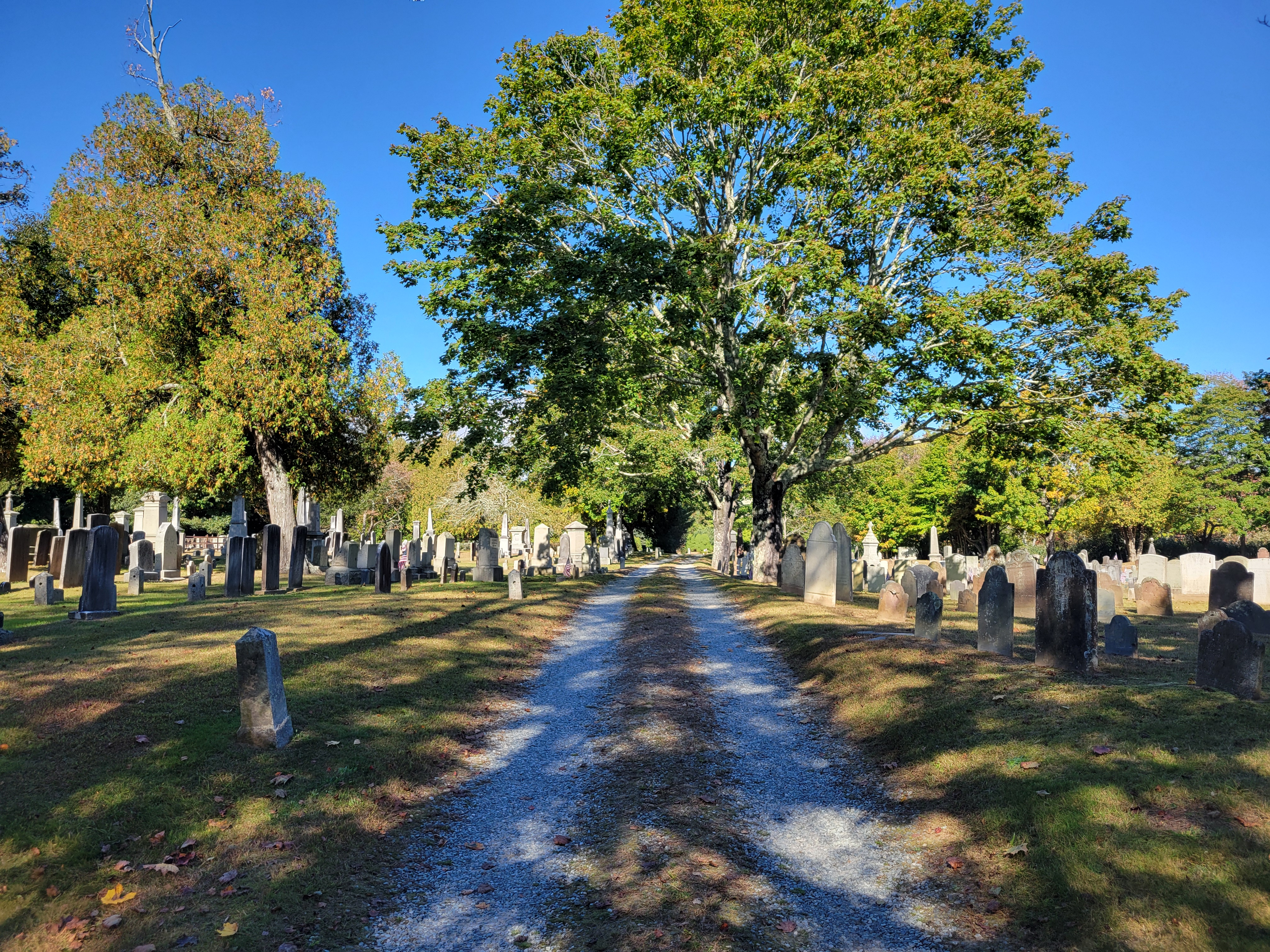
Duck River Cemetery

The Duck River Cemetery, also known as the Old Lyme Cemetery, is the communal burying ground of the town of Old Lyme, Connecticut. The earliest surviving grave marker dates from 1676 and was carved by William Stanclift, Renold Marvin's gravestone. The Stanclift shop remained popular into the 1740s carving both headstones and table slab monuments. Wealthy customers also opted for stones carved and imported by the skilled carvers of Boston and Newport including The John Stevens Shop, Hans Christian Geyer, and John Homer, the latter two of Boston. Brownstone carvers of the Connecticut River Valley include those by the Thomas Johnson Shop, William Holland, Ebenezer Drake, John Johnson, John Isham, and David Miller. Two Eastern Connecticut schist markers by John Hartshorne and Josiah Manning are also present. By the dawn of the 19th century, Chester Kimball of New London, Connecticut, Charles Dolph, and later the Ritter Shop of New Haven, Connecticut were carving in the neoclassical urn and willow style, also shifting into marble. A tidal stream known as the Duck River and a salt marsh bisect the burying ground.

== Notable burials ==
Notable people buried at the Duck River Cemetery include:

- Thomas R. Ball (1896–1943), Connecticut Congressman
- Charles Chadwick (1874–1953), author
- Elsie Ferguson (1885–1961), stage and film actress
- Matthew Griswold (1714–1799) American Patriot, state governor
- Peter Karter (1922–2010), recycling pioneer and nuclear engineer
- Ezra Lee (1749–1821), Colonial soldier, best known for commanding the Turtle submarine
- Roger Tory Peterson (1908-1996), naturalist, ornithologist, artist, educator, and a founder of the environmental movement
- Bessie Potter Vonnoh (1872–1955), sculptor
- Robert Vonnoh (1858–1933), American Impressionist painter
