= Old Lyme Historic District =

- U.S. National Register of Historic Places
- U.S. Historic district
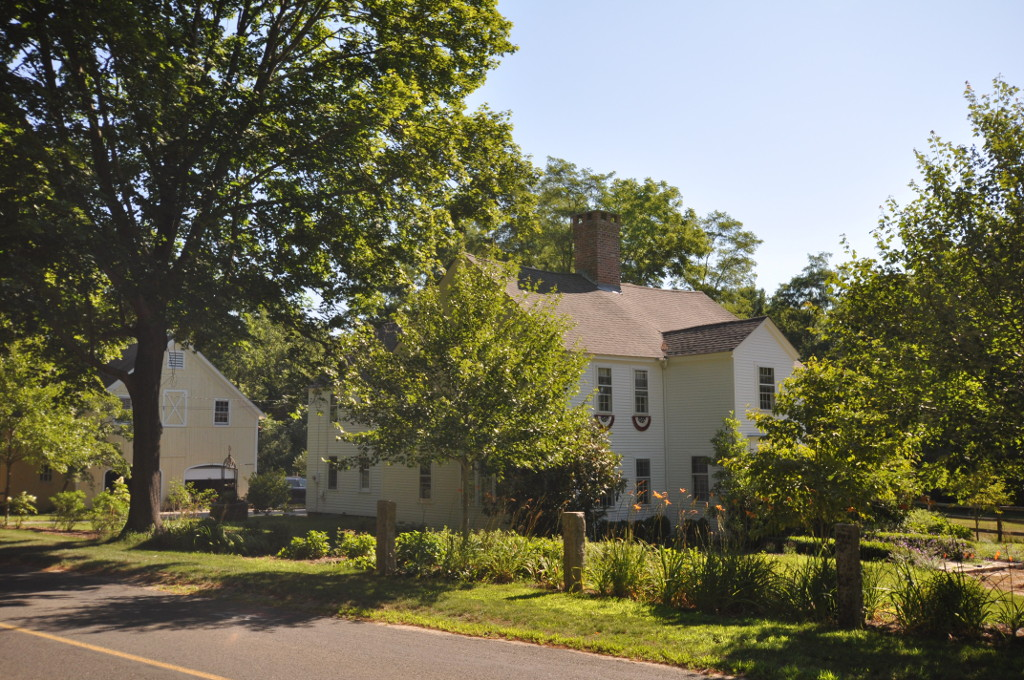
- The Peck Tavern

- Location within Connecticut Location within the United States
- Location: Lyme Street from Shore Road to Sill Lane, Old Boston Post Road from Sill Lane to Rose Lane, Old Lyme, Connecticut
- Coordinates: 41°19′18″N 72°19′40″W
- Area: 109 acres (44 ha)
- Architect: Multiple
- Architectural style: Mid 19th Century Revival
- NRHP reference No.: 71000916
- Added to NRHP: October 14, 1971

The Old Lyme Historic District encompasses the historic village center of Old Lyme, Connecticut. Located mainly on Lyme Street south of Interstate 95, the village, settled in the mid-17th century, has an architectural history dating to the early 18th century, flourishing as a shipbuilding center and home to many ship captains. It was listed on the National Register of Historic Places in 1971.

== Description and history ==
Old Lyme was one of the early settlement areas of the Puritan Saybrook Colony in the 17th century, and was the early town center of Lyme. It separated from that community as South Lyme in 1855, and eventually renamed itself Old Lyme. The village center has since the early days been arrayed along what is now called Lyme Street, which runs parallel to the Lieutenant River shortly before its mouth at the Connecticut River. The village flourished in the 18th and 19th centuries as a shipbuilding center, and was home to the Old Lyme Art Colony in the late 19th century. The artistic legacy is continued by the presence of the Lyme Art Association and the Lyme Academy College of Fine Arts in the village.

The historic district extends along Lyme Street, roughly from the junction with I-95 southward to McCurdy Street, and then a short way along that roadway. It also includes a few buildings north of I-95, including the Old Lyme Inn and the Florence Griswold House and Museum, the historic center of the art colony. The town's civic buildings are located in the village, including the town hall and library. Houses in the district range across the architectural spectrum from the early 18th century to the late 19th century, and including the Peck Tavern on Sill Lane, an 18th-century tavern that is now a private residence.

== See also ==
- National Register of Historic Places listings in New London County, Connecticut
