= Bennett Rockshelter =

Archaeological site in Connecticut

- U.S. National Register of Historic Places
- Nearest city: Old Lyme, Connecticut
- NRHP reference No.: 87001223
- Added to NRHP: July 31, 1987

The Bennett Rockshelter is a prehistoric archaeological site in Old Lyme, Connecticut. It was added to the U.S. National Register of Historical Places in July 1987. The site is located on privately owned woodland.

== See also ==
- National Register of Historic Places listings in New London County, Connecticut
