= Edward Charles Volkert =

American painter

- Born: September 19, 1871; Cincinnati, Ohio, US
- Died: March 4, 1935 (aged 63); Old Lyme, Connecticut, US
- Resting place: Spring Grove Cemetery
- Education: Art Academy of Cincinnati, Art Students League of New York
- Known for: Painting, Landscape art
- Style: American Impressionism

Edward Charles Volkert (1871–1935) was an American Impressionist artist best known for his colorful and richly painted impressionist landscapes. His trademark subject was that of cattle and plowmen. His style is noted for its impressionist use of light, applied in small dots of paint, while maintaining an interest in the true forms and colors of his subject matter. He has been referred to as America's cattle painter extraordinaire".

== Early life and education ==
The son of Phillip Volkert, a hat merchant from Alsace, and Catherine Dair, Volkert was born in Cincinnati, Ohio, in 1871. He studied at the Art Academy of Cincinnati under Frank Duveneck, whose draftsmanship would influence Volkert. His mature style combined elements of the Barbizon school of painting and impressionism. Academic institutions he attended were Art Students League of New York and Art Academy of Cincinnati. He also studied under George de Forest Brush, Henry Siddons Mowbray, and William Merritt Chase.

== Career in Ohio and New York ==
Volkert was originally a portraitist, but ceased painting portraits after his marriage ended in divorce. For many years he traveled between Cincinnati and New York City, and most preferred to paint cattle in Ohio farmlands. While living in New York, Volkert was president of the Bronx Art Guild. Other Association and Club Memberships included the American Federation of Arts, the National Academy of Design, National Arts Club, New York Watercolor Society, Paint and Clay Club, Duveneck Society of Cincinnati and the Salmagundi Club.

== Later life in Connecticut ==
After staying in Old Lyme, Connecticut, as a guest of Florence Griswold, he eventually moved near Old Lyme in part because of his interest in painting their ever-present oxen, which Volkert described as "twice as good as cows at posing ... oxen are always ready to stand still, but cows are more inquisitive and when a newcomer appears they forsake their quiet rumination and come over to investigate." When Florence Griswold became the first manager of the Lyme Art Association's gallery, when it opened in 1921, Edward Charles Volkert became the first Secretary. Thereafter, Volkert bought a home there in 1922, and remained in Old Lyme for the rest of his life, where he continued to work at his subject of choice.

== Personal life ==
Volkert married Jessica Willis in 1897. The couple had two children, Robert and Ruth born in 1898 and 1899 respectively. They divorced in 1907, with Edward taking custody of Robert and Jessica taking custody of Ruth. Edward attempted to regain custody of his daughter, but was cut off from contact with her for the next decade. Ruth died unexpectedly from diabetes in 1933, after which Edward did not paint again. He became ill from uremic poisoning and was admitted into a Christian Scientist nursing home in Columbus, Ohio, where he died on March 4, 1935, and was buried in Cincinnati.

Volkert's sister Clara also became a professional artist.

== Collections ==
The Mary Ran Gallery in Cincinnati, Ohio is compiling a catalogue raisonné of Volkert's work. The Florence Griswold Museum holds a number of his works. His papers are held by the Archives of American Art at the Smithsonian Some of his illustrations of fungi are held by the Archives of the New York Botanical Garden in the William Murrill collection. A number of these illustrations were used in Murrill's "Illustrations of Fungi" series, published between 1909 and 1922 in Mycologia, and viewable in the Biodiversity Heritage Library.

== Gallery ==
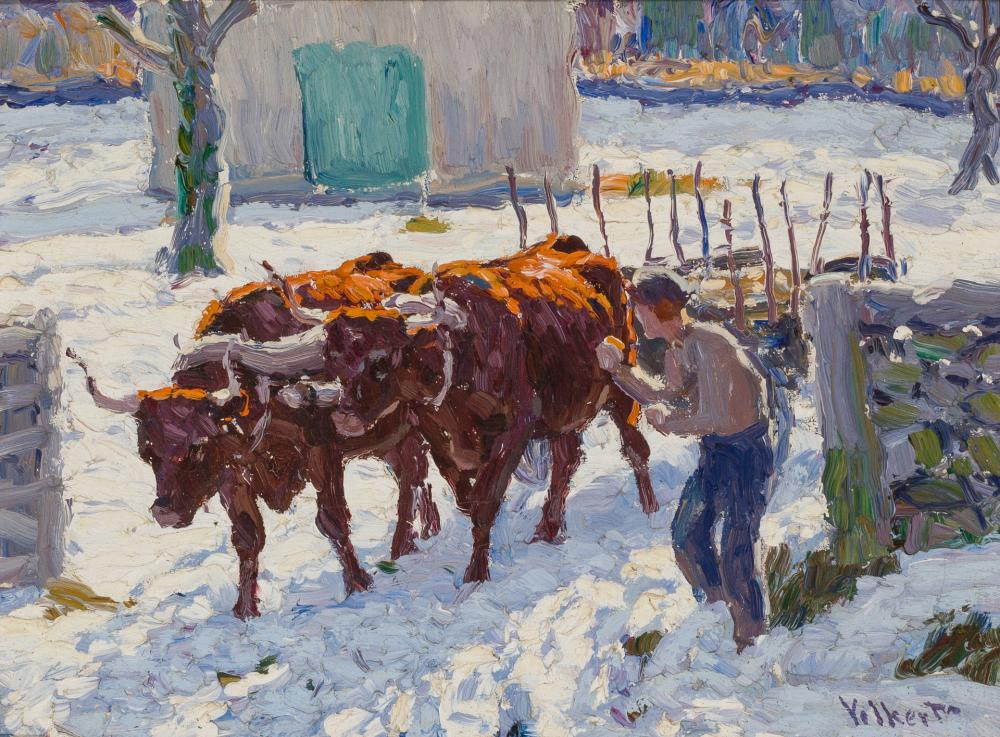

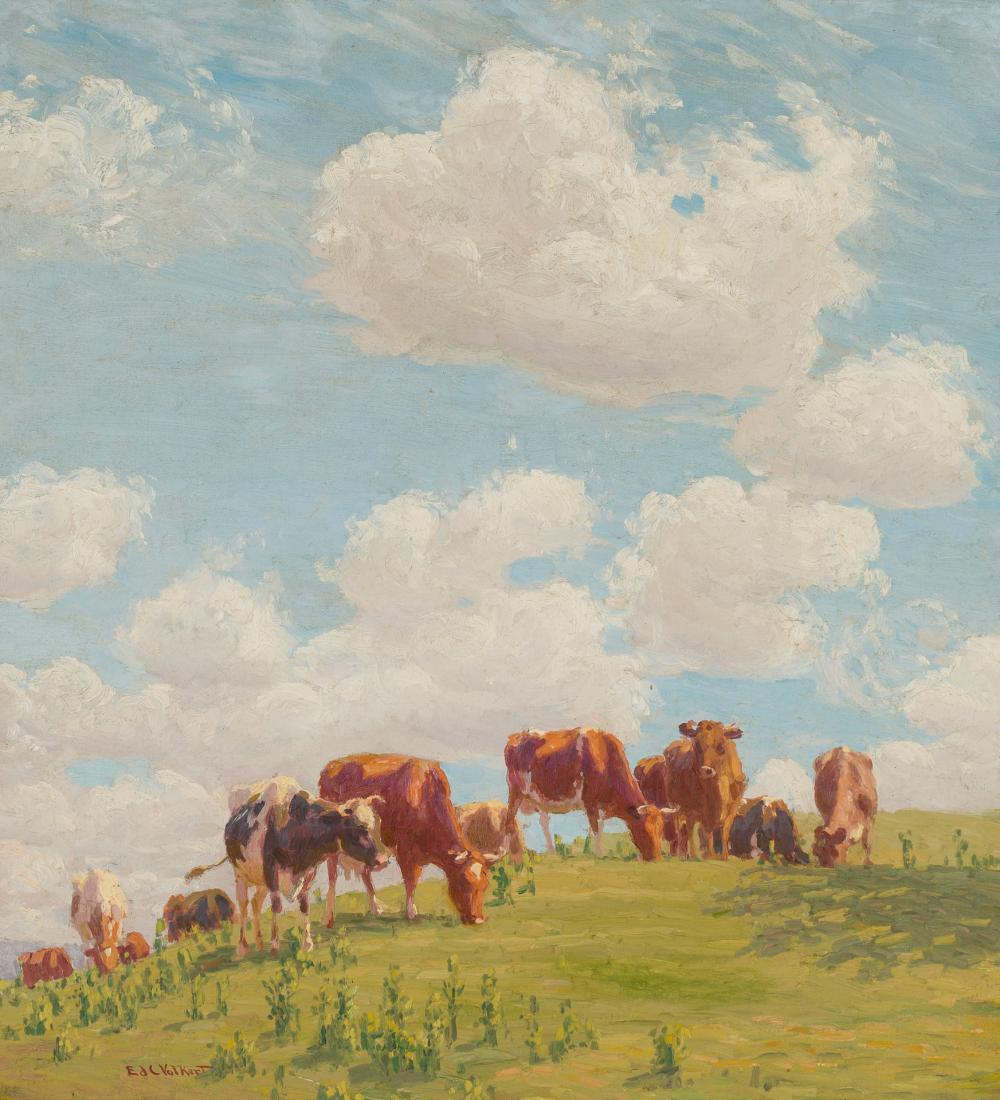

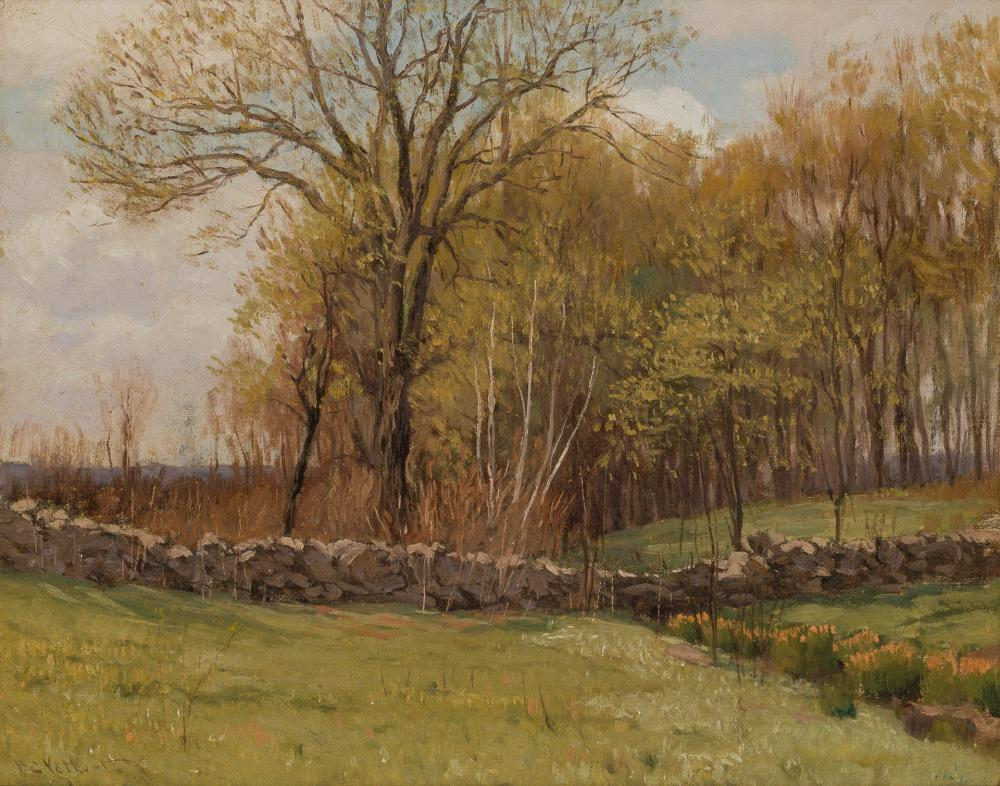
