= Duck River (Connecticut) =

Stream in the U.S. state of Connecticut

Coordinates: 41°18′30″N 72°19′44″W

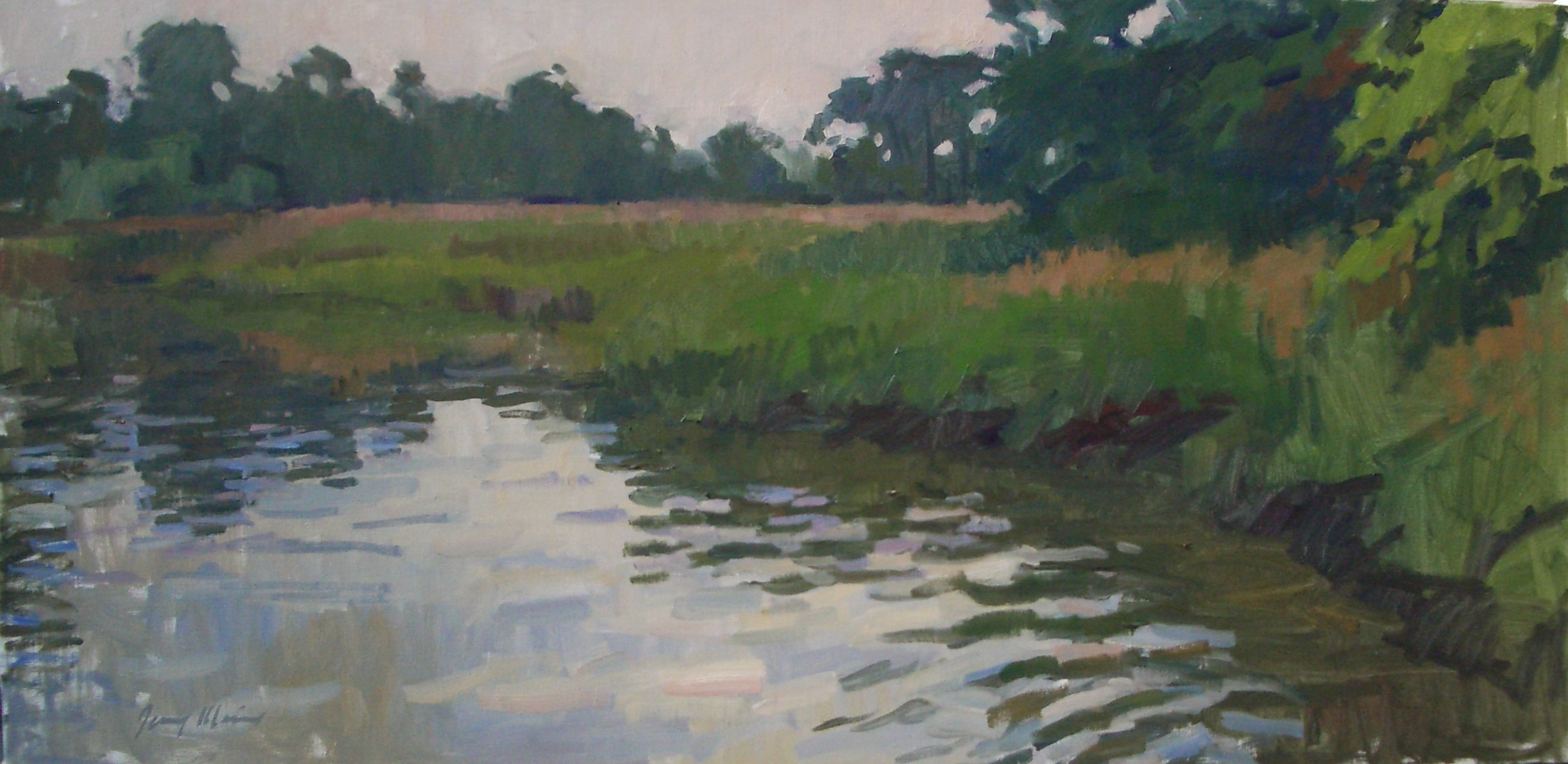
Duck Riverby Jerry Weiss, 2004

The Duck River is a short, partly tidal stream in Old Lyme, Connecticut. It joins the Connecticut River in the estuary at Watch Rock Park, just above the point where the Connecticut flows into Long Island Sound.

The river bisects the Old Lyme Cemetery.

The Duck River is popular among artists and photographers.

== See also ==
- List of rivers of Connecticut
