= Robert Vonnoh =

American painter (1858–1933)

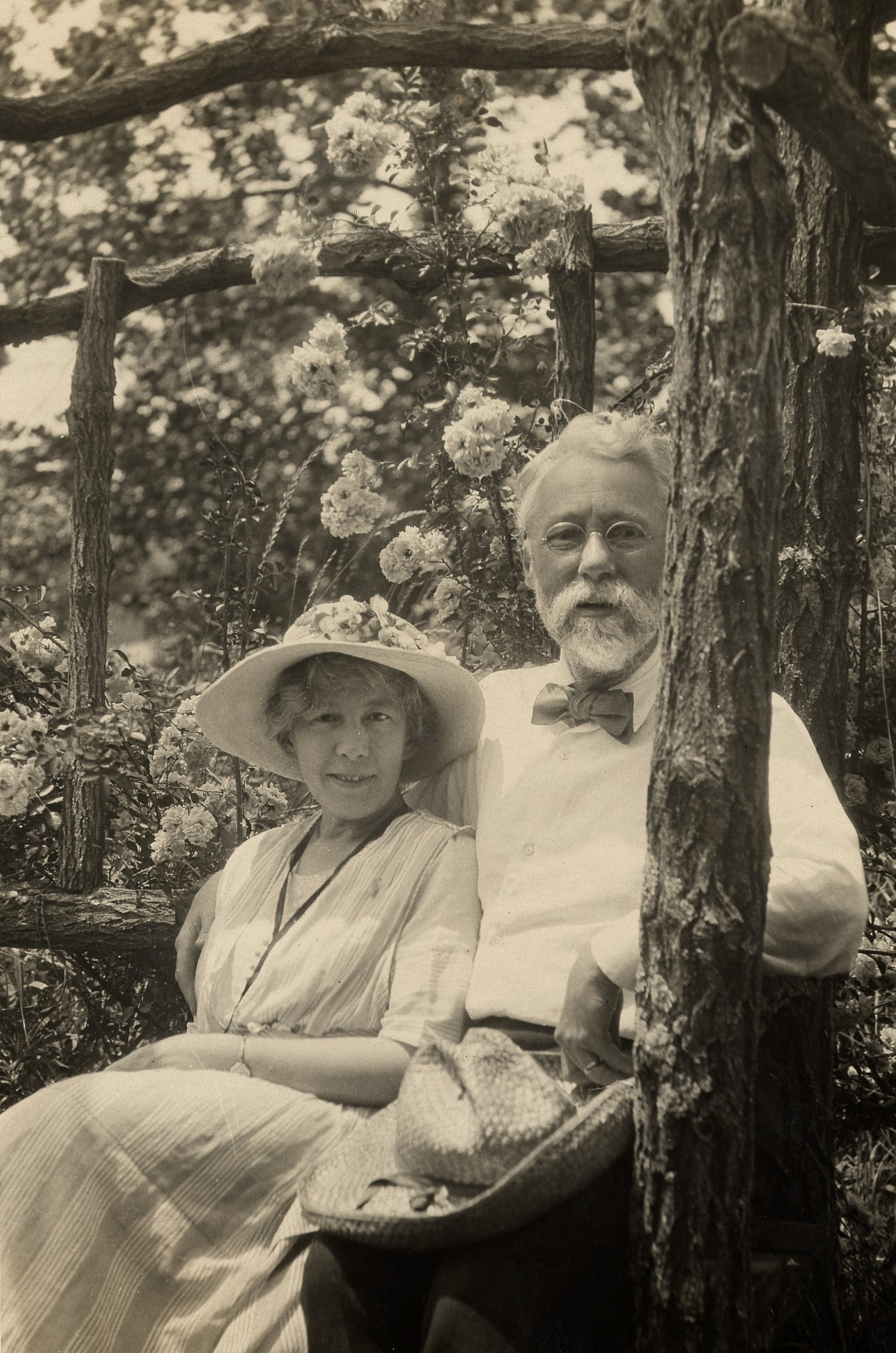
Bessie Potter and Robert Vonnoh, 1930

Robert William Vonnoh (September 17, 1858 – December 28, 1933) was an American Impressionist painter known for his portraits and landscapes. He traveled extensively between the American East Coast and France, more specifically the artists colony at Grez-sur-Loing.

== Biography ==
Robert William Vonnoh was born on 17 September 1858 in Hartford, Connecticut. He studied in Boston at the Massachusetts Normal Art School now called Massachusetts College of Art and Design, then in Paris at the Académie Julian under Gustave Boulanger and Jules Joseph Lefebvre.

He taught at the Massachusetts Normal Art School (1879–1881), at the Cowles Art School in Boston (1884–1885), at the School of the Museum of Fine Arts, Boston (1883–1887), and at the Pennsylvania Academy of the Fine Arts (1891–1896). Vonnoh became a member of the National Academy of Design in 1906.

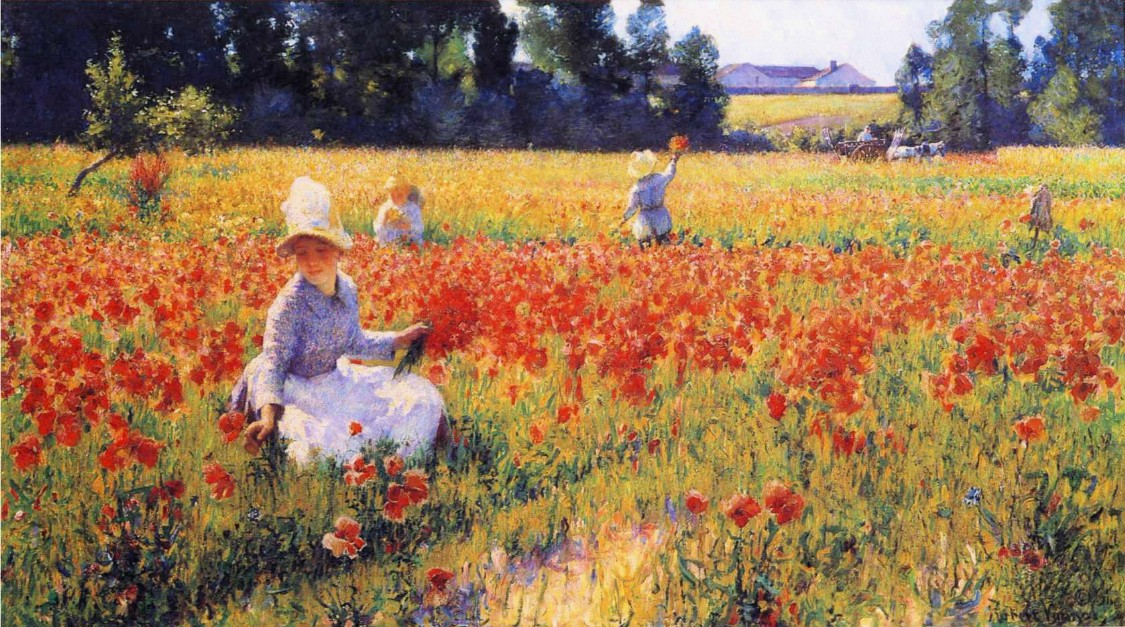
In Flanders Field (Coquelicots) by Robert Vonnoh, 1890

His most well-known work In Flanders Field (also known as Where Soldiers Sleep and Poppies Grow or Coquelicots) was painted in 1890 in the fields of Grez-sur-Loing. This large oil on canvas, 59 x 104 inches, employed active and expressive brushstrokes to evoke the fiery cadmium red of poppies, a subject matter that was popular during that time among many painters. A young woman crouches in the foreground, settling down to pick poppies in a vast field with two figures in the background. Although this was considered Vonnoh's most ambitious work, garnering great acclaim at fairs and exhibits, the painting never sold. It was not until 1919 when it was purchased directly by Joseph G. Butler Jr., founder of the Butler Institute of American Art, that In Flanders Field would find a permanent home. The painting is part of the permanent collection to this day in Youngstown, Ohio.

In the 1900s, Vonnoh also helped develop several buildings in the West 67th Street Artists' Colony in New York City.

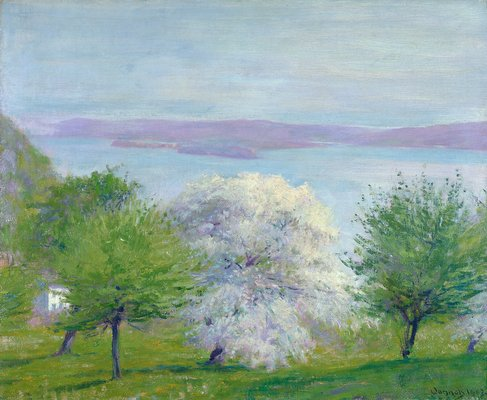
Apple bloom by Robert Vonnoh, 1903

A retrospective exhibit of his works was displayed at Madron Gallery in Chicago and The Butler Institute, March 1 to April 9, 2010 and May 2 to June 27, 2010, respectively. The show included photographs of the artists' colony in Grez-sur-Loing along with accompanying images of the artist as well as a bronze relief made by his wife, the sculptor, Bessie Potter Vonnoh (1872–1955). The show was curated by Yen Azzaro and a catalogue was written by Wendy Greenhouse, PhD. His paintings belong to collections at the Metropolitan Museum of Art, Pennsylvania Academy of the Fine Arts, Indianapolis Museum of Art, and the Art Institute of Chicago among many others. While Vonnoh never became a household name, he is cited for his experimental style within the world of American Impressionism.

== Death ==
Vonnoh died on 28 December 1933 in Nice and is buried alongside his wife in the Duck River Cemetery in Old Lyme, Connecticut.
