= Peck Tavern =

- U.S. National Register of Historic Places
- U.S. Historic district – Contributing property
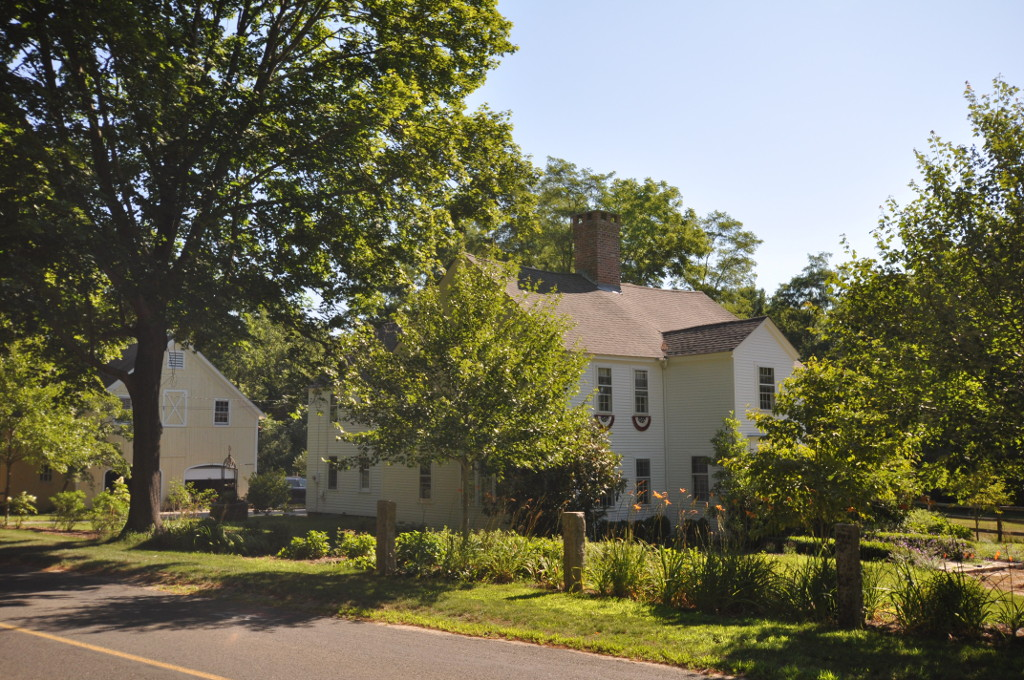

- Location within Connecticut Location within the United States
- Location: 1 Sill Lane, Old Lyme, Connecticut
- Coordinates: 41°19′49″N 72°19′28″W
- Area: 3 acres (1.2 ha)
- Built: 1769
- Part of: Old Lyme Historic District (ID71000916)
- NRHP reference No.: 82004380

Significant dates
- Added to NRHP: April 12, 1982
- Designated CP: October 14, 1971

The Peck Tavern is a historic tavern (now a private residence) at 1 Sill Lane in Old Lyme, Connecticut. With a construction history that may date to the 17th century, it is one of the town's oldest buildings, and was an important local meeting place in the 18th century. The building was listed on the National Register of Historic Places on April 12, 1982.

== Description and history ==
The Peck Tavern is located at the northern end of Old Lyme's historic village center, at center of the triangular junction of Sill Lane and Boston Post Road (U.S. Route 1). It is a 2 1/2-story wood-frame structure, with a side-gable roof, wooden clapboard siding, and a large wing extending to the rear. The main (south-facing) facade is five bays wide, with the center bay consisting of a two-story gable-topped projecting section. The main entry is in this section, flanked by fluted pilasters and topped by a transom window. Among the building's unique interior features are a surviving taproom from its use as a tavern, with the original 18th-century sign on display there.

The building's construction date is unknown, but is believed to date to the first half of the 18th century, and may incorporate elements of a 17th-century structure which was known to stand hear about 1680. The main block probably achieved its present form about 1769, when the property was purchased by John Peck. John McCurdy one of Lyme's wealthiest citizens ran a shop in the tavern which was also the center of the Son's of Liberty in the years leading up to the American Revolution. George Washington was a visitor here in April 1776 en route to New York from Boston and was seen "dancing the night away" in the 2nd floor ballroom of the Tavern. The property was used as a tavern into the early 19th century, serving as a major stop on the early post road, which was later upgrade to a turnpike and saw a great deal of traffic. The house remained in the Peck family until 1904, and was again owned by a single family until 1978, serving for a time as the headquarters of the Old Lyme Guild, a local craft society. https://florencegriswoldmuseum.org/exhibition-notes-george-washingtons-visit-to-old-lyme/

== See also ==
- National Register of Historic Places listings in New London County, Connecticut
