= Springbank (Old Lyme, Connecticut) =

Historic house in Connecticut, United States

- U.S. National Register of Historic Places
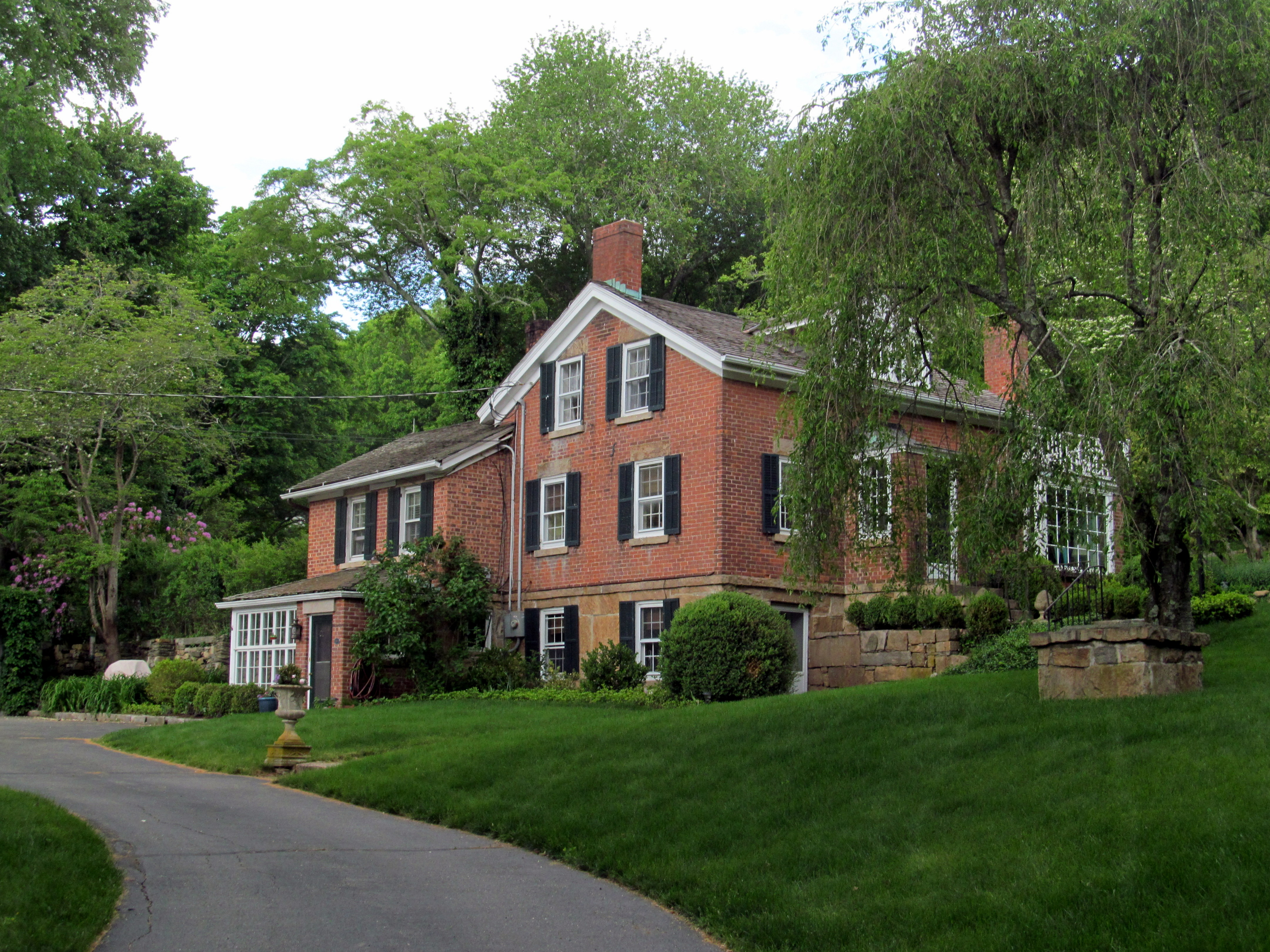
- Springbank in 2014

- Location within Connecticut Location within the United States
- Location: 69 Neck Road, Old Lyme, Connecticut
- Coordinates: 41°19′54″N 72°20′16″W
- Area: 1 acre (0.40 ha)
- Built: 1730; 1844; 1936
- Architect: Coffin, Marian Cruger; Carter, Robert I.
- Architectural style: Greek Revival, Colonial Revival
- NRHP reference No.: 01000880
- Added to NRHP: August 17, 2001

Springbank is a historic country estate at 69 Neck Road in Old Lyme, Connecticut. Built upon a small core structure dating from around 1730, the main house consists of an 1844 Greek Revival brick structure, to which a number of Colonial Revival additions and alterations were made between about 1930 and 1945. The property also includes formal gardens designed by landscape architect Marian Cruger Coffin. The property is notable as a well-documented and preserved smaller-scale example of her work. The property was listed on the National Register of Historic Places on August 17, 2001.

== Description and history ==
Springbank is located in a rural residential area on the east side of Neck Road (Connecticut Route 156), a short way north of its junction with Talcott Farm Road. A short entrance drive provides access to a parking area and garage, which are set near the road, with the house behind the parking area. The formal gardens are arranged in terraces to the north of the house and east of the garage. The house is a 2 1/2-story brick building, the product of an evolutionary construction history with multiple gables and roof lines. Its principal facade faces south, with a projecting entrance vestibule flanked by sash windows, with a larger picture window extending the facade to the right. It is set on a stone foundation that is exposed in front of the parking area due to the sloping terrain, with secondary entrances into that level.

The house was built in 1844 by Thomas Pilgrim, owner of a landing on the nearby Connecticut River, who promptly sold it. It was owned by a succession of lower-middle class owners through 1928. It was bought by Katherine Talcott, a member of the Old Saybrook Garden Club, who probably added the garage and may have begun landscaping the property. The next owners, Arthur and Gertrude Wild, bought the property in 1935, and retained Robert Carter, a local architect, to design a major Colonial Revival restyling of the house. They also retained Marian Cruger Coffin to develop the gardens around Carter's design. Coffin's design is essentially a small-scale version of work she typically did for much larger country estates.

== See also ==
- National Register of Historic Places listings in New London County, Connecticut
