= Bessie Potter Vonnoh =

American sculptor (1872–1955)

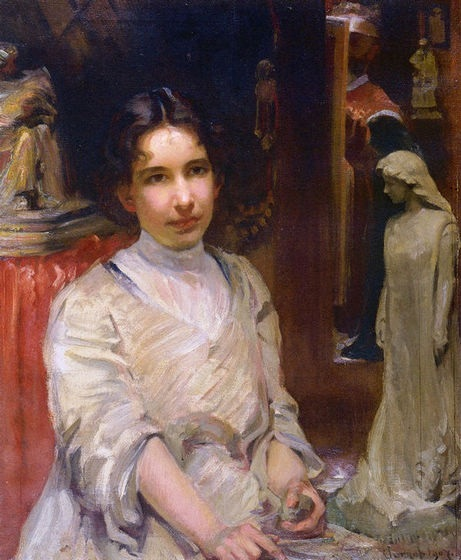
- Portrait by Robert Vonnoh, 1907
- Born: Bessie Onahotema Potter; August 17, 1872; St. Louis, Missouri
- Died: March 8, 1955 (aged 82); New York City, New York
- Known for: Sculpture
- Spouse(s): Robert Vonnoh (1899–1933, until his death); Edward L. Keyes (1948–1949, until his death)
- Elected: National Academy of Design (1921); American Academy of Arts and Letters (1931)

Bessie Potter Vonnoh (August 17, 1872 – March 8, 1955) was an American sculptor best known for her small bronzes, mostly of domestic scenes, and for her garden fountains. Her stated artistic objective, as she told an interviewer in 1925, was to “look for beauty in the everyday world, to catch the joy and swing of modern American life.”

== Early years ==
Bessie Onahotema Potter was born in St Louis, Missouri, the only child of Ohio natives Alexander and Mary McKenney Potter. Her father died in an accident in 1874 at the age of 38. By 1877, she and her mother had joined members of her mother's family in Chicago.

In school, she enjoyed clay-modeling class and decided early on that she wanted to be a sculptor. In 1886, at age 14, she enrolled in classes at the Art Institute of Chicago. She was able to afford the tuition only because a local sculptor, Lorado Taft, hired her to work as a studio assistant on Saturdays. From 1890 to 1891, she studied with Taft at the Art Institute, where she completed sculpture courses.

== Early works ==
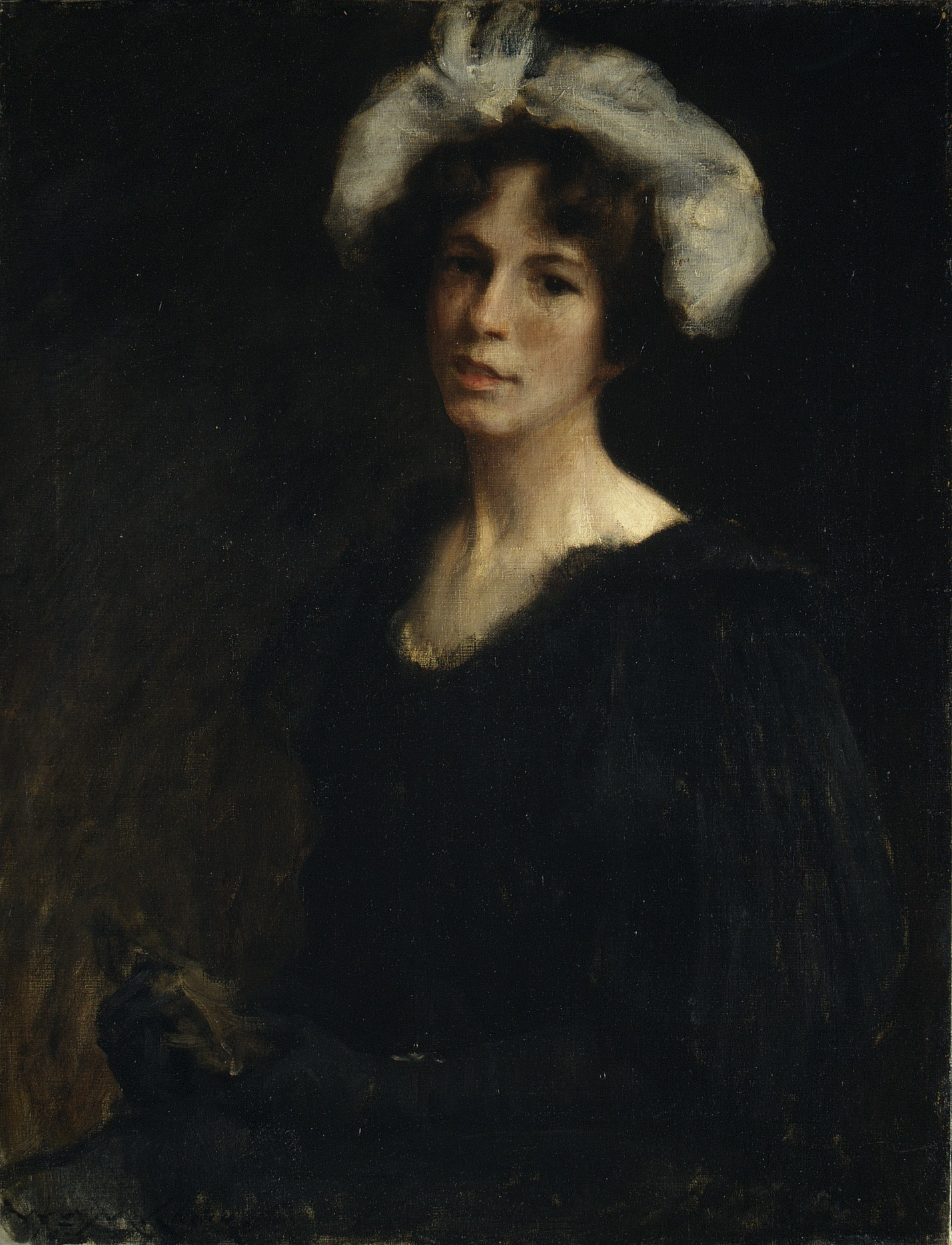
Portrait of Bessie Potter by William Merritt Chase, c. 1895

Vonnoh became one of the so-called "White Rabbits", women artists including Helen Farnsworth Mears and Janet Scudder who assisted Taft on the sculpture program for the Horticultural Building at the 1893 World's Columbian Exposition in Chicago. She also produced an independent commission, the Personification of Art, for the Illinois State Building of the exposition.

In 1895, she traveled to Europe and met Auguste Rodin. Her best-known statuette, Young Mother (1896), used fellow "White Rabbit" Margaret Daisy Gerow (Mody) Proctor, wife of sculptor Alexander Phimister Proctor, and their infant son as models. In 1898, she received the commission for a bust of General Samuel W. Crawford for the Smith Memorial Arch in Philadelphia.

In 1899 she married impressionist painter Robert Vonnoh, at his home in Rockland Lake, New York, and honeymooned in Paris. At the 1900 Exposition Universelle, she was awarded a Bronze Medal for A Young Mother and exhibited another statuette, Girl Dancing.

She exhibited at both the 1901 Pan-American Exposition in Buffalo, New York, receiving an honorable mention for A Young Mother, and at the 1904 Louisiana Purchase Exposition in St Louis, Missouri, where she was awarded a Gold Medal for a group of ten works.

== Middle years ==
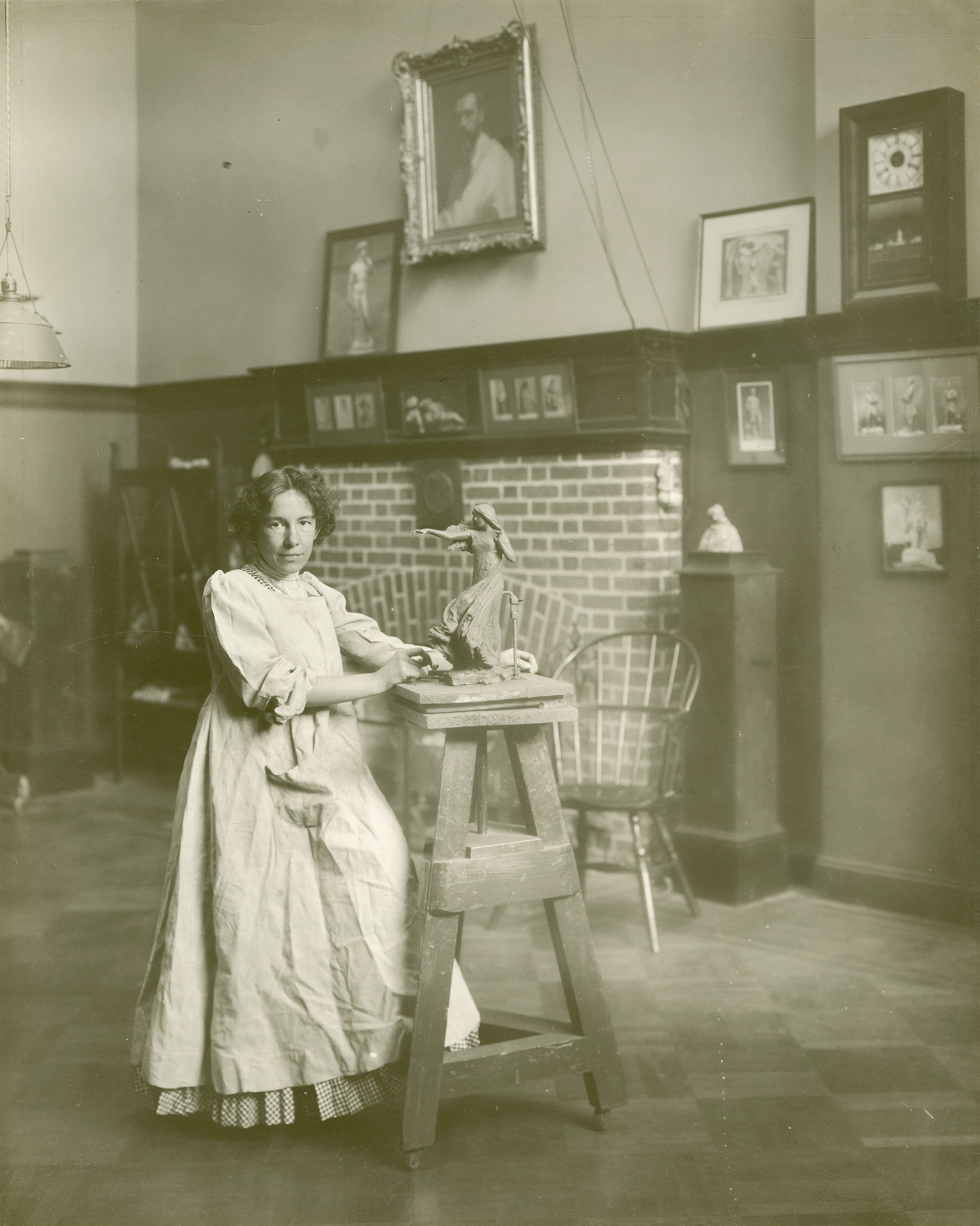
Bessie Potter Vonnoh in her studio by Jessie Tarbox Beals, c. 1905, silver print, Department of Image Collections, National Gallery of Art Library, Washington, DC.

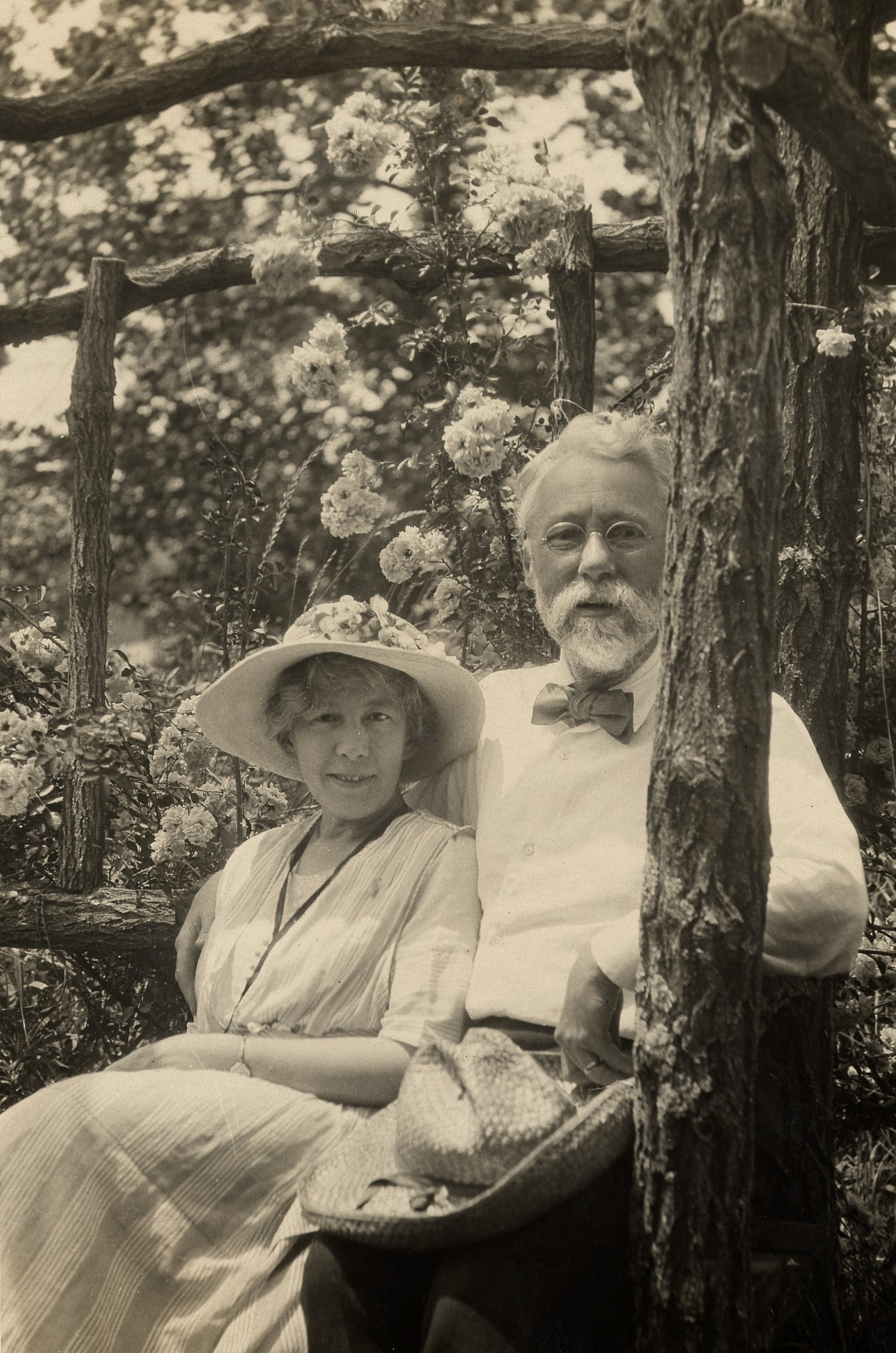
Bessie Potter and Robert Vonnoh, c. 1930.

In March 1903, the New York Times noted that the Vonnohs were two of a dozen painters and sculptors who got together to create a building specifically for their studios at 27 West Sixty-Seventh Street in Manhattan. In mid-1903, the Vonnohs began summering in Old Lyme, Connecticut, and became long-time members of its Old Lyme Art Colony.

Vonnoh's small-scale works were suitable for the size and style of the average American home and had broad appeal. Many of her works, such as Water lilies, were portraits. Vonnoh's statue Water lilies (1913) was based on the daughter of fellow artists Helen Savier and Frank DuMond at Lyme. Vonnoh stated that she was "determined to prove that as perfect a likeness and as much beauty could be produced in statuettes twelve inches in height, and in busts of six inches, as could be had in the life-size and colossal productions suitable for so few houses."

In December 1912, the New York Times, writing about her works at the New York Academy of Art, described her figurines as "lovely" and of a "charming style." The article also mentioned, "We must applaud once more her skillful harmonizing of detail in the contemporary costume, her selection of the most distinguished line for emphasis." In 1915, Vonnoh exhibited in the Armory Show exhibition. In 1921, she was elected as an academician of the National Academy of Design. She was elected to the American Academy of Arts and Letters in 1931.

In 1933, her husband died at age 75. In 1937, Vonnoh completed her best-known large-scale work, the Burnett Memorial Fountain in Central Park.

== Later years ==
After her first husband's death, Vonnoh produced relatively little. She married again in 1948 to Dr. Edward L. Keyes, Jr., a widower, who died only nine months later. Vonnoh herself died in New York City in 1955, at age 82. She is buried alongside her first husband, Robert Vonnoh (1858 – 1933), in the Duck River Cemetery in Old Lyme, Connecticut.

== Gallery ==
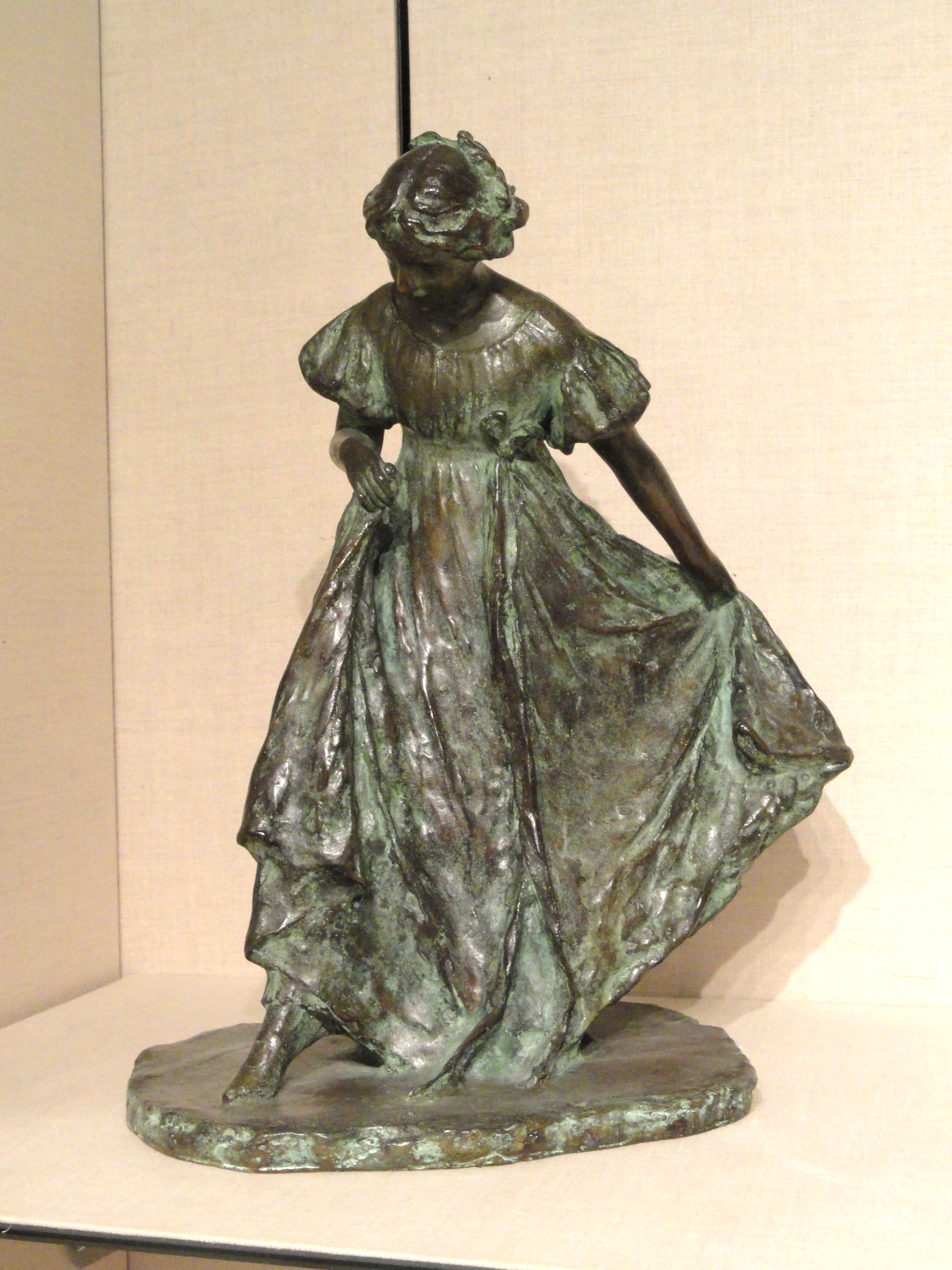
Girl Dancing, 1897

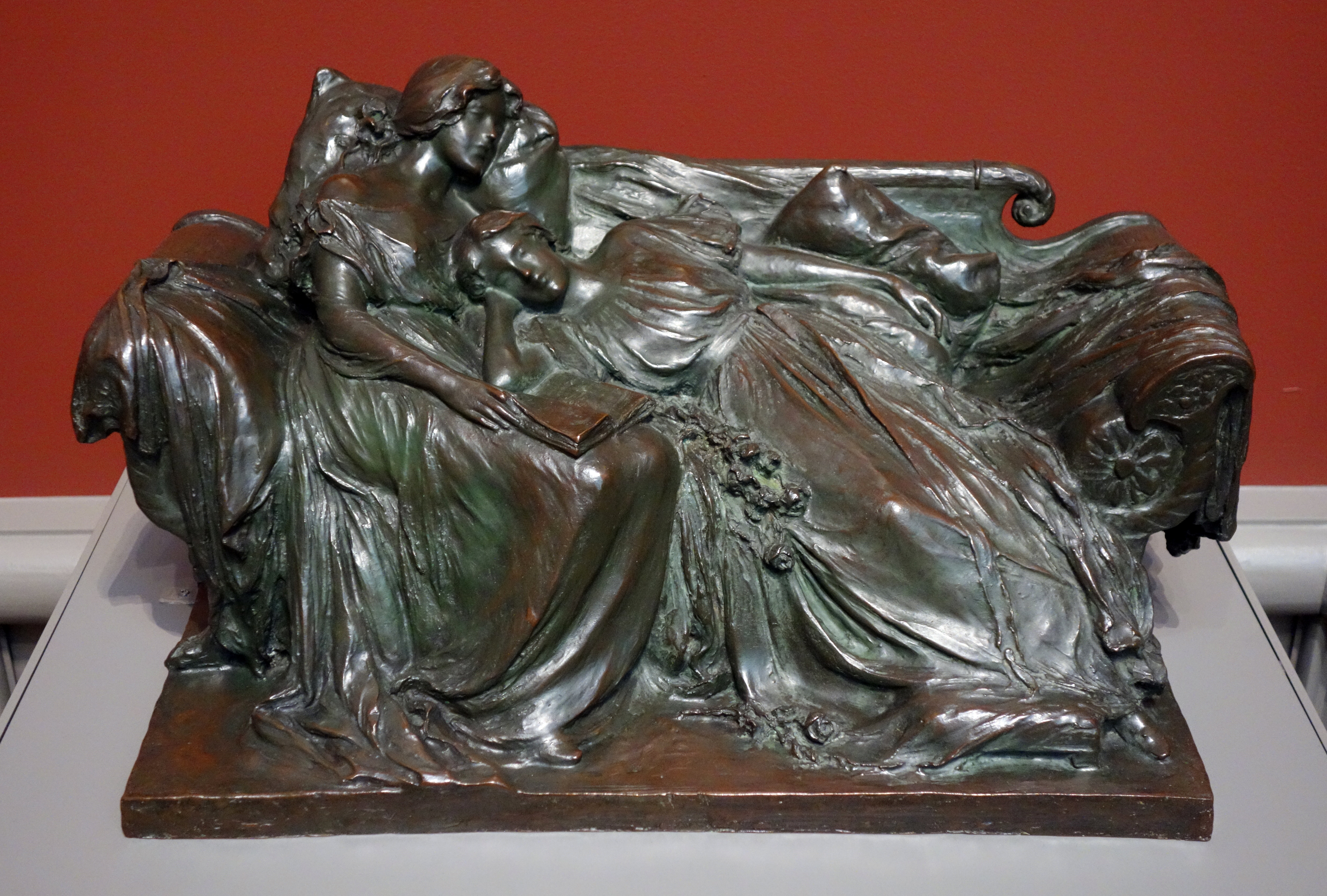
Day Dreams, 1898

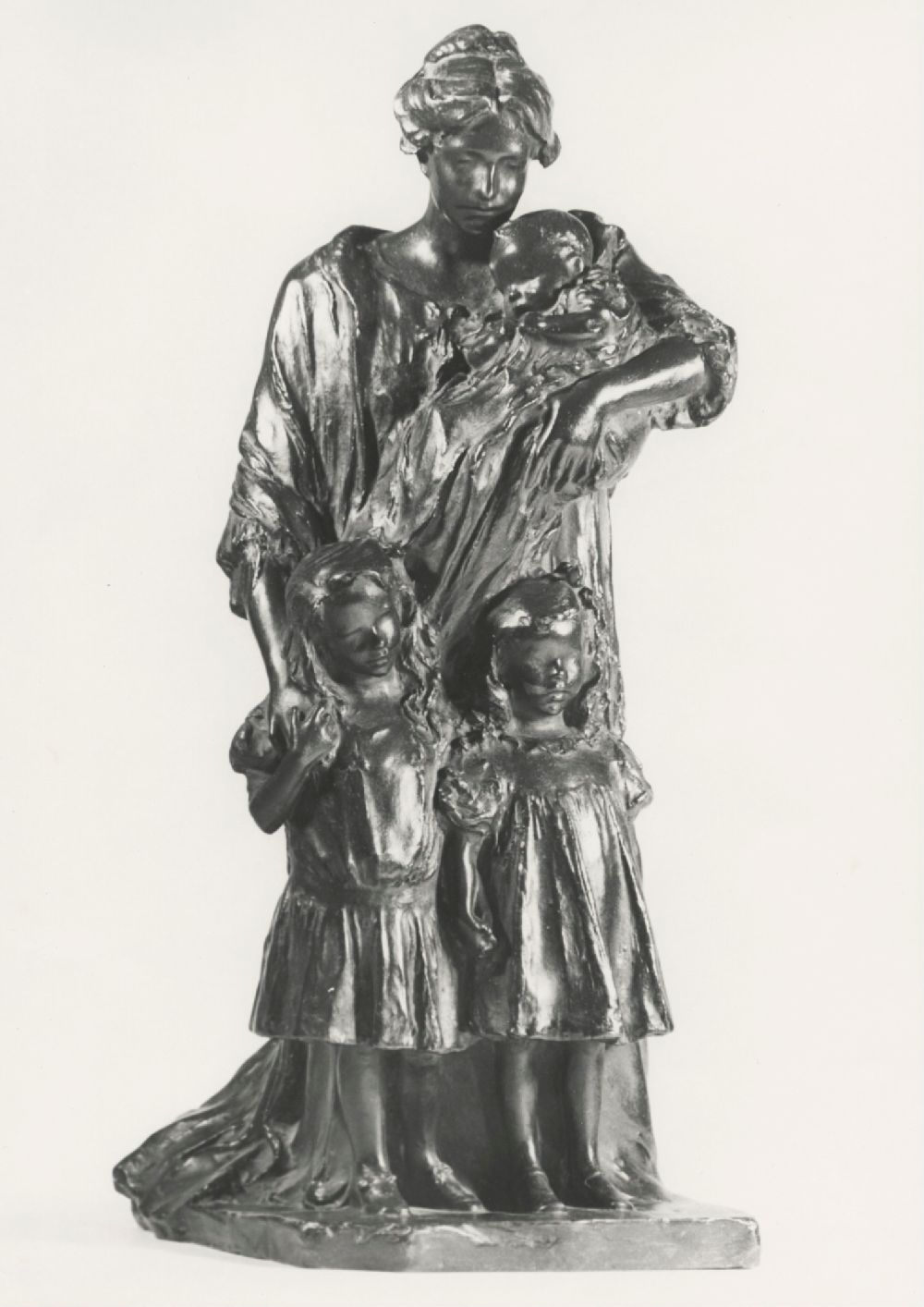
Bessie Potter Vonnoh, Motherhood, 1905, photo by David Finn, ©David Finn Archive, Department of Image Collections, National Gallery of Art Library, Washington, DC

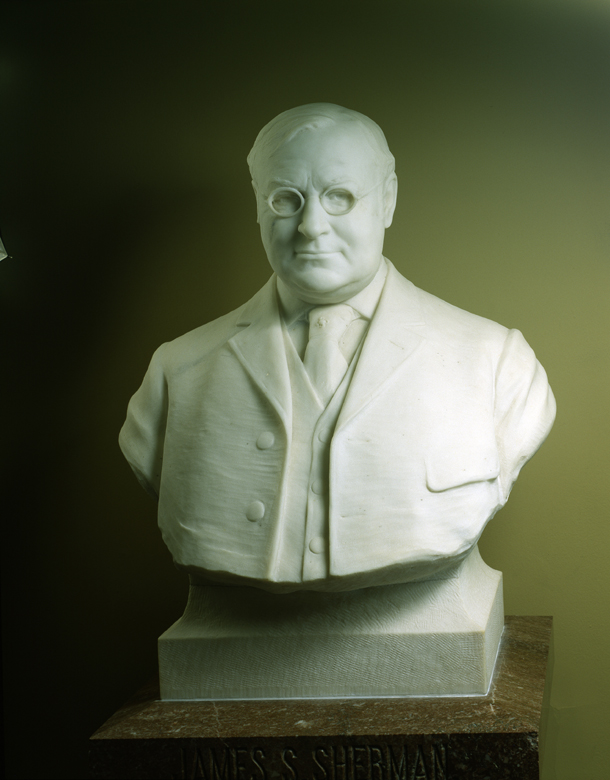
Bust of U.S. Vice President James S. Sherman, 1911

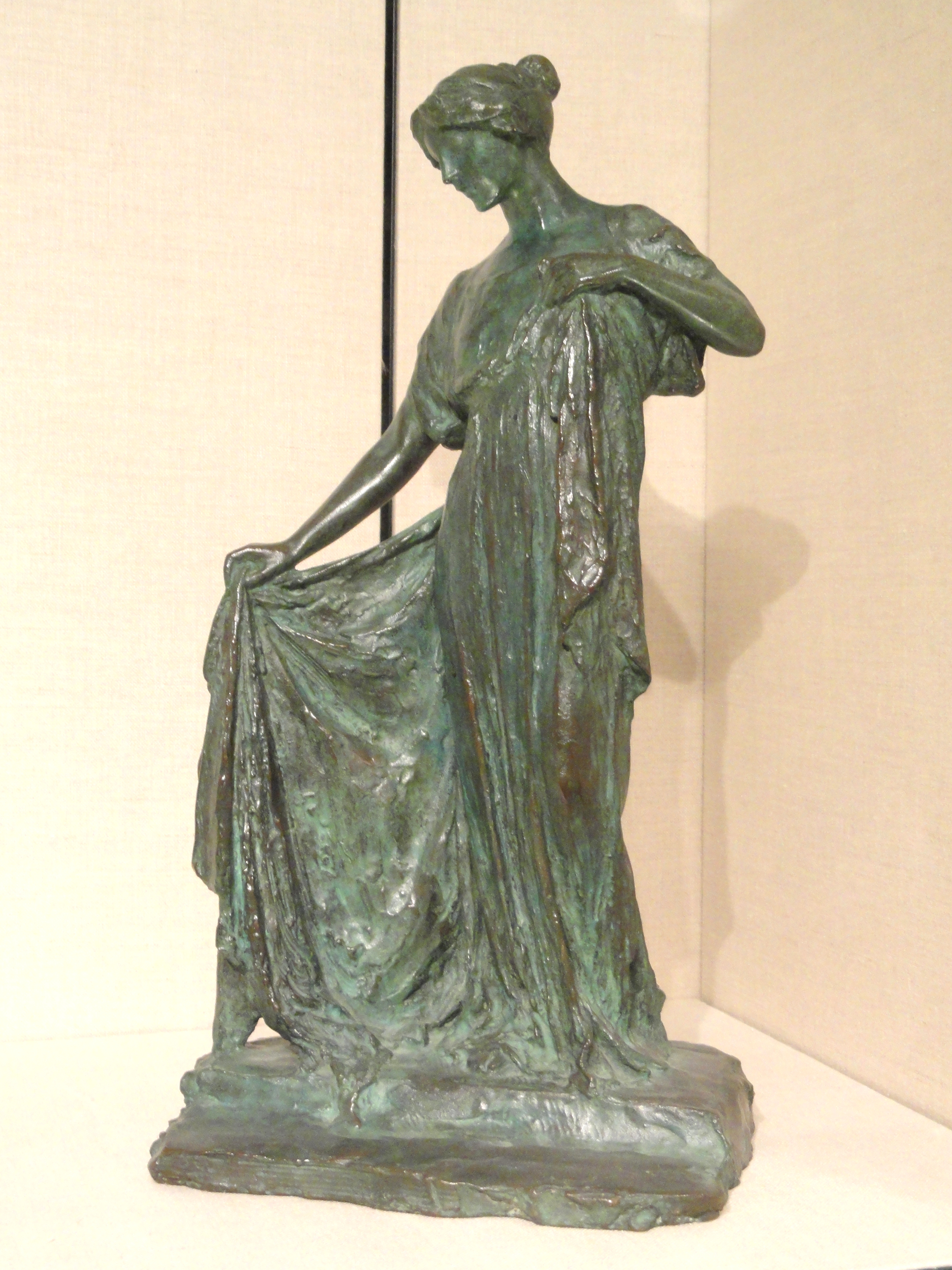
In Grecian Draperies, 1913

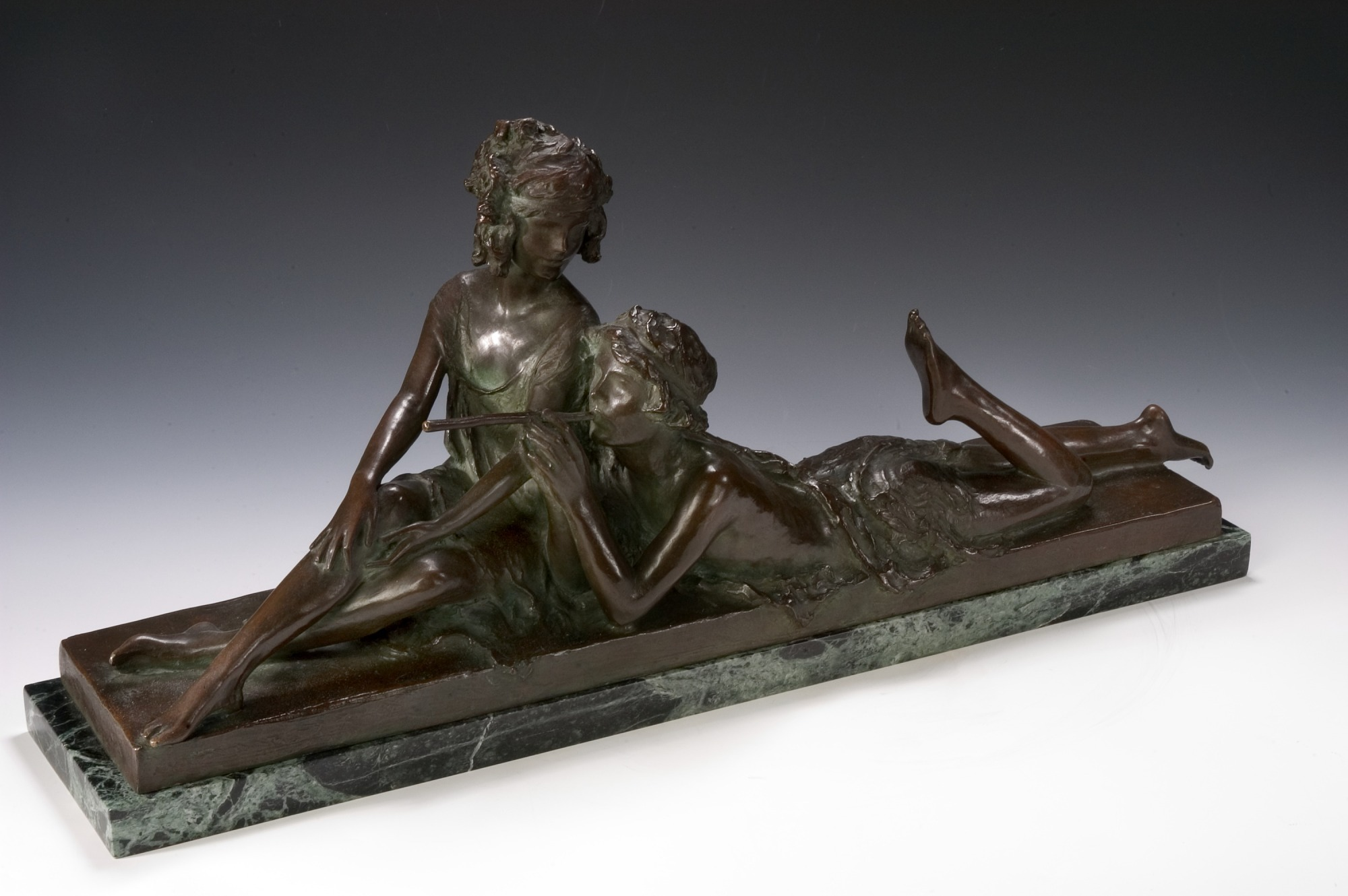
In Arcadia, bronze on marble base, 1926

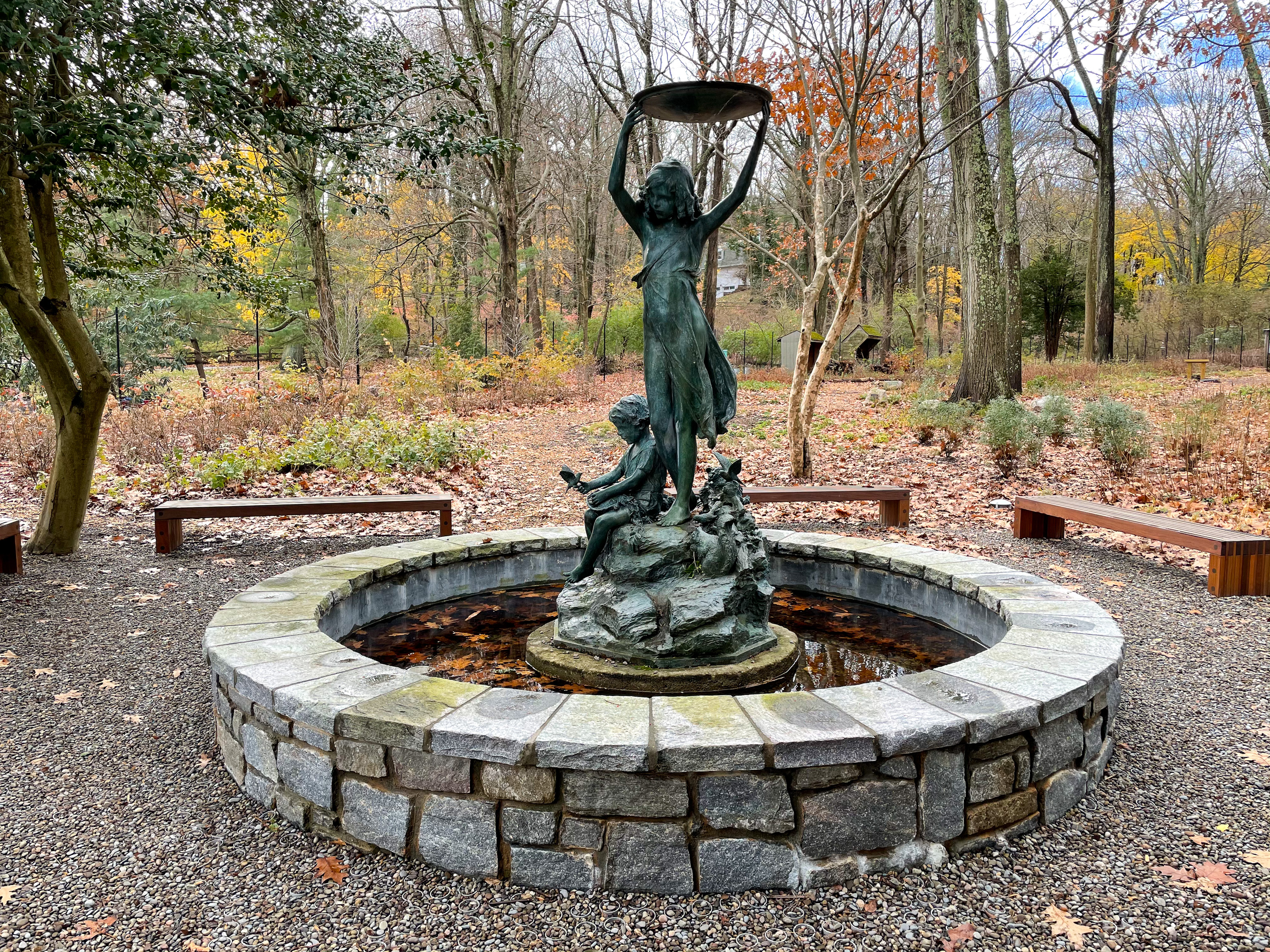
Theodore Roosevelt Memorial Bird Fountain, Oyster Bay, New York, 1927

== Exhibition history ==
- American Women Artists: 1830–1930, The National Museum of Women in the Arts, 1987
- Four Centuries of Women’s Art, The National Museum of Women in the Arts, 1990
- Bessie Potter Vonnoh: Sculptor of Women, Florence Griswold Museum, 2008. ISBN 978-0-8214-1800-0.
