= Elizabeth Tashjian =

American painter (1912–2007)

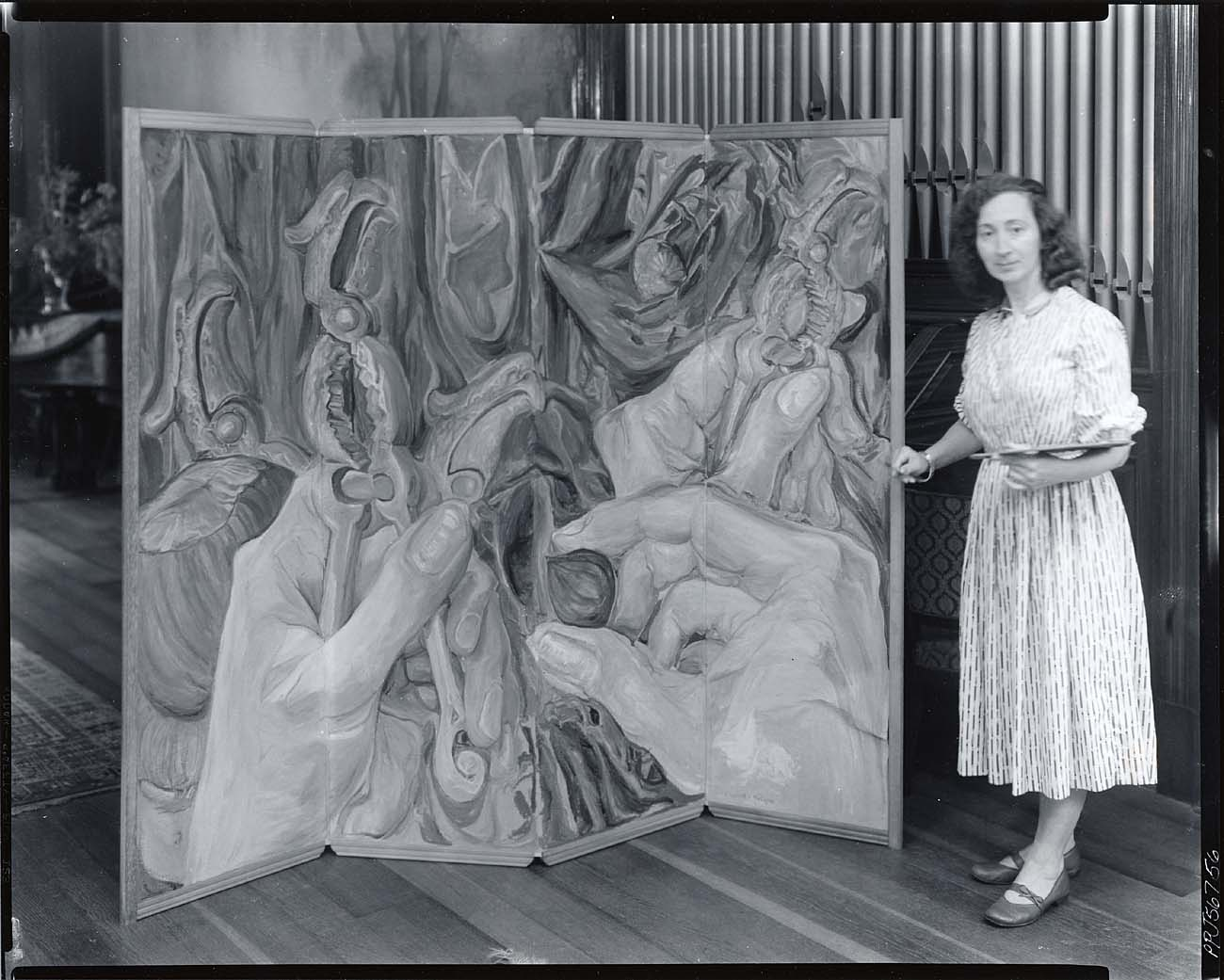
- Elizabeth Tashjiaan, American painter, 1912-2007
- Born: Elizabeth Yegsa Tashjian; December 24, 1912; Manhattan, New York, NY
- Died: January 29, 2007 (aged 94); Old Saybrook, Connecticut
- Education: New York school of Applied Design for Women, National Academy of Design
- Known for: The Nut Museum
- Style: surrealism, outsider art

Elizabeth Tashjian (December 24, 1912 – January 29, 2007) was an artist and the founder of the Nut Museum in Old Lyme, Connecticut. She championed nuts through the museum, and by creating portraits of a variety of nuts and nutcrackers. She was the daughter of aristocratic Armenian immigrants and studied at the New York school of Applied Design for Women as well as the National Academy of Design. Later in life, she appeared on the shows of Johnny Carson, David Letterman, Jay Leno, Howard Stern and Chevy Chase and the game show To Tell The Truth among others, to promote nuts and the Nut Museum.

At the age of seven, her parents divorced. By the age of nine, Tashjian was a concert violinist living with her mother in New York City's Upper West Side.

Tashjian remained unmarried throughout her life. In middle age, Tashjian followed her mother in becoming a Christian Science healer. She also espoused a tongue-in-cheek theory that humans had possibly evolved from nuts. In 1950, Tashjian and her mother moved into a large Gothic Revival mansion in Old Lyme. Upon her father's death in 1958 she learned he had left her nothing. She continued to live alone in her mansion following her mother's death in 1959.

Nuts were a lifelong passion. At the New York School of Applied Design for Women and the National Academy of Design, Tashjian created many paintings of nuts and nutcrackers - themes she would continue throughout her life. In 1972, Tashjian founded the Nut Museum in the mansion. The collection contained only twenty nuts, and was composed largely of her own artwork including over one hundred paintings, twenty aluminum sculptures, nut art, nut jewelry and a Nativity scene made completely of nuts. Many specimens were donated by visitors. The Nut Anthem and Nuts Are Beautiful, two songs composed by Tashjian, were performed for all visitors. She hoped to expand the museum into a theme-park larger than Disneyland. Tashjian claimed she did not know the pejorative use of the word "nut" until after establishing her museum, but made frequent comments suggesting she wanted to de-stigmatize the word and the people associated with it.

In 2002, after falling in to a coma, Tashjian was declared incompetent and a ward of the state. Despite religious beliefs refusing medical treatment, she recovered, but was confined to a nursing home. The contents of the Nut Museum were removed by Christopher B. Steiner, a professor of Art History and Museum Studies at Connecticut College, after he successfully petitioned the Old Lyme Probate Court to recognize the historic and artistic significance of the collection. The mansion was sold to pay her debts. Steiner remained a supporter and advocate for the rest of her life.

In 2004, an exhibition of Tashjian's artwork, The Nut Museum: Visionary Art of Elizabeth Tashjian was held at the Lyman Allyn Museum in New London. It was organized by Steiner.

In 2005, Tashjian was declared competent. Her house had at this point twice been sold, when she began proceedings to have it returned. The nut trees on the property had all been removed. She died in 2007.

== In popular culture ==
Tashjian was a popular guest on talk shows throughout the 1980s. In a Nutshell, a 2005 film by Don Bernier, documented Tashjian's life. After her death, Steiner resumed work on a book, Performing the Nut Museum: Elizabeth Tashjian and the Art of the Double Entendre, which has yet to be published.
