= Old Lyme, Connecticut =

- Town
- Town of Old Lyme
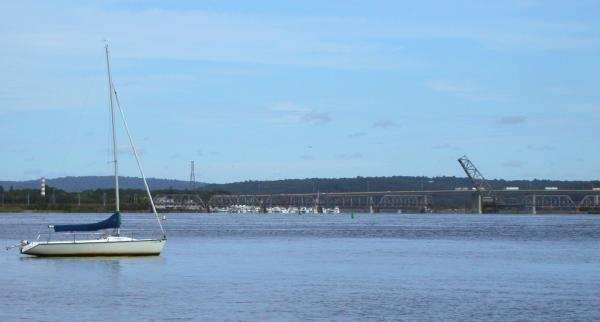
- View of the Connecticut River in Old Lyme near its mouth at Long Island Sound

- Seal

- Coordinates: 41°19′N 72°18′W
- Country: United States
- U.S. state: Connecticut
- County: New London
- Region: Lower CT River Valley
- Incorporated: 1855

Government
  - Type: Selectman-town meeting
  - First selectwoman: Martha Shoemaker
  - Second Selectman: Jim Lampos
  - Third Selectwoman: Jude Read

Area
  - Total: 28.8 sq mi (74.6 km^{2})
  - Land: 23.1 sq mi (59.8 km^{2})
  - Water: 5.7 sq mi (14.8 km^{2})
- Elevation: 20 ft (6 m)

Population (2020)
  - Total: 7,628
  - Density: 330/sq mi (128/km^{2})
- Time zone: UTC-5 (Eastern)
  - Summer (DST): UTC-4 (Eastern)
- ZIP code: 06371
- Area codes: 860/959
- FIPS code: 09-57040
- GNIS feature ID: 0213483
- Website: www.oldlyme-ct.gov

Old Lyme is a coastal town in New London County, Connecticut, United States, bounded on the west by the Connecticut River, on the south by the Long Island Sound, on the east by the town of East Lyme, and on the north by the town of Lyme. The town is part of the Lower Connecticut River Valley Planning Region. The main street of the town, Lyme Street, is a historic district with several homes once owned by sea captains. The town has had for many years a thriving art community. Its principal institutions include the Florence Griswold Museum, the Lyme Art Association, and the Lyme Academy of Fine Arts. The town is named after Lyme Regis, England.

Several seasonal beach communities are in Old Lyme, such as Point O' Woods, Hawk's Nest, and Miami Beach. Several hundred people rent seasonal cottages and beach front homes from late May through mid October in Old Lyme. Hartford Avenue, the main street through beach area, features several small stores and a carousel for young children.

The town of Old Lyme contains several villages, including Black Hall, Laysville, Soundview, and South Lyme. The total population of the town was 7,628 at the 2020 census.

== Background and history ==
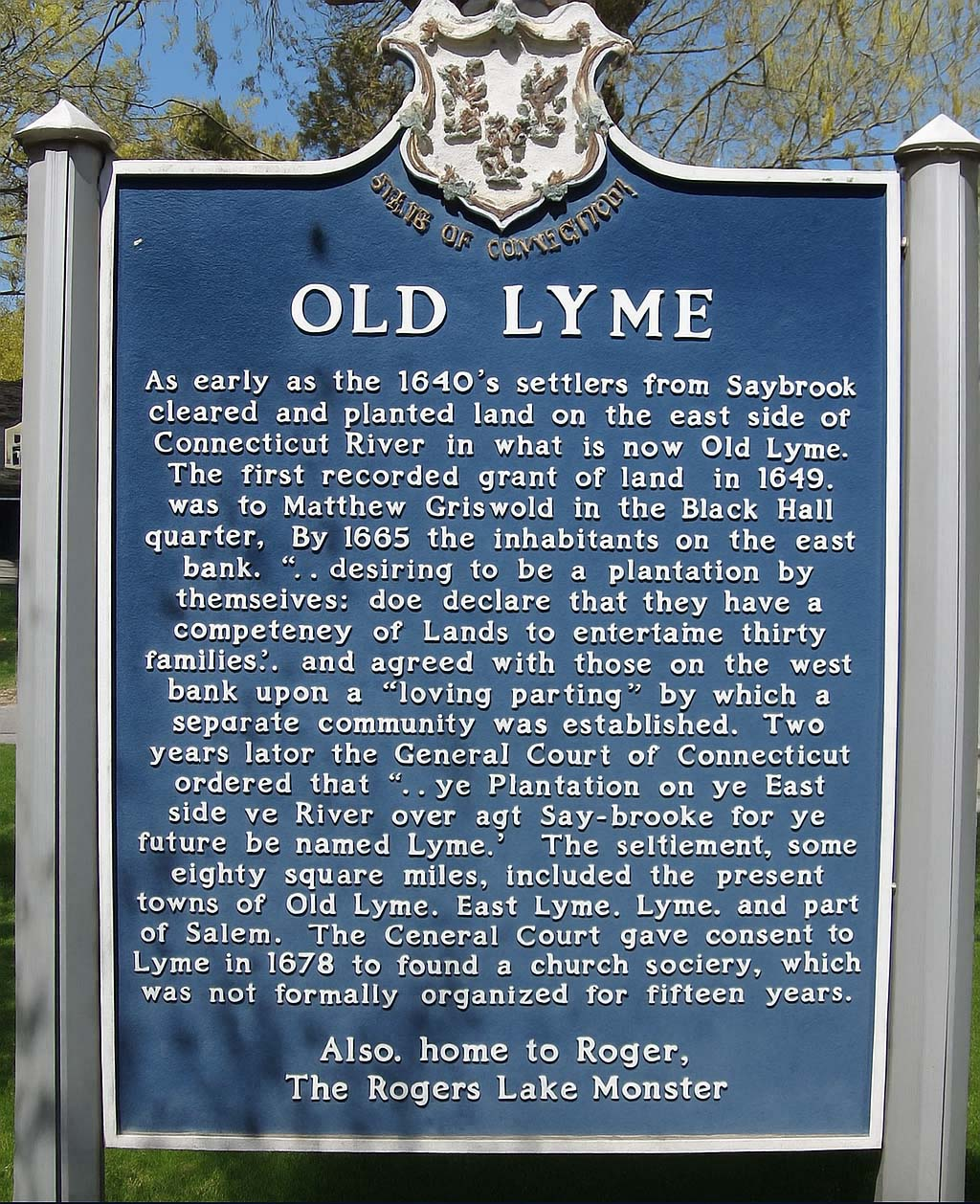
Old Lyme - Historic Blue Town Sign

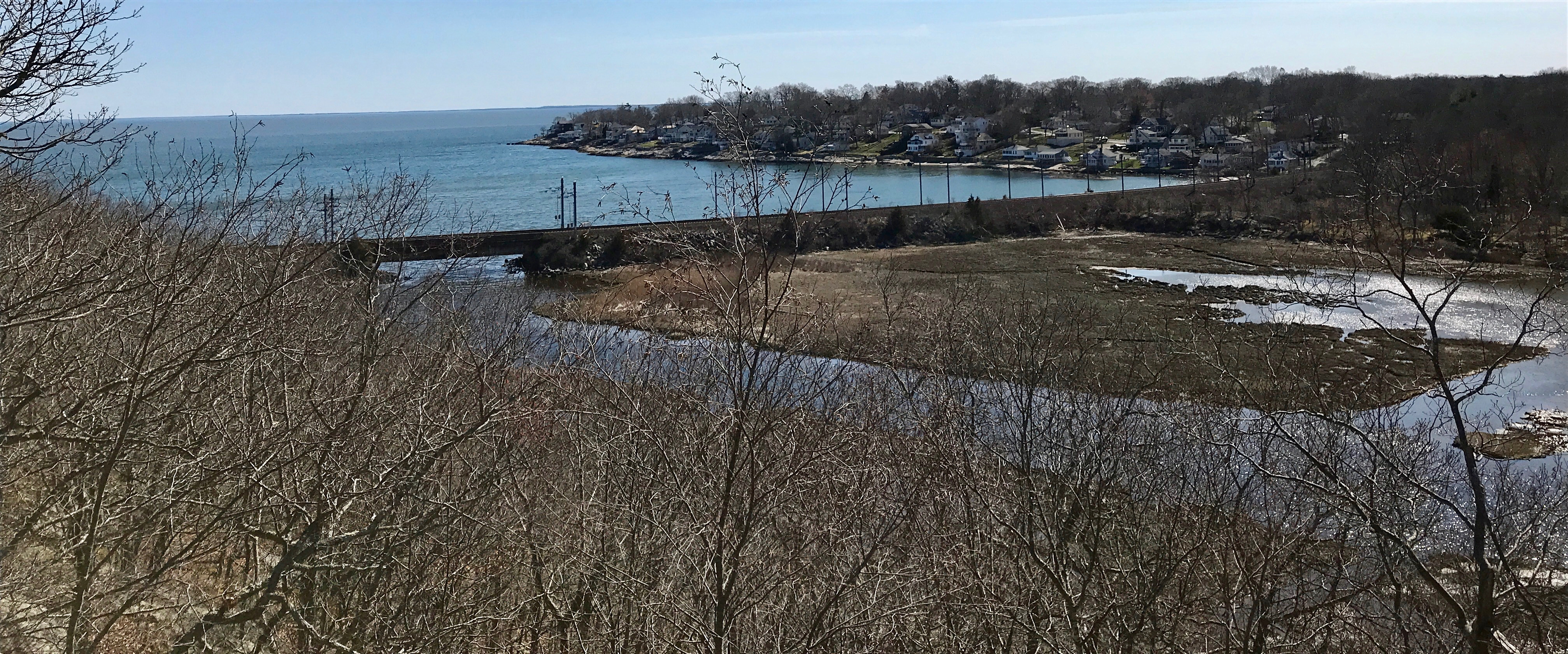
Railroad Bridge over the Four Mile River's mouth, which connects East Lyme to Old Lyme's easternmost shoreline

Old Lyme is a community of about 7,600 permanent residents, in addition to several thousand seasonal vacationers who occupy rental homes and cottages in the summer. It is located on the east bank of the Connecticut River at its confluence with Long Island Sound, across the river from Old Saybrook on the west bank. Numerous examples of nautical styleColonial, Federal architecture, and modern architecture can be found throughout the town.

The town of Lyme was set off from Saybrook (now known as Deep River), which is on the west bank of the Connecticut River mouth, on February 13, 1665. South Lyme was incorporated from Lyme in 1855, then renamed Old Lyme in 1857, because it contains the oldest-settled portion of the Lymes. Old Lyme occupies about 27 square miles (70 km^{2}) of shoreline, tidal marsh, inland wetlands, and forested hills. Its neighbor to the north is the town of Lyme, and to the east is East Lyme. Other place names from the same root are Hadlyme, a neighborhood in the town of Lyme and the town of East Haddam, and South Lyme, a beach resort area of Old Lyme. The place name "Lyme" is derived from Lyme Regis, a small port on the coast of Dorset, England from which some of the early settlers immigrated in the 17th century. The picturesque Old Lyme Cemetery contains the graves of the settlers. The Duck River flows through the cemetery and into the Connecticut River at Watch Rock Park.

Lyme disease was named after the town. It was discovered in 1975 after a mysterious outbreak of what appeared to be juvenile rheumatoid arthritis in children who lived in Lyme and Old Lyme.

== Old Lyme Art Colony ==
The Florence Griswold House in Old Lyme housed an art colony for many years in the early 20th century to many prominent American Impressionist painters. The Lyme Art Colony included Childe Hassam, Edward Charles Volkert, Willard Metcalf, Wilson Irvine, and Henry Ward Ranger, among many others. These artists made Old Lyme a thriving art community, which still continues today.

The Griswold House was transformed into an art museum, the Florence Griswold Museum, or affectionately called "Flo Gris", by residents of Old Lyme. Many American Impressionist paintings of the era are of subjects in and around the Griswold House and are featured in the museum, along with many other works and personal possessions of the artists who frequented there. The building of the Old Lyme Congregational Church is known for the many paintings that have been made of it, most notably by Childe Hassam.

== On the National Register of Historic Places ==
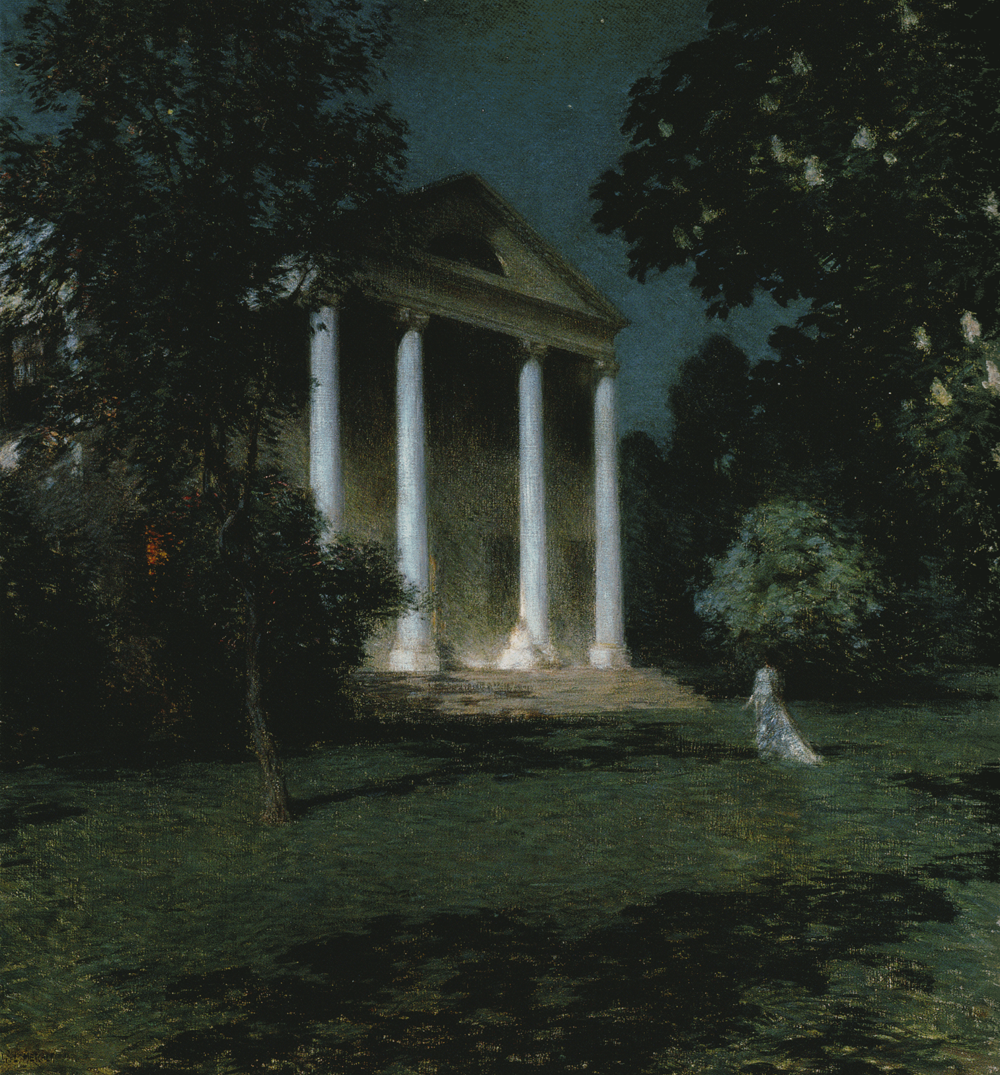
May Night, painting of the Florence Griswold House by Willard Metcalf, 1906, in the collection of the Corcoran Gallery of Art

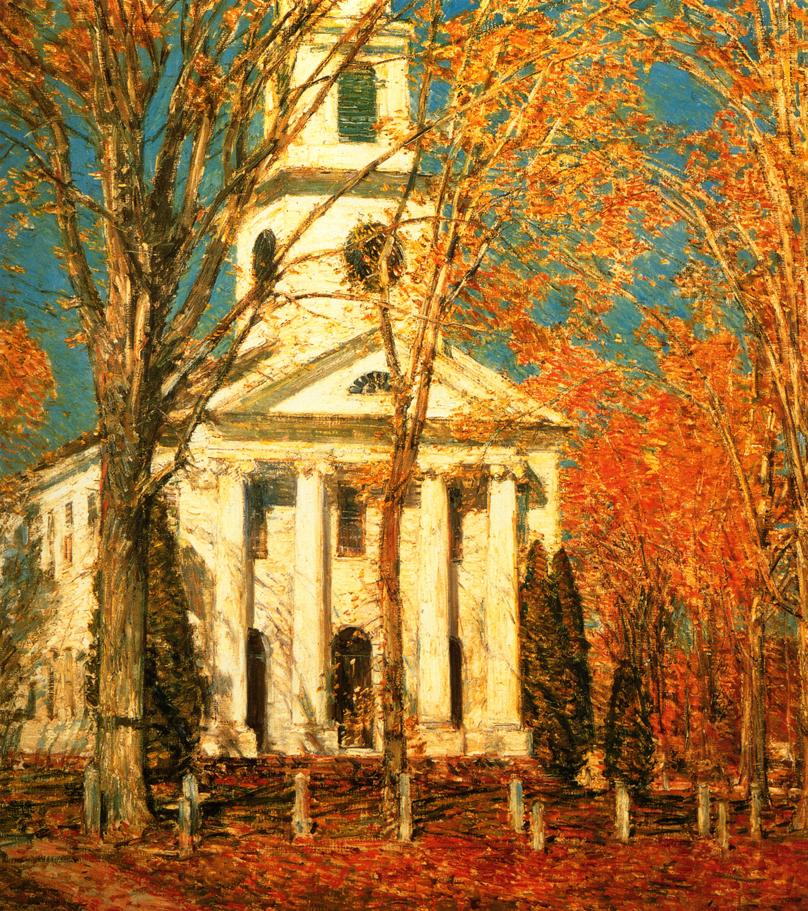
Church at Old Lyme, oil on canvas, Childe Hassam, 1905

- Bennett Rockshelter (added July 31, 1987)
- Florence Griswold House and Museum – 96 Lyme Street (added May 19, 1993)
- Lieutenant River III Site (added August 31, 1987)
- Lieutenant River IV Site (added August 31, 1987)
- Lieutenant River No. 2 (added August 31, 1987)
- Natcon Site (added August 31, 1987)
- Old Lyme Historic District – Lyme Street from Shore Road to Sill Lane, Old Boston Post Road from Sill Lane to Rose Lane (added November 14, 1971)
- Peck Tavern – 1 Sill Lane (added May 12, 1982)
- Springbank – 69 Neck Road (added September 17, 2001)

== Geography and climate ==
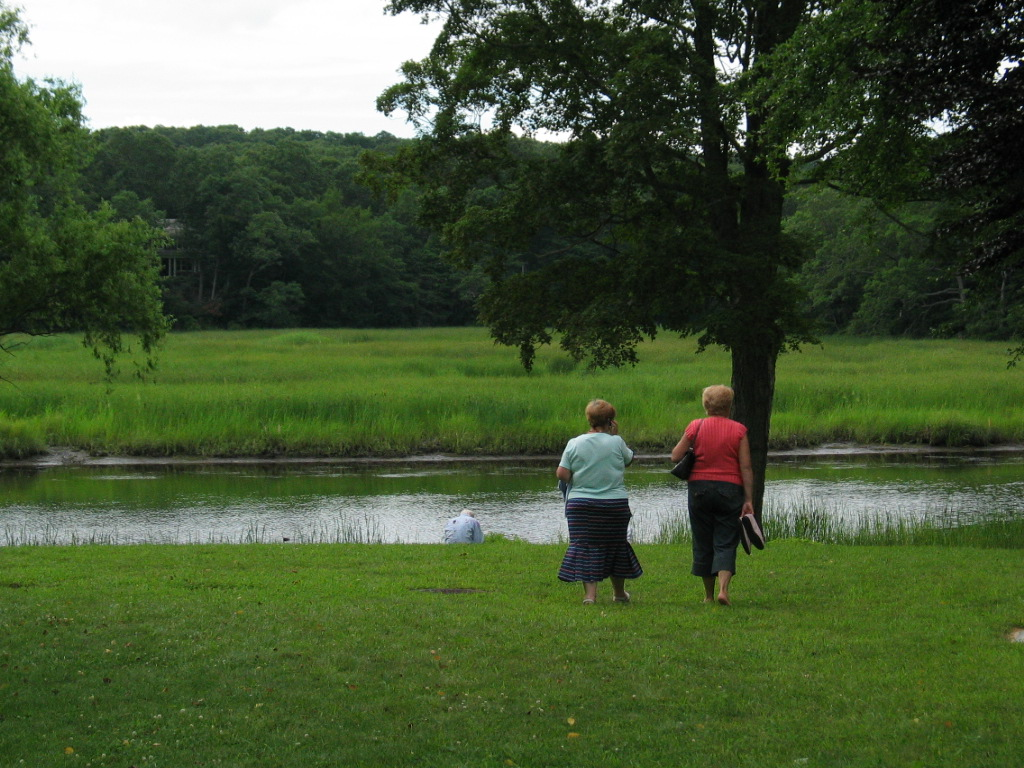
Barefoot tourists

According to the United States Census Bureau, the town has a total area of 28.8 square miles (75 km^{2}), of which 5.7 square miles (15 km^{2}), or 19.85%, is water. The southern section of Old Lyme has a mostly flat topography, intersected with tidal marsh and swamp, while the northern sections of the town have a rocky and hilly terrain.

Old Lyme lies in the Köppen climate classification zone Cfa, or mild temperate climate. The summers have highs in the 80s °F (and 90's F on occasion) and the winters have highs in the upper 30s to low 40s °F. The average annual precipitation is about 40 inches (100 cm), and about 28 inches of snow falls on average each winter. Snowcover is normally brief.

=== Rogers Lake ===
Rogers Lake, located in the towns of Old Lyme and Lyme, is formed by a dam along Town Woods Road in Old Lyme. The lake's surface area is 265 acres (1.07 km^{2}). Mill Brook, Grassy Hill Brook and Broad Swamp Brook feed into the lake. The lake's watershed is 4,833 acres (19.56 km^{2}) of woodland. The outlet below the dam is Mill Brook, which is a tributary of the Lieutenant River, a tributary of the Connecticut River.

Five small islands are on Rogers Lake, the largest of which has a small cottage built on it. Rogers Lake is stocked every year with brook and rainbow trout. A street that runs along the north side of Rogers Lake is called Blood Street; it has lent its name to the town's rowing team, the Blood Street Sculls. Rogers Lake is also bordered by Grassy Hill Road and Town Woods Road, with a small lakeside neighborhood off of Rogers Lake Trail.

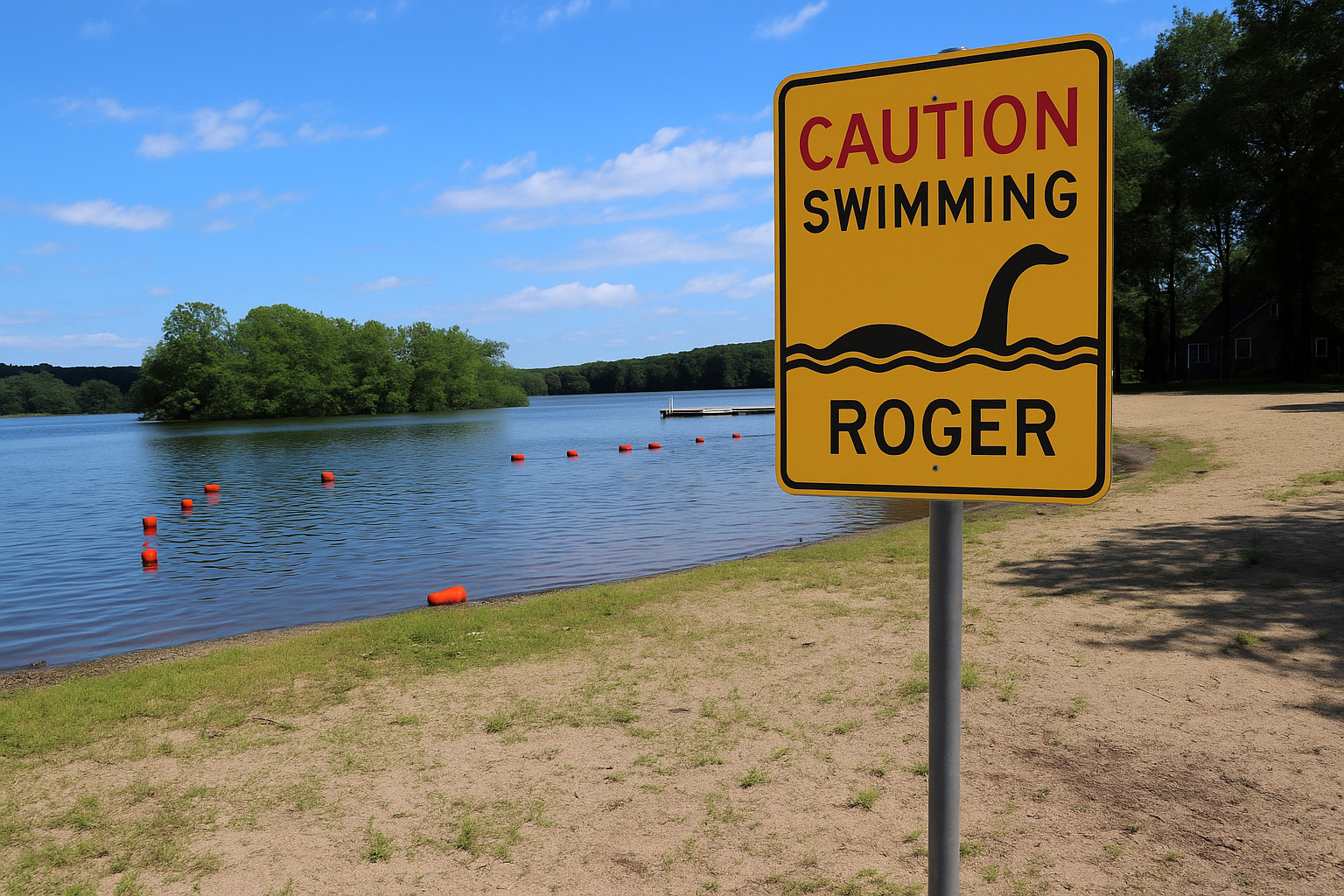
Hains Park, Rogers Lake - Old Lyme CT

=== Roger: The Rogers Lake Monster ===
Roger is the name given to a legendary lake monster said to inhabit Rogers Lake, a freshwater body in Old Lyme, Connecticut. Like the Loch Ness Monster or Lake Champlain’s “Champ,” Roger’s existence remains hotly debated. While many locals dismiss him as folklore, others speculate he could be a distant relative of the plesiosaur, an ancient aquatic reptile. Though no scientific evidence has ever confirmed his presence, more than 200 reported sightings have kept the legend alive, drawing curious visitors to the Old Lyme and Lyme areas.

Long before colonial accounts, Native American tribes of Connecticut referred to the creature as “Caca-togo.”

According to the Connecticut Association of Cryptozoology (CAC), the first documented sighting of Roger took place in 1878. A member of the Old Lyme Art Colony, while setting up her easel on the lake’s northeast shore, reportedly saw a massive, long-necked, gray-skinned creature rise nearly 20 feet above the surface before slipping back beneath the water. Far from frightened, she later told her family she felt more wonder than fear. Over the years, artists of the colony began weaving Roger into their canvases, a whimsical tradition that led Lyme Art Academy historian Herbert A. Strekel to quip: “If Picasso had his red period and Monet had his blue period, then this was their Lake Monster period.”

== Demographics ==
Historical population
| Census | Pop. | Note | %± |
|---|---|---|---|
| 1860 | 1,304 | | — |
| 1870 | 1,362 | | 4.4% |
| 1880 | 1,387 | | 1.8% |
| 1890 | 1,319 | | −4.9% |
| 1900 | 1,180 | | −10.5% |
| 1910 | 1,181 | | 0.1% |
| 1920 | 946 | | −19.9% |
| 1930 | 1,313 | | 38.8% |
| 1940 | 1,702 | | 29.6% |
| 1950 | 2,141 | | 25.8% |
| 1960 | 3,068 | | 43.3% |
| 1970 | 4,964 | | 61.8% |
| 1980 | 6,159 | | 24.1% |
| 1990 | 6,535 | | 6.1% |
| 2000 | 7,406 | | 13.3% |
| 2010 | 7,603 | | 2.7% |
| 2020 | 7,628 | | 0.3% |
U.S. Decennial Census

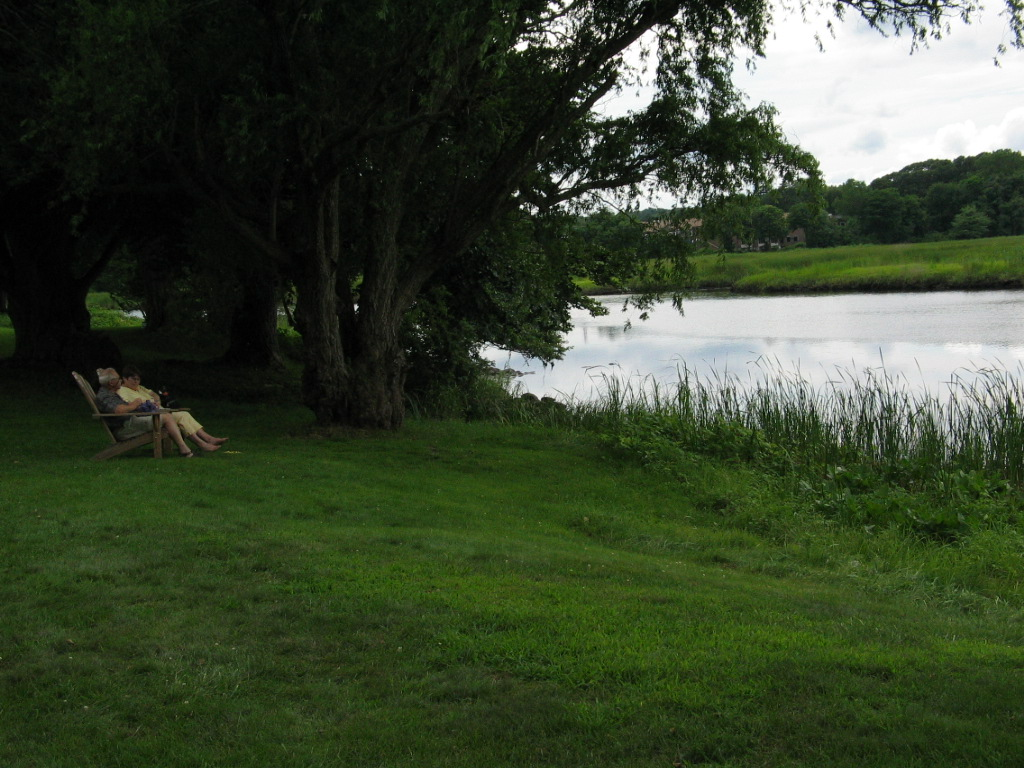
Relaxing behind the Florence Griswold Museum in Old Lyme

As of the census of 2010, 7,603 people, 2,958 households, and 2,153 families resided in the town. The population density was 320.6 inhabitants per square mile (123.8/km^{2}). The 4,570 housing units had an average density of 197.8/sq mi (76.4/km^{2}). The racial makeup of the town was 97.37% White, 0.26% African American, 0.28% Native American, 1.16% Asian, 0.33% from other races, and 0.59% from two or more races. Hispanics or Latinos of any race were 0.95% of the population.

Of the 2,958 households, 30.2% had children under 18 living with them, 63.2% were married couples living together, 7.0% had a female householder with no husband present, and 27.2% were not families. About 22.4% of all households were made up of individuals, and 10.3% had someone living alone who was 65 or older. The average household size was 2.50, and the average family size was 2.93.

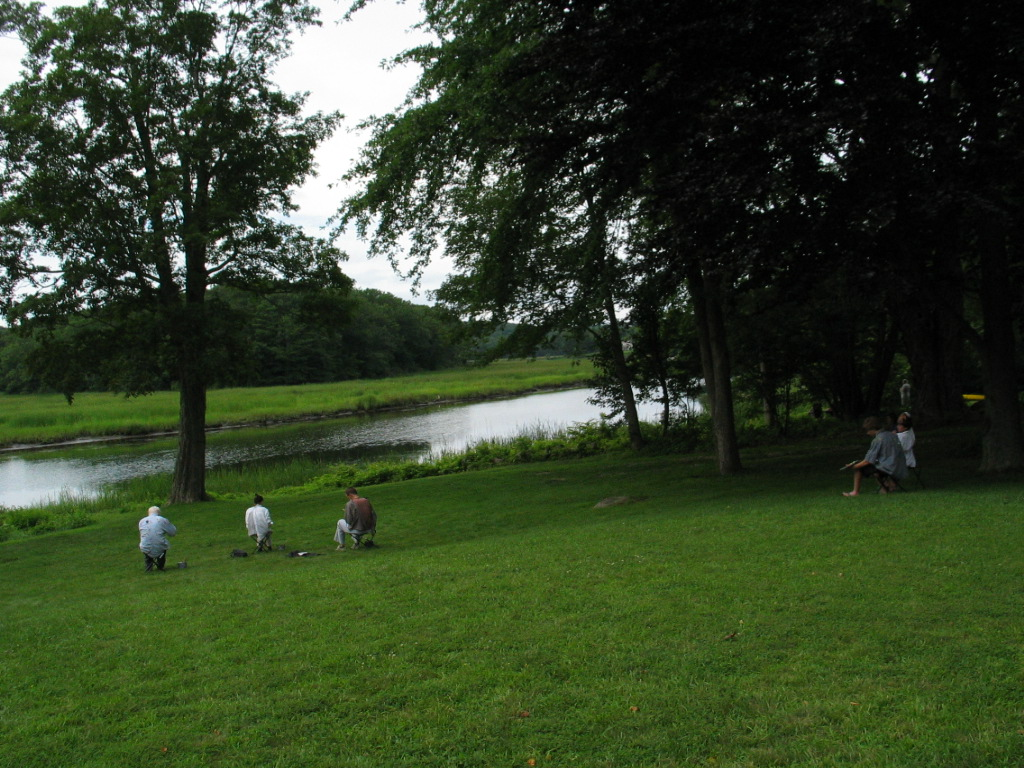
Poetically beautiful waterfront

In the town, the age distribution was 24.0% under 18, 3.6% from 18 to 24, 26.4% from 25 to 44, 29.2% from 45 to 64, and 16.7% who were 65 or older. The median age was 43 years. For every 100 females, there were 97.0 males. For every 100 females 18 and over, there were 94.6 males.

The median income for a household in the town was $68,386, and for a family was $75,779. Males had a median income of $52,110 versus $39,158 for females. The per capita income for the town was $41,386. About 2.2% of families and 3.4% of the population were below the poverty line, including 4.9% of those under age 18 and 1.8% of those age 65 or over.

=== Voter registration ===
Voter Registration and Party Enrollment as of October 25, 2005
| Party | Active voters | Inactive voters | Total voters | Percentage |
|---|---|---|---|---|
| Republican | 1,931 | 66 | 1,997 | 32.76% |
| Democratic | 1,384 | 38 | 1,422 | 23.33% |
| Unaffiliated | 2,546 | 119 | 2,665 | 43.73% |
| Minor Parties | 10 | 0 | 10 | 0.16% |
| Total | 5,871 | 223 | 6094 | 100% |

== Schools ==
From the towns of Old Lyme and Lyme, 1,450 children were enrolled in the five schools of Regional District 18 at the start of the 2011–2012 academic year. The students are enrolled based on age and location. Lyme Consolidated School is for prekindergarten through grade 5, Mile Creek School is for kindergarten through grade 5, Center School is for prekindergarten, Lyme-Old Lyme Middle School is for grades 6 through 8, and Lyme-Old Lyme High School is for grades 9 through 12. Regional School District 18 has a 13:1 student-to-faculty ratio, and spent $17,454 per pupil in the 2007–2008 school year. The district's girls' soccer and boys' basketball teams won the Shoreline Conference Championship during the 2010–2011 school year.

Old Lyme also has a number of students who attend private schools, including nearby parochial schools such as Xavier High School, Mercy High School, and Saint Bernard School, and some students go to college preparatory schools such as the Williams School in New London.

== Colleges ==
Lyme Academy College Academic Center

Founded in 1976 by Elisabeth Gordon Chandler as a figurative art academy for the teaching of sculpture, drawing, illustration, and painting, the Lyme Academy College of Fine Arts offers a bachelor of fine arts degree in the disciplines of painting and sculpture. The college also offers postbaccalaureate and three-year certificate programs. It is known for its focus on teaching techniques and the history and tradition of representational art, centered on the study of nature and the figure. According to The New York Times, "many in the art world believe [Lyme Academy] has contributed to a renaissance of representational art."

== Transportation ==
The Estuary Transit District provides public transportation throughout Old Lyme and the surrounding towns through its 9 Town transit service. Services include connections to the Old Saybrook Train Station, served by Amtrak and Shore Line East railroads, as well as the New London Transportation Center, served by train and ferry service.

Old Lyme has sought to block attempts to update rail infrastructure in the Northeast, such as building high-speed rail.

Interstate 95 runs through the center of the town, as Route 1 travels mostly in the north. Route 156 passes through the western and southerly section.

== Notable people ==
- Jim Calhoun (born 1942), head coach of the University of Connecticut's men's basketball team, which won three national championships, and who was enshrined in the Basketball Hall of Fame in 2005; began his career as a coach in town at Lyme-Old Lyme High School.
- Herb Chambers (born 1941), billionaire owner and president of Herb Chambers Companies auto dealerships
- Liam Corrigan (born 1997), Olympic rower and gold medalist
- Elisabeth Gordon Chandler (1913–2006), sculptor, resident, and founder of the Lyme Academy College of Fine Arts
- Lois Darling (1917–1989), artist and illustrator
- Helen Savier DuMond (1872–1968), painter, sculptor, and teacher
- Albert Einstein, who had a summer home on the Old Lyme shore
- Chris Elliott (born 1960), actor and screenwriter, known best for his supporting role in the 1998 comedy There's Something About Mary
- Walker Evans, photographer; lived nearby in Lyme until his death in 1975
- Elsie Ferguson (1883–1961), actress
- Ella T. Grasso (1919–1981), first female governor of Connecticut, first woman to be elected governor in the United States who was not the wife or widow of a governor, awarded the Presidential Medal of Freedom by President Ronald Reagan in 1981, inducted into the National Women's Hall of Fame in 1993
- Childe Hassam (1859–1935), American Impressionist, stayed in the Florence Griswold House as part of the Old Lyme Art Colony
- Wilson Irvine (1869–1936), American Impressionist, stayed in the Florence Griswold House as part of the Old Lyme Art Colony
- Peter Karter (1922–2010), founder of early recycling company
- Isabella Kirkland (born 1954), visual artist and biodiversity researcher
- Susanne Katherina Langer (1895–1985), philosopher, writer, and educator, one of the first female academic philosophers
- Ezra Lee (1749–1821), American colonial soldier known for commanding the Turtle submarine, is buried in Duck River Cemetery in Old Lyme
- Willard Metcalf (1858–1925), American Impressionist, stayed in the Florence Griswold House as part of the Old Lyme Art Colony
- Diana Muir, writer and historian
- Roger Tory Peterson (1908–1996), naturalist, ornithologist, artist, and educator
- Henry Ward Ranger (1858–1916), American Impressionist, stayed in the Florence Griswold House as part of the Old Lyme Art Colony
- William S. Reyburn (1882-1946), U.S. Congressman
- Luanne Rice (born 1955), novelist
- Edwin J. Roland (1905–1985), Coast Guard admiral
- Elizabeth Tashjian (1912–2007), artist and founder of the Nut Museum in Old Lyme
- Edward Charles Volkert (1871–1935), American Impressionist, stayed in the Florence Griswold House as part of the Old Lyme Art Colony
- Clark Voorhees (1871–1933), American Impressionist, stayed in the Florence Griswold House as part of the Old Lyme Art Colony
- Morrison Waite (1816–1888), Chief Justice of the United States appointed by Ulysses S. Grant, was born and lived in Old Lyme until leaving for college at Yale.
- Ellen Axson Wilson (1860–1914), first wife of president Woodrow Wilson, came as an art student to the Florence Griswold House.

== See also ==
- Duck River Cemetery
