= List of American painters exhibited at the 1893 World's Columbian Exposition =

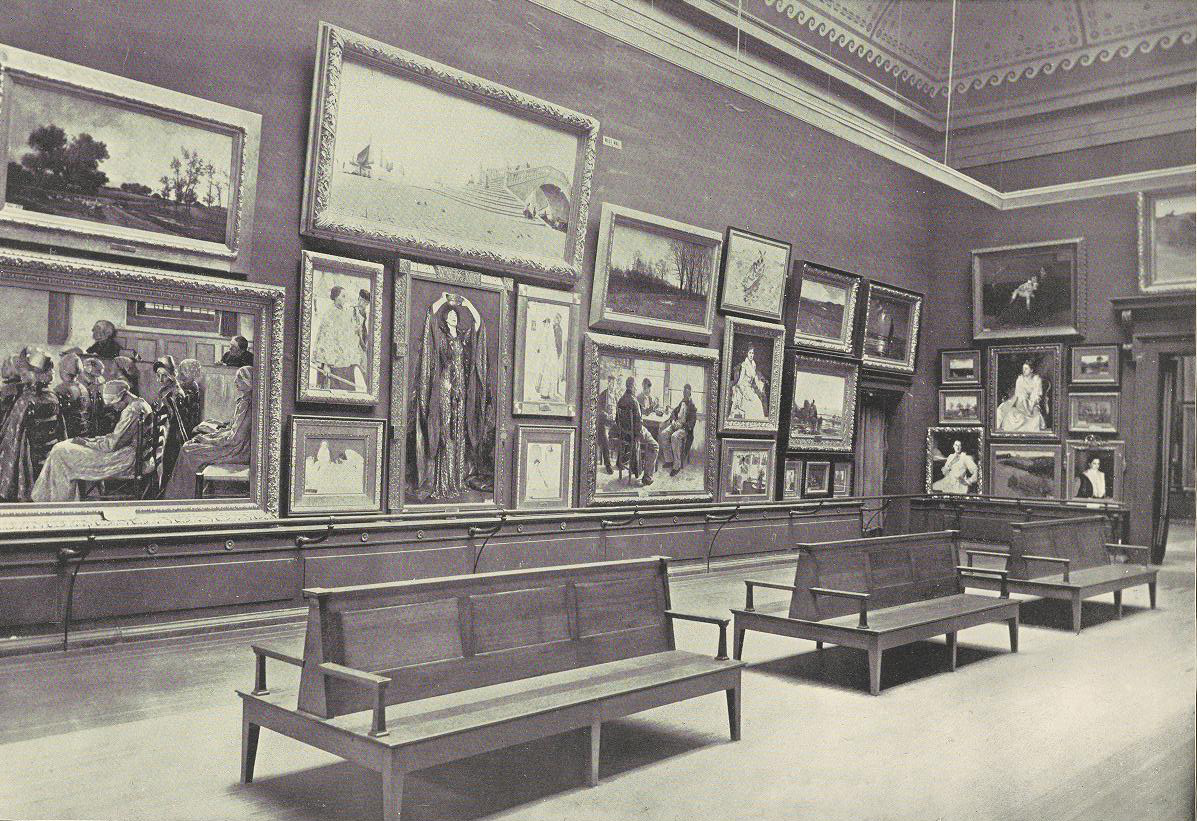
United States Section, Room 3.

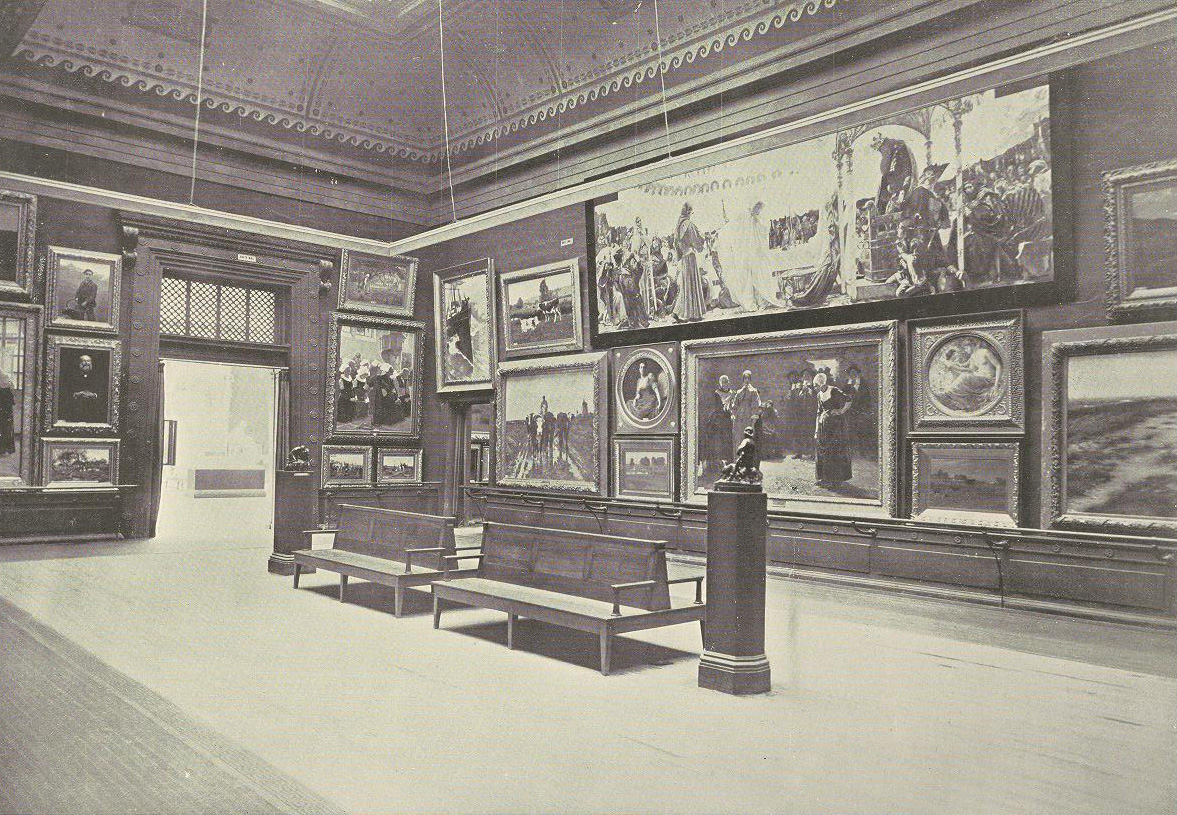
United States Section, Room 7.

Chicago hosted the 1893 World's Columbian Exposition, a world's fair commemorating the 400th anniversary of Christopher Columbus's arrival in the New World. Artists from the United States and 19 foreign countries exhibited at the Exposition. A complete list of the artists and works exhibited in the Palace of Fine Arts can be found here:

The Art Department's focus was on modern American painting, works painted in the 17 years since the 1876 Centennial Exposition. Hundreds of American painters submitted works, and more than 1,000 paintings in oil and more than 200 in watercolor were selected for exhibition in the Palace of Fine Arts. (Note: Art juries had been directed to select a maximum of 3 works per artist, but exceptions were made for prominent artists—George Inness exhibited 15 paintings, Winslow Homer and D. W. Tryon each exhibited 14, Kenyon Cox and Robert Vonnoh each exhibited 13, Thomas Eakins exhibited 10 (plus another in the Pennsylvania State Building).) Additional works—not in competition for medals—were exhibited in other Exposition buildings, including the Woman's Building and individual state buildings.

The tradition of the Paris Salon was to award a single gold medal (first place), a couple silver medals (second place), several bronze medals (third place), and numerous honorable mentions (fourth place) in each medium (oils, watercolor, sculpture, etc.). Instead of this tiered system with medals awarded for individual paintings, Exposition judges awarded one level of medals that was for an artist's whole exhibit. (Note: This medals system was unpopular with artists, who feared that "painters and sculptors whose work barely reached the mark" would receive "exactly the same distinction as artists who show masterpieces". The next American world's fair—the 1901 Pan-American Exposition in Buffalo, New York—returned to gold, silver and bronze medals and honorable mentions, but awarded them for an artist's whole exhibit.) Fifty-seven American painters received medals "for excellence" for works in oil, and 11 for works in watercolor.

Author Henry Davenport Northrop made a key observation:

The American artists are practically of three classes—those who have studied entirely in this country; those who have studied abroad, but have returned to America and partly shaken off the foreign influence; and those who have remained abroad, painting very much like the artists of the country in which they live.

The Exposition closed at the end of October 1893. Many of its buildings were destroyed in a July 1894 fire that swept through the vacant fairgrounds.

== About this list ==
The table below lists American painters who received special recognition, and/or whose exhibited works can be found in the Smithsonian Institution Research Information System database: Except where noted, the paintings were exhibited in the United States section of the Palace of Fine Arts and listed in the initial catalogue. A revised catalogue listed a small number of additional paintings. (Note: The initial catalogue had listed painters alphabetically, but their works could be spread throughout more than a dozen rooms in the Palace of Fine Arts. The revised catalogue listed painters alphabetically, and listed their paintings room-by-room and even wall-by-wall.) Images of the works have been added, where available, as well as their current whereabouts.

| Artist | Works Exhibited | Image | Medium | Year | Dimensions | Current Collection | Notes |
|---|---|---|---|---|---|---|---|
| Edwin Austin Abbey * Medal (oils) | Measure for Measure: Mariana (Scene from Shakespeare) | | Grisaille | 1889 | | Yale University Art Gallery | Study for a mural in the Boston Public Library |
| Adam Emory Albright | Morning-glories | | Oil on canvas | | | | |
| Henry Alexander | Chinese Interior | | Oil on canvas | 1892 | | | Possibly: Chinese Tea Room ? |
| Thomas Allen | Under the Willows | | Oil on canvas | ca.1892 | | Private collection, Nashville, Tennessee | |
| Thomas Allen | Thoroughbreds | | Oil on canvas | ca.1888 | | Private collection, San Francisco | |
| Thomas Allen | Coming Through the Woods | | Oil on canvas | | | | |
| Thomas Allen | Moonrise | | Oil on canvas | | | | |
| Thomas Allen | Portal of a Ruined Mission, San Jose, Texas | | Watercolor | 1878-79 | | Museum of Fine Arts, Boston | |
| Thomas Allen | Pasture by the Sea; Changing Pasture, Dartmoor | | Watercolors | | | | |
| David Maitland Armstrong | "White House," Pont Aven, Brittany | | Oil on canvas | 1878 | | Mount Holyoke College Art Museum, Holyoke, Massachusetts | |
| William Bliss Baker | Silence | | Oil on canvas | 1883 | | Private collection | |
| Edward Herbert Barnard | Portrait of E. H. B. (self-portrait) | | Oil on canvas | | | Private collection, San Antonio, Texas | |
| Edward Herbert Barnard | Mid-Day | | Oil on canvas | | | | |
| Cecilia Beaux | Last Days of Infancy | | Oil on canvas | 1883-85 | | Pennsylvania Academy of the Fine Arts | |
| Cecilia Beaux | Portrait of a Boy - Cecil Kent Drinker | | Oil on canvas | 1891 | | Philadelphia Museum of Art | |
| Cecilia Beaux | Woman's Building (Gallery of Honor): Twilight Confidences | | Oil on canvas | 1888 | | Georgia Museum of Art, Athens, Georgia | |
| Carol H. Beck | Portrait of Governor Robert Emory Pattison | | Oil on canvas | ca.1891 | | Pennsylvania Capitol Collection of Fine Art, Harrisburg, Pennsylvania | |
| James Carroll Beckwith | Mr. Isaacson | | Oil on canvas | 1889 | | Wadsworth Athenaeum, Hartford, Connecticut | |
| James Carroll Beckwith | Portrait of Miss E.A.H. (Elisa Adams Hall) | | Oil on canvas | | | | |
| James Carroll Beckwith | Manufactures and Liberal Arts Building: The Spirit of Electricity; The Dynamo; Telephone; Arc Light; The Telegraph | | Murals | | | | Destroyed in the July 1894 fire |
| Edward August Bell | Portrait of a Lady in Gray | | Oil on canvas | 1889 | | Brooks Museum of Art, Memphis, Tennessee | |
| Enella Benedict | Brittany Children | | Oil on canvas | 1892 | | National Museum of Women in the Arts | |
| Enella Benedict | Woman's Building (Board Room): Old Stories | | Oil on canvas | | | | |
| Frank W. Benson * Medal (oils) | Figure in White (the artist's sister Georgiana) | | Oil on canvas | 1888 | | | Ex collection: Salem (Massachusetts) Public Library; Sold at Skinner Auctions, Boston, 23 January 2015, Lot 495. |
| Frank W. Benson * Medal (oils) | Portrait in White (Portrait of My Wife) (Ellen Perry Peirson Benson) | | Oil on canvas | 1889 | | National Gallery of Art | |
| Frank W. Benson * Medal (oils) | Girl in a Red Shawl (Georgiana Benson) | | Oil on canvas | 1890 | | Museum of Fine Arts, Boston | |
| Daniel Folger Bigelow | Lake Champlain and the Adirondacks | | Oil on canvas | | | | |
| Henry Bisbing * Medal (oils) | Afternoon in the Meadows | | Oil on canvas | 1892 | | | |
| Henry Bisbing * Medal (oils) | On the River Bank | | Oil on canvas | 1889 | | | |
| Henry Bisbing * Medal (oils) | Lapsing Waves on Quiet Shore | | Oil on canvas | 1892 | | J. Franklin Fine Art, Inc. Seattle, Washington | |
| Ralph Albert Blakelock | Moonlight (A Waterfall, Moonlight) | | Oil on canvas | ca.1886 | | Metropolitan Museum of Art | |
| Ralph Albert Blakelock | Near Cloverdale | | Oil on canvas | | | | |
| Edwin Howland Blashfield * Medal (oils) | Christmas Bells | | Oil on canvas | 1891 | | Brooklyn Museum | |
| Edwin Howland Blashfield * Medal (oils) | Angel with the Flaming Sword | | Oil on canvas | 1890-91 | | Church of the Ascension, Fifth Avenue, Manhattan, NYC | |
| Edwin Howland Blashfield * Medal (oils) | Lady in a Satin Gown (the artist's wife, Evangeline) | | Oil on canvas | 1889 | | Museum of Fine Arts Boston | |
| Edwin Howland Blashfield * Medal (oils) | Manufactures and Liberal Arts Building: Arts of Metal Working; The Armorer's Craft; The Brass Founder; The Iron Worker | | Murals | | | | Destroyed in the July 1894 fire |
| Frank Myers Boggs | Fishing Boats Going Out, Isigny, France | | Oil on canvas | | | | |
| Frank Myers Boggs | The Brooklyn Bridge | | Oil on canvas | ca.1889 | | | |
| Susan H. Bradley | Mount Monadnock, New Hampshire | | Watercolor | | | | |
| Christine S. Bredin | A Peasant Woman, Dachau, Bavaria | | Watercolor | | | | |
| Christine S. Bredin | Woman's Building (Cincinnati Room): Christmas Morning | | | | | | |
| Charles Bregler | Portrait of a Woman (the artist's grandmother) | | Oil on canvas | | | | |
| Fidelia Bridges | In an Old Orchard | | Watercolor | | | | |
| Frederick Arthur Bridgman | In a Villa at El Biar, Algiers | | Oil on canvas | 1889 | | | |
| Frederick Arthur Bridgman | Day Dreams | | Oil on canvas | | | | |
| Frederick Arthur Bridgman | Passage of the Red Sea | | Oil on canvas | ca.1888 | | Columbia University, Manhattan, NYC | |
| Frederick Arthur Bridgman | Women at the Mosque, Algiers | | Oil on canvas | 1887 | | | |
| Frederick Arthur Bridgman | Fellahine and Child—The Bath, Cairo | | Oil on canvas | ca.1892 | | Private collection, Princeton, New Jersey | |
| Frederick Arthur Bridgman | The Morning Bath—Coast of Algiers | | Oil on canvas | 1891 | | | |
| Frederick Arthur Bridgman | A Hot Day at Mustapha, Algiers | | Oil on canvas | | | Private collection, London, UK | |
| John Bunyan Bristol | Mount Chocorua, New Hampshire | | Oil on canvas | | | | |
| John Appleton Brown | Springtime | | Oil on canvas | | | Private collection | |
| John George Brown | Pull for the Shore | | Oil on canvas | 1878 | | Chrysler Museum of Art; Norfolk, Virginia | |
| John George Brown | A Card Trick | | Oil on canvas | 1892 | | Joslyn Art Museum, Omaha, Nebraska | |
| John George Brown | Homeward Bound | | Oil on canvas | c.1878 | | Historic New England, Boston, Massachusetts | |
| John George Brown | Training the Dog | | Oil on canvas | | | Washington and Lee University, Lexington, Virginia | |
| John George Brown | The Stump Speech | | Oil on canvas | ca.1880s | | Private collection | |
| John George Brown | When We Were Girls | | Oil on canvas | ca.1890 | | | |
| John George Brown | At the Old Cottage | | Oil on canvas | | | | |
| John George Brown | A Wall Flower | | Watercolor | | | | |
| Matilda Browne | An Unwilling Model | | Oil on canvas | ca.1892 | 15.25 x 18.25 in 39 x 46 cm | Ex collection: Florence Griswold Museum, Old Lyme, CT | Bought at Rago auction, May 18, 2023 |
| Charles Francis Browne | On the Oise, France (Auvers L'Oise) | | Oil on canvas | 1891 | | | Sold at Skinner Auctions, Boston, 16 November 2011, Lot 376. |
| Charles Francis Browne | Sand Dunes of Drummadoon, Arran; Old Poplar Trees; Back from the Beach, Cape Ann | | Oil on canvas | | | | |
| George de Forest Brush * Medal (oils) | The Indian and the Lily | | Oil on canvas | 1887 | 20.25 x 19.875 in 53.3 x 50.8 cm | Crystal Bridges Museum of American Art, Bentonville, Arkansas | |
| George de Forest Brush * Medal (oils) | The Sculptor and the King | | Oil on canvas | 1888 | 20 x 36 in 50.8 x 91.4 cm | Portland Art Museum | |
| George de Forest Brush * Medal (oils) | The Head Dress (The Shield Maker) | | Oil on canvas | 1890 | 10.875 x 16.125 in 27.6 x 40.96 cm | Tuscaloosa Museum of Art, Tuscaloosa, Alabama | |
| George de Forest Brush * Medal (oils) | Union League Building: Mother and Child | | Oil on canvas | 1892 | 44.5 x 41.5 in 113 x 105.4 cm | Addison Gallery of American Art, Phillips Academy, Andover, Massachusetts | |
| Margaret Lesley Bush-Brown | Fragment of a Mural Decoration | | Oil on canvas | | | | |
| Margaret Lesley Bush-Brown | Pennsylvania State Building: Spring | | Mural | | | | |
| George Bernard Butler | Girl with Tambourine | | Oil on canvas | | | Barnard College, Manhattan, NYC | |
| Herbert E. Butler | Hard Times | | Oil on canvas | | | | |
| Howard Russell Butler | The Seaweed Gatherers (Les ramasseurs de varech) | | Oil on canvas | 1886 | | Smithsonian American Art Museum | |
| Howard Russell Butler | Church of Guadalupe, Aguas Calientes, Mexico | | Oil on canvas | ca.1890 | | Private collection | |
| Henry N. Cady | Sunset at Narragansett Pier | | Oil on canvas | 1892 | | Private collection | |
| Neville Cain | The Satyr and the Traveler | | Oil on canvas | ca.1890 | | | |
| Neville Cain | Narcissus | | Oil on canvas | | | | |
| Katharine Augusta Carl | Head of a Man | | Oil on canvas | | | | |
| Katharine Augusta Carl | Woman's Building (Rotunda): Odalisque | | Oil on canvas | | | | |
| Katharine Augusta Carl | Woman's Building (Rotunda): Soap Bubbles | | Oil on canvas | | | | |
| Mary Cassatt | Woman's Building: Modern Woman: Young Women Plucking the Fruits of Knowledge or Science; Young Girls Pursuing Fame; Arts, Music, Dancing | | Murals | 1893 | | | Plucking the Fruits of Knowledge (detail): The 3-part mural was 14 ft (4.3 m) tall and 58 ft (17.7 m) long. |
| Mary Cassatt | Woman's Building (Gallery of Honor): The Young Mother | | Pastel | 1888 | | Art Institute of Chicago | Gift of Mrs. Potter Palmer |
| Mary Cassatt | Woman's Building: Portrait of a Lady; The Bath | | | | | | |
| William Merritt Chase | Lady in Pink (Mariette Leslie Cotton) | | Oil on canvas | 1889 | | Westmoreland Museum of American Art, Greensburg, Pennsylvania | |
| William Merritt Chase | Alice - A Portrait (the artist's daughter) | | Oil on canvas | ca.1892 | | Art Institute of Chicago | |
| William Merritt Chase | Meditation - A Portrait (the artist's wife) | | Oil on canvas | 1885 | | Private collection | |
| William Merritt Chase | Lilliputian Boats in the Park (Toy Boats in Central Park) | | Oil on panel | ca.1888 | | Private collection | |
| William Merritt Chase | Portrait of Miss L. (Angelica Hamilton Lawrence) | | Oil on canvas | 1892 | | Private collection | |
| William Merritt Chase | Portrait of Mrs. E. (Lydia Field Emmet) | | Oil on canvas | 1892 | | Brooklyn Museum | |
| Frederick Stuart Church * Medal (oils) | Knowledge Is Power | | Oil on canvas | 1889 | | Grand Rapids Public Library, Grand Rapids, Michigan | |
| Frederick Stuart Church * Medal (oils) | The Viking's Daughter | | Oil on canvas | 1887 | | Smithsonian American Art Museum | |
| Frederick Stuart Church * Medal (oils) | Pandora | | Watercolor | | | | |
| Thomas Shields Clarke * Medal (oils) | A Fool's Fool | | Oil on canvas | ca.1887 | | Pennsylvania Academy of the Fine Arts | |
| Thomas Shields Clarke * Medal (oils) | A Gondola Girl | | Oil on canvas | 1892 | | Private collection, Wynnewood, Pennsylvania | |
| Thomas Shields Clarke * Medal (oils) | Night Market, Morocco | | Oil on canvas | ca.1892 | | | Ex collection: Philadelphia Art Club |
| Thomas Shields Clarke * Medal (oils) | Portrait of Madame d' E. | | Oil on canvas | ca.1890 | | | |
| Thomas Shields Clarke * Medal (oils) | Morning, Noon and Night (Cartoon for a lunette stained glass window) | | Oil on canvas | | | | |
| Gabrielle de Veaux Clements | Andarina | | Oil on canvas | | | | |
| Gabrielle de Veaux Clements | Pennsylvania State Building: Harvest | | Mural | 1893 | | Cape Ann Museum, Gloucester, Massachusetts | |
| Benjamin West Clinedinst | Monsieur's Mail | | Oil on canvas | | | | |
| Benjamin West Clinedinst | The Water Colorist | | Oil on canvas | ca.1891 | | | |
| Elizabeth Coffin | Hanging the Net | | Oil on canvas | 1892 | | | Winner of the National Academy of Design's 1892 Norman; W. Dodge Prize for the best picture by a woman. |
| Esther Coffin | Grapes; Madison Square Tower at Night | | Watercolor | | | | |
| William Anderson Coffin | A Pennsylvania Farm After a Thunder Shower; Moonlight in Harvest; Twilight; Early Morning; Evening; September Breeze | | Oil on canvas | | | | |
| George W. Cohen | The Reading (A Tale of the Sea) | | Oil on canvas | | | | |
| Alfred Quinton Collins | Portrait of Joe Evans | | Oil on canvas | ca.1891-92 | | Art Students' League of New York | |
| Samuel Colman | Mexican Hancienda | | Oil on canvas | | | | |
| Samuel Colman | Mt. Tacoma from Puget Sound | | Oil on canvas | | | | |
| Samuel Colman | Inner Gorge of the Grand Canyon of the Colorado | | Oil on canvas | | | | |
| Samuel Colman | Mosque at Tlemcin, Algeria | | Watercolor | 1870 | | New York Public Library, Manhattan, NYC | |
| Samuel Colman | Ruins of a Mosque, Tlemcin, Algeria; At the Fountain | | Watercolor | | | | |
| Charlotte B. Coman | A Stony Brook; The Road to Town, Florida | | Oil on canvas | | | | |
| Charlotte B. Coman | Woman's Building (Rotunda): Thistledown | | | | | | |
| Lucy Scarborough Conant | The Orchid Meadow | | Oil on canvas | | | | |
| Lucy Scarborough Conant | Nasturtiums | | Watercolor | | | | |
| Eanger Irving Couse | Milking Time | | Oil on canvas | 1892 | | Family of the artist | |
| Eanger Irving Couse | My First Born | | Oil on canvas | ca.1890 | | | |
| Kenyon Cox * Medal (oils) | Portrait of Louise H. King - the Artist's Wife | | Oil on canvas | 1891 | 38.625 x 17.875 in 98.11 x 45.4 cm | Smithsonian American Art Museum | |
| Kenyon Cox * Medal (oils) | An Eclogue | | Oil on canvas | 1890 | 48 x 60.5 in 121.9 x 153.7 cm | Smithsonian American Art Museum | |
| Kenyon Cox * Medal (oils) | May | | Oil on canvas | 1890 | 15.5 x 30 in 39.37 x 76.2 cm | A.J. Kollar Fine Art, Seattle, Washington | |
| Kenyon Cox * Medal (oils) | Diana | | Oil on canvas | ca.1890 | 30 x 18.125 in 76.2 x 46.04 cm | Chazen Museum of Art, University of Wisconsin, Madison | |
| Kenyon Cox * Medal (oils) | Echo | | Oil on canvas | 1892 | 35.875 x 29.75; 90.8 x 75.7 cm | Smithsonian American Art Museum | |
| Kenyon Cox * Medal (oils) | Painting and Poetry | | Oil on canvas | 1886 | 18 x 24 in 45.9 x 61.1 cm | Brooklyn Museum | Part of the "Blessed Damosel" series. |
| Kenyon Cox * Medal (oils) | Portrait of Augustus Saint-Gaudens | | Oil on canvas | 1887; 1908 | 33.5 x 47.125 in 85.1 x 119.1 cm | Metropolitan Museum of Art | The original portrait was lost in a fire. Cox painted this replica in 1908. |
| Kenyon Cox * Medal (oils) | Flying Shadows | | Oil on canvas | 1883 | 30 x 36.25 in 76.2 x 92.1 cm | National Gallery of Art | |
| Kenyon Cox * Medal (oils) | A Solo - The Harp Player | | Oil on canvas | 1888 | 30 x 17.125 in 76.2 x 45.4 cm | Metropolitan Museum of Art | |
| Kenyon Cox * Medal (oils) | The Pursuit of the Ideal | | Oil on canvas | 1891 | | | Destroyed |
| Kenyon Cox * Medal (oils) | Music | | Oil on canvas | | | | |
| Kenyon Cox * Medal (oils) | A Vision of Moonrise | | Oil on canvas | ca.1891 | | | |
| Kenyon Cox * Medal (oils) | Portrait of Roger Deering (Age Five) | | Oil on canvas | 1889 | | Deering Library, Northwestern University | |
| Kenyon Cox * Medal (oils) | Manufactures and Liberal Arts Building: Steel Working; Ceramic Painting; Building; Spinning | | Murals | | | | Destroyed in the July 1894 fire |
| Louise King Cox | A Rondel | | Oil on canvas | 1892 | 18 x 38.5 in 45.8 x 97.9 cm | High Museum of Art; Atlanta, Georgia | |
| Louise King Cox | The Lotus Eaters | | Oil on canvas | ca.1887 | | | |
| Louise King Cox | Woman's Building: Suggestion for Reredos | | Watercolor | | | | |
| Bruce Crane | The Harvest Field (Landscape—The Harvest) | | Oil on canvas | | | National Academy of Design, Manhattan, NYC | |
| Charles Courtney Curran * Medal (oils) | A Breezy Day | | Oil on canvas | 1887 | | Pennsylvania Academy of the Fine Arts | |
| Charles Courtney Curran * Medal (oils) | Sealing the Letter | | Oil on canvas | | | | |
| Charles Courtney Curran * Medal (oils) | Winter Morning in a Barnyard | | Oil on canvas | | | | |
| Charles Courtney Curran * Medal (oils) | A Cabbage Garden | | Oil on canvas | 1887 | | | |
| Charles Courtney Curran * Medal (oils) | Early Morning in June | | Oil on canvas | 1891 | | | |
| Charles Courtney Curran * Medal (oils) | The Iris Bed | | Oil on canvas | 1891 | | | |
| Charles Courtney Curran * Medal (oils) | Salle de la Venus de Milo | | Oil on canvas | 1889 | | | |
| Charles Courtney Curran * Medal (oils) | Winter Fog; A Corner in a Barnyard; Under the Awning; A Dream | | Oil on canvas | | | | |
| Charles Courtney Curran * Medal (oils) | Cupid Asleep | | Watercolor | | | | |
| William Turner Dannat | Spanish Women (Spanish Dancers) | | Oil on canvas | ca.1892 | | | |
| Charles Harold Davis * Medal (oils) | Summer Morning | | Oil on canvas | | | Smithsonian American Art Museum | |
| Charles Harold Davis * Medal (oils) | In April | | Oil on canvas | | | Muskegon Museum of Art, Muskegon, Michigan | |
| Charles Harold Davis * Medal (oils) | Abandoned | | Oil on canvas | | | Omaha Public Library, Omaha, Nebraska | |
| Charles Harold Davis * Medal (oils) | A Winter Evening; On the New England Coast; The Valley | | Oil on canvas | | | | |
| Walter Lofthouse Dean | The Open Sea | | Oil on canvas | 1890 | | Private collection, Massachusetts | |
| Walter Lofthouse Dean | Peace (The White Squadron in Boston Harbor) | | Oil on canvas | 1891 | | U.S. House of Representatives Art Collection; Cannon House Office Building, Washington, D.C. | |
| Walter Lofthouse Dean | The Seiner's Return | | Oil on canvas | 1892 | | Private collection, Massachusetts | |
| Lockwood de Forest | Moonrise over the Ruins of Palmyra | | Oil on canvas | 1891 | | Private collection | |
| Edwin Willard Deming | The Mourning Brave | | Oil on canvas | ca.1892 | | Smithsonian American Art Museum | |
| Herbert Denman | The Trio | | Oil on canvas | 1886 | | Brooklyn Museum | |
| Louis P. Dessar * Medal (oils) | Evening at Longpre | | Oil on canvas | 1892 | | Montclair Art Museum, Montclair, New Jersey | |
| Louis P. Dessar * Medal (oils) | The Fishermen's Departure | | Oil on canvas | 1891 | | Omaha Public Library, Omaha, Nebraska | |
| Louis P. Dessar * Medal (oils) | Study—French Peasant Girl's Head | | Oil on canvas | | | | |
| Thomas Dewing * Medal (oils) | A Musician | | Oil on canvas | 1891 | | Freer Gallery of Art, Washington, D.C. | |
| Thomas Dewing * Medal (oils) | Summer | | Oil on canvas | 1890 | | Smithsonian American Art Museum | |
| Thomas Dewing * Medal (oils) | The Blue Dress | | Oil on canvas | 1892 | | Freer Gallery of Art, Washington, D.C. | |
| Thomas Dewing * Medal (oils) | The Days | | Oil on canvas | 1887 | | Wadsworth Athenaeum, Hartford, Connecticut | |
| Thomas Dewing * Medal (oils) | Portrait of William Merritt Chase | | Oil on canvas | 1890 | | Cincinnati Art Museum | |
| Thomas Dewing * Medal (oils) | Portrait of Bessie Springs Smith (Mrs. Stanford White) | | Oil on canvas | 1886 | | Private collection | |
| Thomas Dewing * Medal (oils) | Portrait (Ella Emmet) | | Oil on canvas | ca.1888-89 | | Private collection | |
| Julia McEntee Dillon | Peonies | | Oil on canvas | ca.1890 | | | |
| Sarah Paxton Ball Dodson | Saint Thekla | | Oil on canvas | 1891 | | Smithsonian American Art Museum | |
| Sarah Paxton Ball Dodson | Honey of the Hymettus | | Oil on canvas | 1891 | | | |
| Sarah Paxton Ball Dodson | The Morning Stars | | Oil on canvas | 1887 | | Private collection | |
| Sarah Paxton Ball Dodson | Pennsylvania State Building: Pax Patriae | | Mural | 1893 | | | |
| Pauline A. Dohn (Rudolph) | What the Storks Brought | | Oil on canvas | ca.1892 | | | |
| Pauline A. Dohn (Rudolph) | Illinois State Building: Industrial Arts | | Mural | | | | |
| Pauline A. Dohn (Rudolph) | Woman's Building: A Letter from the Fatherland | | | | | | |
| Pauline A. Dohn (Rudolph) | Woman's Building (Rotunda): Portrait of Mrs. M.W. Means | | | | | | |
| Gaines Ruger Donoho * Medal (oils) | La Marcellerie | | Oil on canvas | 1881 | | Brooklyn Museum | |
| Gaines Ruger Donoho * Medal (oils) | Explorers | | Oil on canvas | ca.1892 | | | |
| Arthur Wesley Dow | Marsh Islands | | Oil on canvas | | | | Dow painted several works with this title. |
| Mattie Dubé | Pumpkins and Onions | | Oil on canvas | 1891 | | Greenville County Museum of Art, Greenville, South Carolina | |
| Frank DuMond | Monastic Life (In a Monastery Garden) | | Oil on canvas | ca.1893 | | Private collection, New York City | |
| Frank DuMond | The Holy Family | | Oil on canvas | 1890 | | St. Paul's Church on the Green, Norwalk, Connecticut | |
| Frank DuMond | Christ and the Fishermen | | Oil on canvas | 1891 | | Private collection | |
| Frederick Melville DuMond | A Legend of the Desert (Hagar and Ishmael) | | Oil on canvas | 1892 | | Los Angeles County Museum of Art | |
| John Ward Dunsmore | Mozart | | Oil on canvas | | | Wagnalls Memorial Library, Lithopolis, Ohio | |
| Fannie Eliza Duvall | Chrysanthemum Garden in California | | Oil on canvas | 1891 | | | Destroyed in a 1991 fire. |
| Fannie Eliza Duvall | Study of Onions | | Oil on canvas | | | | |
| Frank Duveneck * Medal (oils) | Portrait of William Adams | | Oil on canvas | 1874 | | Milwaukee Art Museum | |
| Susan Macdowell Eakins | Reflection | | Oil on canvas | | | | Possibly: Woman Seated ? |
| Thomas Eakins * Medal (oils) | The Agnew Clinic | | Oil on canvas | 1889 | 84.2 x 118.1 in 214 x 300 cm | University of Pennsylvania, on loan to Philadelphia Museum of Art | |
| Thomas Eakins * Medal (oils) | Portrait of George S. Barker | | Oil on canvas | 1886 | Original: 60 x 40 in 152.4 x 101.6 cm Cut down: 24 x 20 in 61.0 x 50.8 cm | Mitchell Museum at Cedarhurst, Mount Vernon, Illinois | Cut down to a head-and-bust (by 1945): |
| Thomas Eakins * Medal (oils) | The Crucifixion | | Oil on canvas | 1880 | 95.75 x 54 in 243.8 x 137.2 cm | Philadelphia Museum of Art | |
| Thomas Eakins * Medal (oils) | The Gross Clinic | | Oil on canvas | 1876 | 95.75 x 77.75 in 244 x 198.3 cm | Co-owned by Philadelphia Museum of Art and Pennsylvania Academy of the Fine Arts | |
| Thomas Eakins * Medal (oils) | Home Ranch | | Oil on canvas | 1888 | 24 x 20 in 61 x 50.8 cm | Philadelphia Museum of Art | |
| Thomas Eakins * Medal (oils) | Portrait of William D. Marks | | Oil on canvas | 1886 | 75.75 x 54 in 193 x 137.2 cm | Washington University in St. Louis Gallery of Art, St. Louis, Missouri | |
| Thomas Eakins * Medal (oils) | Mending the Net | | Oil on canvas | 1881 | 32.1 x 45.1 in 81.6 x 114.6 cm | Philadelphia Museum of Art | |
| Thomas Eakins * Medal (oils) | The Sculptor - Portrait of William R. O'Donovan | | Oil on canvas | ca.1891-92 | | | Lost, probably destroyed |
| Thomas Eakins * Medal (oils) | Portrait of Amelia Van Buren | | Oil on canvas | c.1891 | 44.8 x 31.8 in 114 x 81 cm | Phillips Collection, Washington, D.C. | |
| Thomas Eakins * Medal (oils) | The Writing Master - Portrait of the Artist's Father | | Oil on canvas | 1882 | 30 x 34.2 in 76.2 x 87 cm | Metropolitan Museum of Art | |
| Thomas Eakins * Medal (oils) | Pennsylvania State Building: The Concert Singer | | Oil on canvas | 1890-92 | 75.17 x 54.29 in 190.96 x 137.9 cm | Philadelphia Museum of Art | |
| Lydia Field Emmet | The Mere | | Oil on canvas | | | | Possibly: Girl at Mirror ? |
| Lydia Field Emmet | Noonday | | Oil on canvas | | | | |
| Lydia Field Emmet | Woman's Building: Art, Science, and Imagination | | Mural | | | | |
| John Joseph Enneking | Salting Sheep | | Oil on canvas | 1892 | | Private collection | |
| John Joseph Enneking | South Duxbury Clam Digger | | Oil on canvas | 1892 | | Scripps College, Claremont, California | |
| John Joseph Enneking | October Twilight in New England | | Oil on canvas | ca.1891 | | | |
| John Joseph Enneking | Autumn Afternoon | | Oil on canvas | | | | |
| John Joseph Enneking | November | | Oil on canvas | | | | |
| Lucia Fairchild | Portrait of a Boy with a Hat (the artist's brother Neil) | | Oil on canvas | 1891 | | Pocumtuck Valley Memorial Association, Deerfield, Massachusetts | |
| Lucia Fairchild | Woman's Building: Women of Plymouth | | Mural | | | | |
| Henry Farny | Got Him | | Watercolor | | | | |
| Henry Farny | Mountain Trail | | Watercolor | | | | |
| Henry Farny | A Sioux Camp | | Watercolor | | | | |
| Stephen James Ferris | Fortuny Lying in State | | Watercolor | 1874 | | | |
| Mark Fisher * Medal (oils) | Cows in the Orchard | | Oil on canvas | | | Tate Britain, London, UK | |
| Mark Fisher * Medal (oils) | A Hampshire Dairy; Cattle Crossing a Stream; Evening; A Small Holding; Timber Wagon, Normandy; Moonrise; Teste Valley Meadows; Sorting the Flock; Summer Afternoon; Orchard, Normandy | | Oil on canvas | | | | |
| Charles Noel Flagg | Mark Twain | | Oil on canvas | 1890 | | Metropolitan Museum of Art | |
| Harriet Campbell Foss | The Flower Maker | | Oil on canvas | 1892 | | Private collection | |
| Ben Foster * Medal (oils) | First Days of Spring (Early Spring on Staten Island) | | Oil on canvas | | | | Possibly: Early Springtime ? |
| Ben Foster * Medal (oils) | The Returning Flock; A Maine Hillside; In Fontainebleau Forest | | Oil on canvas | | | | |
| Ben Foster * Medal (oils) | Night; The Shepherds; A Swine Herd | | Watercolor | | | | |
| Frank Fowler | Portrait of Walter Shirlaw | | Oil on canvas | 1890 | | National Academy of Design, Manhattan, NYC | |
| Frank Fowler | Lady in White—Portrait of the Artist's Wife | | Oil on canvas | ca.1889 | | | Destroyed |
| Frank Fowler | Portrait—Girl in Black | | Oil on canvas | | | | |
| Frank Fowler | Portrait (Goodrich) | | Oil on canvas | | | | |
| Frank Fowler | Portrait (Dr. William B. Neftel) | | Oil on canvas | | | Private collection, Tallahassee, Florida | |
| Frank Fowler | 8 studies for a ceiling mural, Hotel Waldorf (demolished 1929) | | Oil | 1893 | | | |
| August Franzen * Medal (watercolors) | Afternoon; Before the Rain | | Watercolor | | | | |
| Frederick Warren Freer * Medal (oils) | Portrait of a Lady in Black (the artist's wife) | | Oil on canvas | 1885 | | Nassau County Museum of Art, Roslyn Harbor, New York | |
| Frederick Warren Freer * Medal (oils) | Portrait (Martha Keenan?) (Margaret Cecilia Keenan?) | | Oil on canvas | 1887 | | | |
| Frederick Warren Freer * Medal (oils) | The Gold Fish | | Oil on canvas | ca.1885 | | Private collection, Chicago, Illinois | |
| John Hemming Fry | Labor | | Oil on canvas | | | | |
| Elizabeth Jane Gardner (Bouguereau) | Soap Bubbles | | Oil on canvas | ca.1891 | | Private collection, Richmond, Virginia | |
| Elizabeth Jane Gardner (Bouguereau) | At the Water's Edge | | Oil on canvas | ca.1884 | | | |
| Ignaz Gaugengigl | The Hat | | Oil on panel | | | Private collection, Chevy Chase, Maryland | |
| Ignaz Gaugengigl | The Rehearsal (The Quartette) | | Oil on canvas | 1893 | | | |
| Ignaz Gaugengigl | The Manuscript | | Oil on panel | 1889 | | Private collection, Norwich, Connecticut | |
| Ignaz Gaugengigl | The Love Song | | Oil on panel | 1892 | | The Tavern Club, Boston, Massachusetts | |
| Gilbert Gaul * Medal (oils) | Charging the Battery | | Oil on canvas | 1882 | | New York Historical Society, Manhattan, NYC | |
| Gilbert Gaul * Medal (oils) | Silenced | | Oil on canvas | 1882-83 | | | |
| Walter Gay | A Simple Song (A Gregorian Chant) | | Oil on canvas | 1884 | | | |
| Walter Gay | Charity | | Oil on canvas | 1889 | | Private collection | |
| Walter Gay | Dominican Monk | | Oil on canvas | 1888 | | Private collection | |
| Walter Gay | A Mass in Brittany | | Oil on canvas | ca.1892 | | | |
| William Hamilton Gibson | A Honey Dew Picnic | | Mixed media | 1896? | | Gunn Memorial Library, Washington, Connecticut | |
| William Hamilton Gibson | Upland Meadows; Rain Clouds; September Rain; Russet Meadows; Landscape; On the Canal at Dort; A Connecticut Hamlet; Moonlight in Opelousas | | Watercolors | | | | |
| Robert Swain Gifford | The Seaweed Gathers | | Oil on canvas | 1886 | | Washington and Lee University, Lexington, Virginia | |
| Robert Swain Gifford | Salt Works at Padanarum | | Oil on canvas | | | | |
| Robert Swain Gifford | Autumn | | Oil on canvas | 1888 | | Allen Memorial Art Museum, Oberlin College, Oberlin, Ohio | |
| Robert Swain Gifford | Landscape | | Oil on canvas | 1878 | | National Academy of Design, Manhattan, NYC | |
| Robert Swain Gifford | Moorlands | | Oil on canvas | ca.1892-93 | | New Bedford Whaling Museum, New Bedford, Massachusetts | |
| Robert Swain Gifford | Nashawena (Nashawena Island) | | Oil on canvas | ca.1887 | | | |
| Robert Swain Gifford | The Cove Road, Naushon Island, Massachusetts | | Oil on canvas | 1888 | | | |
| Robert Swain Gifford | Sand Dunes; Over the Summer Sea; Telegraph Station at Sandy Hook; The Rock of Gibraltar | | Oil on canvas | | | | |
| Robert Swain Gifford | A Tile Kiln on the Northern Canal; A Summer Afternoon, New England; The Mountains of Chobet el Akra; Salt Works of Baltz, France | | Watercolor | | | | |
| Kathleen Honora Greatorex * Medal (watercolors) | Corner of the Strozzi Palace, Florence | | Watercolor | | | | |
| Kathleen Honora Greatorex * Medal (watercolors) | Carnival | | Watercolor | | | | |
| Kathleen Honora Greatorex * Medal (watercolors) | Woman's Building (Rotunda): Bateau Lavoir-Moret | | Watercolor | 1886 | | | |
| Frank Russell Green | My Sweetheart (Woman with a Black Hat) | | Oil on canvas | | | Private collection | |
| Peter Alfred Gross | Essegney near Charmes, Voyages | | Oil on canvas | 1892 | | Allentown Art Museum, Allentown, Pennsylvania | |
| Peter Alfred Gross | Road to Spring, Liverdun | | Oil on canvas | c.1890 | | Private collection, Allentown, Pennsylvania | |
| Peter Alfred Gross | A Rainy Day | | Oil on canvas | | | | |
| Oliver Dennett Grover | Thy Will Be Done | | Oil on canvas | 1892 | | | |
| Jules Guérin | Early Morning in a Village Street, Kentucky | | Watercolor | | | | |
| Carl Gutherz | Light of the Incarnation | | Oil on canvas | 1888 | | Brooks Museum of Art, Memphis, Tennessee | A large canvas, about 6 x 8 ft, Gutherz's asking price was $10,000. |
| Carl Gutherz | Arcessita ab Angelis (Borne Away by Angels) | | Oil on canvas | 1889 | | Brooks Museum of Art, Memphis, Tennessee | |
| Carl Gutherz | Temptation of St. Anthony | | Oil on canvas | 1890 | | Ogden Museum of Southern Art, New Orleans, Louisiana | |
| Ellen Day Hale | Bessy | | Oil on canvas | 1890 | | Private collection | |
| Ellen Day Hale | Under the Vine | | Oil on canvas | | | | |
| John McLure Hamilton | The Right Hon. William Ewart Gladstone at Downing Street | | Oil on canvas | 1893 | | Pennsylvania Academy of the Fine Arts | |
| John McLure Hamilton | The Knitting Lesson | | Oil on canvas | 1892 | | | |
| Robert Gordon Hardie | Portrait of the Artist's Wife | | Oil on canvas | | | Private collection, Guilford, Connecticut | |
| Charles Xavier Harris | The Mowers | | Oil on canvas | 1885 | | Lagakos-Turak Gallery, Philadelphia, Pennsylvania | Possibly: The Moulders ? |
| Alexander Harrison | In Arcadia | | Oil on canvas | 1886 | | Musée d'Orsay, Paris, France | |
| Alexander Harrison | Marine | | Oil on canvas | ca.1892-93 | | Musée des beaux-arts de Quimper, Brittany, France | |
| Alexander Harrison | Twilight | | Oil on canvas | 1885 | | Kemper Art Museum, Washington University in St. Louis, St. Louis, Missouri | Ex collection: St. Louis Art Museum |
| Alexander Harrison | The Bathers (The Bathers at the Lake) | | Oil on canvas | | | Private collection | |
| Alexander Harrison | Misty Morning | | Oil on canvas | ca.1882 | | | |
| Alexander Harrison | The Amateurs | | Oil on canvas | 1882-83 | | Brauer Museum of Art, Valparaiso University, Valparaiso, Indiana | |
| Birge Harrison | The Surprise (in the Forest of Compeigne) | | Oil on canvas | 1888 | | | |
| Birge Harrison | The Return of the Mayflower | | Oil on canvas | 1886 | | Private collection | |
| James Taylor Harwood | Preparing Dinner (Preparations for Dinner) | | Oil on canvas | 1891 | | Museum of Fine Arts, University of Utah—Union | |
| Du Bois Fenelon Hasbrouck | A Winter Morning in the Catskills | | Oil on canvas | 1890 | | | |
| Childe Hassam * Medal (oils) * Medal (watercolors) | Grand Prix Day | | Oil on canvas | 1887 | | New Britain Museum of American Art, New Britain, Connecticut | |
| Childe Hassam * Medal (oils) * Medal (watercolors) | Une Averse–rue Bonaparte; Cab Station–Rue Bonaparte | | Oil on canvas | 1887 | | Terra Foundation for American Art, on long-term loan to Art Institute of Chicago | |
| Childe Hassam * Medal (oils) * Medal (watercolors) | Snowy Day on Fifth Avenue | | Oil on canvas | c.1892 | | Carnegie Museum of Art, Pittsburgh, Pennsylvania | |
| Childe Hassam * Medal (oils) * Medal (watercolors) | Midsummer Morning | | Oil on canvas | | | | |
| Childe Hassam * Medal (oils) * Medal (watercolors) | Autumn in Paris | | Oil on canvas | c.1888-89 | | | |
| Childe Hassam * Medal (oils) * Medal (watercolors) | Indian Summer, Madison Square | | Oil on canvas | 1892 | | | |
| Childe Hassam * Medal (oils) * Medal (watercolors) | View in Montmartre | | Watercolor | 1889 | | Princeton University Art Museum | |
| Childe Hassam * Medal (oils) * Medal (watercolors) | Springtime in the City | | Watercolor | | | | |
| Childe Hassam * Medal (oils) * Medal (watercolors) | Fifth Avenue | | Watercolor | | | | |
| Joseph Henry Hatfield | The Doll's Bath | | Oil on canvas | ca.1891 | | | |
| Joseph Henry Hatfield | A Letter From Papa | | Oil on canvas | ca.1891 | | | |
| Charles Henry Hayden | A Quiet Morning, October | | Oil on canvas | 1891 | | | |
| Charles Henry Hayden | Cattle and Landscape | | Oil on canvas | 1890 | | | |
| George Peter Alexander Healy | Portrait of Adolphe Thiers | | Oil on canvas | 1874 | | Chicago Historical Society, Chicago, Illinois | In this photo of Healy's studio, his portrait of Thiers is shown at upper left. |
| Edward Lamson Henry | The County Fair | | Oil on canvas | 1891 | | | |
| Edward Lamson Henry | The Wedding Day (A Virginia Wedding) | | Oil on canvas | 1890 | | | |
| Edward Lamson Henry | Before the Days of Rapid Transit | | Watercolor | | | Albany Institute of History & Art, Albany, New York | |
| Albert Herter | Portrait of Mrs. H. (Adele Herter) | | Oil on canvas | | | | |
| Albert Herter | The Great Mystery | | Watercolor | | | | |
| George W. Hitchcock * Medal (oils) | Tulip Culture | | Oil on canvas | 1889 | | M. H. de Young Memorial Museum, San Francisco, California | |
| George W. Hitchcock * Medal (oils) | The Scarecrow | | Oil on canvas | | | Private collection | Hitchcock reworked the painting, and renamed it The Poppy Field. |
| Frank Holman | Venice; Young Warrior | | Oil on canvas | | | | |
| Frank Holman | Melody | | Watercolor | | | | |
| Frank Holman | A Sun Effect | | Watercolor | | | | |
| Lucy D. Holme | A Holiday Occupation | | Oil on canvas | ca.1892-93 | | Salem County Historical Society, Salem, New Jersey | |
| Winslow Homer * Medal (oils) | Lost on the Grand Banks | | Oil on canvas | 1885 | | Collection of Bill Gates | |
| Winslow Homer * Medal (oils) | The Fog Warning | | Oil on canvas | 1885 | | Museum of Fine Arts Boston | |
| Winslow Homer * Medal (oils) | Eight Bells | | Oil on canvas | 1886 | | Addison Gallery of American Art, Phillips Academy, Andover, Massachusetts | |
| Winslow Homer * Medal (oils) | Camp Fire | | Oil on canvas | 1880 | | Metropolitan Museum of Art | |
| Winslow Homer * Medal (oils) | Sunlight on the Coast | | Oil on canvas | 1890 | | Toledo Museum of Art | |
| Winslow Homer * Medal (oils) | Coast in Winter | | Oil on canvas | 1892 | | Worcester Art Museum, Worcester, Massachusetts | |
| Winslow Homer * Medal (oils) | Sailors Take Warning (Sunset) | | Oil on canvas | 1881; 1907 | | Freer Gallery of Art, Washington, D.C. | Homer reworked the painting in 1907, and renamed it Early Evening. |
| Winslow Homer * Medal (oils) | Dressing for the Carnival | | Oil on canvas | 1877 | | Metropolitan Museum of Art | |
| Winslow Homer * Medal (oils) | Hound and Hunter | | Oil on canvas | 1892 | | National Gallery of Art | |
| Winslow Homer * Medal (oils) | The Herring Net (Herring Fishing) | | Oil on canvas | 1885 | | Art Institute of Chicago | |
| Winslow Homer * Medal (oils) | Winter Coast | | Oil on canvas | 1890 | | Philadelphia Museum of Art | |
| Winslow Homer * Medal (oils) | The Two Guides | | Oil on canvas | 1877 | | Clark Art Institute, Williamstown, Massachusetts | |
| Winslow Homer * Medal (oils) | The Gale | | Oil on canvas | 1881 ca.1893 | | Worcester Art Museum, Worcester, Massachusetts | Homer reworked the painting for the 1893 World's Fair. |
| Winslow Homer * Medal (oils) | March Wind (West Wind) | | Oil on canvas | 1891 | | Addison Gallery of American Art, Phillips Academy, Andover, Massachusetts | |
| Thomas Hovenden | Breaking Home Ties | | Oil on canvas | 1890 | | Philadelphia Museum of Art | |
| Thomas Hovenden | Bringing Home the Bride | | Oil on canvas | 1893 | | University of St. Thomas, Saint Paul, Minnesota | |
| Thomas Hovenden | When Hope Was Darkest | | Oil on canvas | 1892 | | | |
| William Henry Howe * Medal (oils) | A Norman Bull | | Oil on canvas | 1891 ca.1901 | | Smithsonian American Art Museum | Howe reworked the painting, ca.1901, and renamed it Monarch of the Farm. |
| William Henry Howe * Medal (oils) | Return of the Herd at Evening, Uplands of Normandy | | Oil on canvas | 1887 | | | Howe, in his studio, with Return of the Herd: |
| William Henry Howe * Medal (oils) | Early Start to Market, Holland | | Oil on canvas | ca.1888 | | | Ex collection: Grand Rapids Art Association; Stolen 1922, never recovered |
| William Henry Howe * Medal (oils) | Morning Karton Hof Meadows, Holland | | Oil on canvas | ca.1892 | | | |
| Alfred Cornelius Howland | Fourth of July Parade in Walpole, New Hampshire | | Oil on canvas | ca.1886 | | High Museum of Art, Atlanta, Georgia | |
| Daniel Huntington | The Goldsmith's Daughter | | Oil on canvas | 1883 | | Private collection, Richmond, Virginia | |
| Daniel Huntington | Elise (Mrs. Lindsey Tappin) | | Oil on canvas | ca.1891 | | Private collection | |
| Daniel Huntington | Portrait of Hon. Seth Low | | Oil on canvas | 1891 | | Columbia University, Manhattan, NYC | |
| Daniel Huntington | Portrait of Elliott F. Shepard, Jr. | | Oil on canvas | ca.1891-92 | | Chamber of Congress of the State of New York | |
| George Inness * Medal (oils) | Winter Morning—Montclair | | Oil on canvas | 1882 | | Montclair Museum of Art, Montclair, New Jersey | |
| George Inness * Medal (oils) | A Gray Lowery Day | | Oil on canvas | 1877 | | Davis Museum, Wellesley College, Wellesley, Massachusetts | |
| George Inness * Medal (oils) | Threatening | | Oil on canvas | 1891 | | Art Institute of Chicago | |
| George Inness * Medal (oils) | Nine O'Clock | | Oil on canvas | 1891 | | | |
| George Inness * Medal (oils) | Sundown in the Lane | | Oil on canvas | 1892 | | Montclair Museum of Art, Montclair, New Jersey | |
| George Inness * Medal (oils) | Autumn Near Marshfield | | Oil on canvas | 1876 | | | |
| George Inness * Medal (oils) | White Mountain Valley | | Oil on canvas | ca.1875-78 | | | |
| George Inness * Medal (oils) | The Delaware Valley | | Oil on canvas | ca.1863 | | Metropolitan Museum of Art | |
| George Inness * Medal (oils) | Sunburst | | Oil on canvas | 1878 | | Niagara University, Niagara, New York | |
| George Inness * Medal (oils) | The Mill Pond | | Oil on canvas | 1889 | | Art Institute of Chicago | |
| George Inness * Medal (oils) | September Afternoon | | Oil on canvas | 1877 | | Smithsonian American Art Museum | |
| George Inness * Medal (oils) | Twilight | | Oil on canvas | 1860 | | Williams College Museum of Art, Williamstown, Massachusetts | |
| George Inness * Medal (oils) | A Day in June | | Oil on canvas | 1882 | | Brooklyn Museum | |
| George Inness * Medal (oils) | End of the Shower | | Oil on canvas | 1891 | | University of Arizona Museum of Art, Tucson | |
| George Inness * Medal (oils) | Sunny Autumn Day | | Oil on canvas | 1892 | | Cleveland Museum of Art | |
| Benoni Irwin | Sweet Sixteen | | Oil on canvas | 1893 | | | |
| Benoni Irwin | Portrait of Herbert Herkomer | | Oil on canvas | 1888 | | | |
| Frederick James | An Impromptu Affair in the Days of the Code | | Oil on canvas | c.1890 | | Museum of Fine Arts, Springfield, Massachusetts | |
| Henrietta Lewis Jamison | The Lanterns | | Oil on canvas | | | Columbus Museum of Art, Columbus, Ohio | |
| Eastman Johnson * Medal (oils) | The Cranberry Harvest, Nantucket Island | | Oil on canvas | 1880 | | Timken Museum of Art, San Diego, California | |
| Eastman Johnson * Medal (oils) | Portrait of Dr. McCosh | | Oil on canvas | 1883 | | Princeton University | |
| Eastman Johnson * Medal (oils) | The Nantucket School of Philosophy | | Oil on panel | 1887 | | Walters Art Museum, Baltimore, Maryland | |
| Eastman Johnson * Medal (oils) | Portrait of a Girl (Florence Einstein) | | Oil on canvas | 1883 | | Private collection | Possibly: Young Girl ? |
| Eastman Johnson * Medal (oils) | The Funding Bill—Portrait of Two Men | | Oil on canvas | 1881 | | Metropolitan Museum of Art | |
| Eastman Johnson * Medal (oils) | My Portrait | | Oil on canvas | 1891 | | Hirshhorn Museum and Sculpture Garden, Washington, D.C. | Self-portrait, full-length, standing |
| Eastman Johnson * Medal (oils) | Portrait of Colonel Archibald Rogers | | Oil on canvas | 1892 | | Anne C. Stranding Museum of the Horse, Ruidoso, New Mexico | |
| Humphreys Johnston | Study in a Granada Garden | | Oil on canvas | | | | |
| Humphreys Johnston | Study of Breton Peasants (Late Afternoon); Moorish Fountain in the Church of Santa Maria | | Oil on canvas | | | | |
| Francis Coates Jones | On the White Sand Dunes | | Oil on canvas | 1885 | | | |
| Francis Coates Jones | Exchanging Confidences | | Oil on canvas | ca.1885 | | | |
| Francis Coates Jones | The Favorite Grandchild | | Oil on canvas | ca.1888 | | | |
| Francis Coates Jones | Waiting | | Watercolor? | ca.1888 | | National Academy of Design, Manhattan, NYC | |
| Hugh Bolton Jones * Medal (oils) | Spring | | Oil on canvas | 1886 | | Metropolitan Museum of Art | |
| Hugh Bolton Jones * Medal (oils) | The Flax Breaker | | Oil on canvas | | | | |
| Hugh Bolton Jones * Medal (oils) | Winter; Early Snow; Winter | | Watercolors | | | | |
| Alfred Kappes * Medal (oils) | Rent Day | | Oil on canvas | 1885 | | | |
| Alfred Kappes * Medal (oils) | Tattered and Torn | | Oil on canvas | 1886 | | Smith College Museum of Art, Northampton, Massachusetts | Ex collection: Boston Art Club |
| Alfred Kappes * Medal (oils) | Apple Pie | | Watercolor | | | | |
| Dora Wheeler Keith * Medal (murals) | Portrait of Lawrence Hutton | | Oil on canvas | 1892 | | Princeton University | |
| Dora Wheeler Keith * Medal (murals) | Woman's Building (Library): ceiling mural | | Mural | 1892-93 | | | Library: |
| Dora Wheeler Keith * Medal (murals) | Woman's Building (Rotunda): Daphne's Nymphs | | Oil on canvas | | | | |
| Alice DeWolf Kellogg | The Mother | | Oil on canvas | 1889 | | Jane Addams Hull House Museum, Chicago, Illinois | |
| Alice DeWolf Kellogg | Intermezzo | | Oil on canvas | ca.1892 | | | |
| Alice DeWolf Kellogg | Woman's Building (Reception Room): Instruction | | Mural | | | | |
| William Sargeant Kendall * Medal (oils) | The Glory of Fair Promise | | Oil on canvas | 1892 | | | |
| William Sargeant Kendall * Medal (oils) | Saint Yves, Pray for Us | | Oil on canvas | 1890 | | | |
| Anna Elizabeth Klumpke | Woman's Building (Rotunda): Portrait of Miss M. D. | | Oil on canvas | | | | |
| Daniel Ridgway Knight * Medal (oils) | Hailing the Ferry | | Oil on canvas | 1891 | | Pennsylvania Academy of the Fine Arts | |
| Robert Koehler | The Strike | | Oil on canvas | 1886 | | Deutsches Historisches Museum, Berlin, Germany | |
| Robert Koehler | The Carpenter's Family | | Oil on canvas | | | Private collection, Woodland Hills, California | |
| Robert Koehler | At the Cafe | | Oil on canvas | 1887 | | Private collection | |
| Augustus B. Koopman | Asking a Blessing | | Oil on canvas | ca.1892 | | | |
| Augustus B. Koopman | The Orphan; Dreaming of One Afar | | Oil on canvas | | | | |
| Louis Kronberg | Behind the Footlights | | Oil on canvas | 1892 | | Pennsylvania Academy of the Fine Arts | |
| John La Farge | The Three Wise Men | | Oil on canvas | 1878 | | Museum of Fine Arts, Boston | |
| John La Farge | Visit of Nicodemus to Christ | | Oil on canvas | 1880 | | Smithsonian American Art Museum | |
| John La Farge | Study of a Boy's Head (Garth Wilkinson James) | | Oil on canvas | 1860-62 | | Denver Art Museum, Denver, Colorado | |
| John La Farge | Venetian Guitar Player | | Oil on canvas | 1887 | | Worcester Art Museum, Worcester, Massachusetts | |
| Emma E. Lampert * Medal (watercolors) | A Hillside in Picardy | | Oil on canvas | ca.1887 | | | |
| Emma E. Lampert * Medal (watercolors) | Behind the Dunes | | Oil on canvas | | | | |
| Emma E. Lampert * Medal (watercolors) | A Breadwinner | | Watercolor | 1891 | | Memorial Art Gallery, University of Rochester, Rochester, New York | |
| Emma E. Lampert * Medal (watercolors) | Through the Meadows in Holland | | Watercolor | | | | |
| Clara Welles Lathrop | At the Flower Market | | Oil on canvas | 1891 | | Smith College Museum of Art, Northampton, Massachusetts | |
| William Robinson Leigh | The End of the Play (The Gambler) | | Oil on canvas | 1892 | | Private collection | |
| William Robinson Leigh | A New Acquaintance | | Oil on canvas | | | | |
| Chester Hicks Loomis | Memoria | | Oil on canvas | | | | |
| Chester Hicks Loomis | Hester | | Oil on canvas | ca.1892 | | | |
| Francis William Loring | Great Bridge at Chioggia | | Oil on canvas | 1886-87 | | Museum of Fine Arts, Boston | |
| Will Hicock Low | Love Disarmed | | Oil on panel | c.1889 | | Brooklyn Museum | |
| Will Hicock Low | A Woodland Glade | | Oil on canvas | 1891 | | | |
| Will Hicock Low | May Blossoms | | Oil on canvas | | | | Ex collection: Smith College Museum of Art |
| Will Hicock Low | In an Old Garden; A Portrait (Evans) | | | | | | |
| Anna Lownes | The Raven | | Oil on canvas | | | | |
| Anna Lownes | Woman's Building (Board Room): Still Life—Study of Apples | | Oil on canvas | ca.1884-89 | | | |
| Fernand Lungren | A Snowy Evening | | Watercolor? | | | | |
| Clara Taggart MacChesney * Medal (watercolors) | Still Life | | Watercolor | | | | |
| Clara Taggart MacChesney * Medal (watercolors) | The Old Cobbler | | Watercolor | | | | |
| Elizabeth Macdowell (Kenton) | Day Dreams—Portrait of Caroline Eakins | | Oil on canvas | | | Taubman Museum of Art, Roanoke, Virginia | |
| Walter MacEwen | A Ghost Story | | Oil on canvas | 1887 | | Cleveland Museum of Art | |
| Walter MacEwen | Salem Witches | | Oil on canvas | ca.1892 | | Private collection | |
| Walter MacEwen | The Absent One on All Souls' Day | | Oil on canvas | 1889 | | Museum of Modern Art, Liege, Belgium | |
| Walter MacEwen | The Judgment of Paris | | Oil on canvas | 1886 | | Tennessee Wesleyan College, Athens, Tennessee | |
| Walter MacEwen | Manufactures and Liberal Arts Building: Music; Life; Textiles; The Chase | Music Life | Murals | | | | |
| Mary Fairchild MacMonnies (Low) * Medal (oils) | June Morning | | Oil on canvas | 1888 | | | Ex collection: St. Louis Museum of Art |
| Mary Fairchild MacMonnies (Low) * Medal (oils) | Tea al Fresco (Five O'clock Tea) | | Oil on canvas | 1891 | | Swope Art Museum, Terre Haute, Indiana, | |
| Mary Fairchild MacMonnies (Low) * Medal (oils) | Woman's Building: Primitive Woman | | Mural | 1893 | | | The 3-part mural was 14 ft (4.3 m) tall and 58 ft (17.7 m) long. |
| Ernest Lee Major | Youth | | Oil on canvas | ca.1890 | | | |
| Ernest Lee Major | Portrait (Amos Edward Lawrence) | | Oil on canvas | 1892 | | Yale University Art Gallery | |
| Ernest Lee Major | Saint Genevieve; Portrait (Clark) | | Oil on canvas | | | | |
| Carl Marr | Summer Afternoon (on the Terrace) | | Oil on canvas | 1892 | | University Art Museum, University of California—Berkeley | |
| Carl Marr | The Flagellants | | Oil on canvas | 1889 | | City of Milwaukee, on loan to Museum of Wisconsin Art, West Bend, Wisconsin | |
| Homer Dodge Martin | Mussel Gatherers at Villerville, Normandy | | Oil on canvas | 1886 | | National Gallery of Art | Ex collection: Corcoran Gallery of Art |
| Homer Dodge Martin | Behind the Dunes, Lake Ontario | | Oil on canvas | 1887 | | Metropolitan Museum of Art | |
| Homer Dodge Martin | Old Manor at Cricqueboef | | Oil on canvas | ca.1886-92 | | Metropolitan Museum of Art | |
| Homer Dodge Martin | Head Waters of the Hudson | | Oil on canvas | 1869 | | | Ex collection: St. Louis Art Museum |
| George W. Maynard | Portrait of Frank Davis Millet (as a War Correspondent) | | Oil on canvas | 1878 | | National Portrait Gallery, Washington, D.C. | |
| George W. Maynard | In Strange Seas | | Oil on canvas | 1889 | | Metropolitan Museum of Art | |
| George W. Maynard | Civilization | | Oil on canvas | ca.1888 | | National Academy of Design, Manhattan, NYC | |
| George W. Maynard | Pomona | | Oil on canvas | | | | |
| George W. Maynard | Flora | | Oil on canvas | ca.1892 | | | |
| George W. Maynard | A Sea Witch; Sirens | | Watercolor | | | | |
| Charles Morgan McIlhenny * Medal (oils) * Medal (watercolors) | On the Beach | | Oil on canvas | | | | |
| Charles Morgan McIlhenny * Medal (oils) * Medal (watercolors) | Bull Calf | | Watercolor | | | | |
| Charles Morgan McIlhenny * Medal (oils) * Medal (watercolors) | Old Friends | | Watercolor | | | | |
| Charles Morgan McIlhenny * Medal (oils) * Medal (watercolors) | Moonrise | | Watercolor | | | | |
| Gari Melchers | The Pilots | | Oil on canvas | 1887 | | Frye Art Museum, Seattle, Washington | |
| Gari Melchers | The Skaters | | Oil on canvas | ca.1892 | | Pennsylvania Academy of the Fine Arts | |
| Gari Melchers | Married | | Oil on canvas | ca.1892 | | Albright-Knox Art Gallery, Buffalo, New York | |
| Gari Melchers | The Sermon | | Oil on canvas | 1886 | | Smithsonian American Art Museum | |
| Gari Melchers | The Nativity | | Oil on canvas | ca.1891 | | "Belmont" (Gari Melchers Home), Falmouth, Virginia | |
| Gari Melchers | The Communion | | Oil on canvas | ca.1888 | | Johnson Museum of Art, Cornell University, Ithaca, New York | |
| Gari Melchers | The Embroideress - Portrait of Mrs. H. (Mrs. George Hitchcock) | | Oil on canvas | ca.1889 | | Crystal Bridges Museum of American Art; Bentonville, Arkansas | Auctioned at Sotheby's, New York, December 1, 2004, Lot 1. |
| Gari Melchers | Manufactures and Liberal Arts Building: The Arts of War; The Arts of Peace | | Murals | 1893 | | University of Michigan—Ann Arbor | |
| Anna Lea Merritt | Love Locked Out | | Oil on canvas | 1884 | | Tate Britain, London | |
| Anna Lea Merritt | Portrait of Mrs. Reginald De Koven | | Oil on canvas | | | Private collection, Philadelphia | |
| Anna Lea Merritt | Eve Overcome with Remorse | | Oil on canvas | 1885 | | Private collection | Exhibited in the Great Britiain section of the Palace of Fine Arts. |
| Willard Leroy Metcalf | Tunisian Market (A Tunisian Pottery Shop) | | Oil on canvas | ca.1888 | | | Ex collection: St. Botolph Club, Boston |
| Willard Leroy Metcalf | Road to the Village, Normandy | | Oil on canvas | ca.1890 | | National Gallery of Art | |
| Willard Leroy Metcalf | Summer Twilight | | Oil on canvas | 1890 | | Private collection, Atlanta, Georgia | |
| Francis Davis Millet | The Window Seat | | Oil on canvas | 1883 | | Private collection, Grosse Pointe, Michigan | |
| Francis Davis Millet | At the Inn | | Oil on canvas | 1884 | | Union League Club | |
| Francis Davis Millet | A Difficult Duet | | Oil on canvas | 1886 | | Private collection | |
| Francis Davis Millet | Woman Lacing a Sandal | | Oil on panel | | | Private collection, Newton, Massachusetts | |
| Francis Davis Millet | Old Harmonies | | Oil on canvas | ca.1884 | | Private collection, New Canaan, Connecticut | |
| Francis Davis Millet | Anthony Van Corlaer, the Trumpeter | | Oil on canvas | ca.1889 | | Duquesnes Club, Pittsburgh, Pennsylvania | |
| Francis Davis Millet | Rook and Pigeon | | Oil on canvas | 1889 | | Private collection | |
| Francis Davis Millet | Sweet Melodies | | | | | | |
| Francis Davis Millet | Roman Maiden | | Watercolor | | | | |
| Francis Davis Millet | New York State Building (Banquet Hall): The Triumph of Juno | | Mural | 1892 | | | |
| Robert Crannell Minor | Autumn | | Oil on canvas | | | | |
| Robert Crannell Minor | Evening | | Oil on canvas | | | | |
| Robert Crannell Minor | Close of Day | | Oil on canvas | ca.1886 | | | |
| Robert Crannell Minor | Moonlight | | Watercolor | | | | |
| Louis Moeller | Stubborn | | Oil on canvas | ca.1887 | | Private collection | |
| Louis Moeller | Searching (Inspection) | | Oil on canvas | | | | |
| Harry Humphrey Moore | Japanese Musicians | | Oil on canvas | ca.1891 | | | |
| Edward Moran | The White Squadron's Farewell Salute to the Body of John Ericsson | | Oil on canvas | 1891 | | United States Naval Academy Museum, Annapolis, Maryland | |
| Edward Moran | The First Ship Entering New York Harbor | | Oil on canvas | 1892 | | Berkshire Museum, Pittsfield, Massachusetts | |
| Edward Moran | Life Saving Patrol, New Jersey Coast | | Oil on canvas | ca.1892-93 | | Smithsonian American Art Museum | |
| Edward Moran | Melodies of the Sea | | Oil on canvas | ca.1890 | | | |
| Peter Moran | Down the Arroya to Santa Fe | | Oil on canvas | 1893 | | Private collection, Rosemont, Pennsylvania | |
| Thomas Moran | Grand Canyon of the Yellowstone | | Oil on canvas | 1873-74 | | U.S. Department of the Interior, on loan to Smithsonian American Art Museum | |
| Thomas Moran | Icebergs in Mid-Atlantic (Spectres from the North) | | Oil on canvas | 1890 | | Gilcrease Museum, Tulsa, Oklahoma | |
| Henry Siddons Mowbray * Medal (oils) | Rose Harvest | | Oil on canvas | 1887 | | Mint Museum, Charlotte, North Carolina | |
| Henry Siddons Mowbray * Medal (oils) | Arcadia | | Oil on canvas | ca.1890 | | Private collection | |
| Henry Siddons Mowbray * Medal (oils) | Scheherazade | | Oil on canvas | 1886 | | | |
| Henry Siddons Mowbray * Medal (oils) | The Evening Breeze | | Oil on canvas | 1887 | | Private collection | |
| Albert H. Munsell | Danger Ahead | | Oil on canvas | 1887 | | | |
| John Francis Murphy * Medal (oils) | November Grays | | Oil on canvas | | | | |
| John Francis Murphy * Medal (oils) | The Hazy Morn | | Oil on canvas | | | | |
| Victor Nehlig | Pocahontas Saving the Life of Captain John Smith | | Oil on canvas | 1870 | | Brigham Young University Museum of Art, Provo, Utah | |
| Walter Nettleton | December Sunshine | | Oil on canvas | 1891 | | Yale University Art Gallery | |
| Walter Nettleton | Watching for the Return of the Fishing Fleet | | Oil on canvas | 1891 | | Private collection, Claremont, California | |
| Walter Nettleton | A Dark Interior | | Oil on canvas | 1888 | | Private collection | |
| Walter Nettleton | Approach of Harvest Time | | Oil on canvas | 1892 | | | |
| Walter Nettleton | Teasel Gatherer | | Oil on canvas | 1892 | | | |
| Walter Nettleton | Left in Charge of the Farmyard | | Oil on canvas | 1890 | | | |
| Rhoda Holmes Nicholls * Medal (watercolors) | The Scarlet Letter | | Watercolor | ca.1887 | | | |
| Rhoda Holmes Nicholls * Medal (watercolors) | Chrysanthemums; Washing Day | | Watercolor | | | | |
| Rhoda Holmes Nicholls * Medal (watercolors) | Woman's Building (Rotunda): A Venetian Courtyard | | Oil on canvas | | | | |
| Rhoda Holmes Nicholls * Medal (watercolors) | Woman's Building (Connecticut Room): On the Dunes | | Watercolor | | | | |
| James Craig Nicoll | Sunlight on the Sea | | Oil on canvas | 1883 | | | Ex collection: Williams College |
| James Craig Nicoll | Will It Rain Tomorrow? | | Oil on canvas | ca.1892 | | | |
| James Craig Nicoll | Twilight, Late Autumn | | Watercolor | | | | |
| James Craig Nicoll | Evening After a Gale; During a Storm; Near York Harbor, Maine | | Watercolors | | | | |
| Eleanor Norcross | In My Studio | | Oil on canvas | 1891 | | Fitchburg Art Museum, Fitchburg, Massachusetts | |
| William Edward Norton | A Moment's Rest | | Oil on canvas | 1892 | | Smithsonian American Art Museum | |
| William Edward Norton | Return of the Herring Fleet, Holland | | Oil on canvas | | | | |
| William Edward Norton | Mid Channel | | Oil on canvas | | | New York Medical College, Valhalla, New York | |
| William Edward Norton | Off the Dutch Coast; Moonlight on the River | | Oil on canvas | | | | |
| Elizabeth Nourse | Good Friday, Rome (Vendredi Saint) | | Oil on canvas | 1891 | | Union League Club of Chicago | |
| Elizabeth Nourse | The Family Meal (Le Repas en Famille ) | | Oil on canvas | 1891 | | Private collection | |
| Elizabeth Nourse | The Reader | | Oil on canvas | ca.1892 | | Private collection, Cincinnati, Ohio | |
| Elizabeth Nourse | Woman's Building (Cincinnati Room): The Pardon of St. Francis of Assisi | | Oil on canvas | 1890 | | | |
| Elizabeth Nourse | Woman's Building (Cincinnati Room): The Peasant Women of Borst | | Oil on canvas | 1891 | | Cincinnati Art Museum | |
| Leonard Ochtman * Medal (oils) | Along the Mianus River | | Oil on canvas | 1892 | | Flint Institute of Arts, Flint, Michigan | |
| Leonard Ochtman * Medal (oils) | Harvesting by Moonlight | | Oil on canvas | ca.1891 | | | |
| Leonard Ochtman * Medal (oils) | Night | | Oil on canvas | 1893 | | | |
| Leonard Ochtman * Medal (oils) | Frost | | Watercolor | | | | |
| Walter Launt Palmer * Medal (oils) | Autumn Morning - Mist Clearing Away | | Oil on canvas | 1892 | | Albany Institute of History and Art, Albany, New York | |
| Walter Launt Palmer * Medal (oils) | An Early Snow | | Oil on canvas | 1887 | | Private collection | |
| Walter Launt Palmer * Medal (oils) | January | | Oil on canvas | 1887 | | | |
| Frederic (Eric) Pape | Site of Ancient Memphis | | Oil on canvas | 1891 | | | |
| Stephen Parrish | Winter Sunset, Cape Cod | | Oil on canvas | 1892 | | | |
| Stephen Parrish | Evening | | Oil on canvas | 1892 | | | |
| Stephen Parrish | Winter in New Hampshire | | Oil on canvas | 1891 | | | |
| Stephen Parrish | A Mountain Road; An Orchard | | Oil on canvas | | | | |
| Orrin Sheldon Parsons | Lawn Tennis Party | | Oil on canvas | 1891 | | | |
| Orrin Sheldon Parsons | Lady in Black | | Oil on canvas | | | | |
| Arthur Parton | In the Month of May | | Oil on canvas | ca.1893 | | Private collection | |
| Arthur Parton | Evening After the Rain | | Oil on canvas | ca.1887 | | | |
| William McGregor Paxton | An Idyl | | Oil on canvas | | | | Probably destroyed in a 1904 fire |
| Charles Sprague Pearce | A Village Funeral in Brittany | | Oil on canvas | 1891 | | Danforth Museum, Framingham, Massachusetts | |
| Charles Sprague Pearce | Mother and Child | | Oil on canvas | ca.1880 | | Private collection, Ellicottville, New York | |
| Charles Sprague Pearce | The Shepherdess | | Oil on canvas | 1888 | | | |
| Charles Sprague Pearce | Portrait of Mrs. P. (the Artist's Wife) | | Oil on canvas | 1889 | | | |
| Charles Sprague Pearce | Portrait of Mrs. P. (the Artist's Wife) | | Oil on canvas | | | | |
| Charles Sprague Pearce | The Annunciation | | Oil on canvas | ca.1892 | | | |
| Orrin Peck * Medal (oils) | Love's Token | | Oil on canvas | ca.1892 | | Phoebe A. Hearst Museum, Berkeley, California | At center, bottom, in photograph. |
| Frank C. Penfold | The Herring Season, Pas de Calais | | Oil on canvas | | | | |
| Lilla Cabot Perry | Child with Violincello (A Young Violincellist) | | Oil on canvas | 1892 | | Museum of Fine Arts Boston | |
| Lilla Cabot Perry | Open Air Concert | | Oil on canvas | 1890 | | Museum of Fine Arts, Boston | |
| Lilla Cabot Perry | Child in a Window (At the Library Window) | | Oil on canvas | 1891 | | Private collection | |
| Lilla Cabot Perry | La Petite Angèle (Alice Perry) | | Oil on canvas | 1889 | | Private collection | |
| Lilla Cabot Perry | Reflection | | Oil on canvas | ca.1890 | | Private collection | |
| Lilla Cabot Perry | The Beginner: Portrait of Alice | | Oil on canvas | 1891 | | University of Arizona Museum of Art, Tucson | |
| Lilla Cabot Perry | Portrait of a Child (Cornelia Wolcott?) | | Oil on canvas | | | | |
| Helen Watson Phelps | Abandon | | Oil on canvas | | | Rhode Island School of Design, Providence, Rhode Island | |
| William Lamb Picknell * Medal (oils) | Road to Concarneau | | Oil on canvas | 1880 | | National Gallery of Art | Ex collection: Corcoran Gallery of Art |
| William Lamb Picknell * Medal (oils) | Sunday Morning in New England | | Oil on canvas | | | | |
| William Lamb Picknell * Medal (oils) | Early Morning | | Oil on canvas | | | | |
| William Lamb Picknell * Medal (oils) | The Edge of Winter | | Oil on canvas | ca.1891 | | | |
| Charles Adams Platt * Medal (oils) | Winter Landscape | | Oil on canvas | | | Addison Gallery of American Art, Phillips Academy, Andover, Massachusetts | |
| Charles Adams Platt * Medal (oils) | Early Spring | | Oil on canvas | | | Worcester Art Museum, Worcester, Massachusetts | |
| Henry Rankin Poore | The Bridge—Close of a City Day | | Oil on canvas | ca.1886 | | | |
| Henry Rankin Poore | The Night of the Nativity (Note: "A PRIZE PHILADELPHIAN. Only one prize was offered this year by the Prize Fund Exhibition at the American Art Galleries, consisting of $2,500. It has been awarded to H. R. Poore of Philadelphia for his large nocturne, 'The Night of the Nativity'."—The New York Times, May 12, 1889.) | | Oil on canvas | ca.1889 | | | Ex collection: Buffalo Academy of Fine Arts |
| John Willard Raught | The Highway, Brittany | | Oil on canvas | 1889 | | Private collection | |
| John Willard Raught | Gorse Cutters, Brittany | | Oil on canvas | ca.1892 | | Private collection | |
| Frank Knox Morton Rehn | Where Waves and Sunshine Meet | | Oil on canvas | | | | |
| Frank Knox Morton Rehn | Close of a Summer Day | | Oil on canvas | 1886 | | | Ex collection: Albright-Knox Art Gallery |
| Frank Knox Morton Rehn | The Reef | | Watercolor | | | | |
| Robert Lewis Reid * Medal (oils) | Her First Born | | Oil on canvas | 1888 | | Brooklyn Museum | |
| Robert Lewis Reid * Medal (oils) | The Red Flower (Portrait of Miss H.) | | Oil on canvas | 1890 | | Private collection | exterior, full-length, a young girl in a white dress holding a flower |
| Robert Lewis Reid * Medal (oils) | Portrait of Little Miss S. (Stevens) | | Oil on canvas | | | | |
| Robert Lewis Reid * Medal (oils) | Vision of St. Angela d'Angant | | Oil on canvas | 1890 | | | |
| Robert Lewis Reid * Medal (oils) | Manufactures and Liberal Arts Building: Iron Working; Textile Art; Design | | Murals | | | | Destroyed in the July 1894 fire |
| Charles Stanley Reinhart | Awaiting the Absent | | Oil on canvas | 1888 | | | Ex collection: Carnegie Museum of Art |
| Charles Stanley Reinhart | Washed Ashore | | Oil on canvas | 1887 | | National Gallery of Art | Vincent van Gogh was an admirer of the painting. (Note: "In Harper's Weekly I found an illustration by Reinhart, by far the best I've seen by him up to now, Washed Ashore. A body has been washed up, a man is kneeling beside it to see who it is, a few fishermen and women give information about the shipwreck victim to a gendarme. So it looks somewhat like Victim of a Shipwreck that you have, but the drawing by R. has something of [Félix] Régamey, for example. It's a very fine print." — Vincent van Gogh.); Ex collection: Corcoran Gallery of Art |
| Charles Stanley Reinhart | Manufactures and Liberal Arts Building (ceiling mural): Sculpture/Decoration/Embroidery/Design | | Mural | | | | Destroyed in the July 1894 fire |
| Samuel Richards | Blissful Hours | | Oil on canvas | 1885 | | Dayton Art Institute, Dayton, Ohio | |
| Samuel Richards | The Hour of Prayer | | Oil on canvas | 1887 | | Private collection | On loan to Metropolitan Museum of Art, c.1910 to 1934. |
| William Trost Richards | Old Ocean's Gray and Melancholy Waste | | Oil on canvas | 1885 | | Pennsylvania Academy of the Fine Arts | |
| William Trost Richards | February | | Oil on canvas | 1887 | | Pennsylvania Academy of the Fine Arts | |
| William Trost Richards | An Atlantic Beach | | Watercolor | | | | Possibly: Atlantic City—Beach, Dunes and Grass ? |
| Francis Henry Richardson | Breton Widow at Prayer | | Oil on canvas | ca.1890 | | | |
| Lucy Lee Robbins (van Rinkhuyzen) | Before the Looking Glass | | Oil on canvas | 1892 | | | |
| Lucy Lee Robbins (van Rinkhuyzen) | My Portrait; My Mother's Portrait | | Oil on canvas | | | | |
| Theodore Robinson * Medal (oils) | The Layette | | Oil on canvas | 1892 | | National Gallery of Art | Ex collection: Corcoran Gallery of Art |
| Theodore Robinson * Medal (oils) | Winter Landscape | | Oil on canvas | 1889 | | Art Institute of Chicago | |
| Theodore Robinson * Medal (oils) | Roman Fountain | | Oil on canvas | ca.1891 | | Long Collection of American Art | |
| Julius Rolshoven | Hall in the Doge's Palace, Venice | | Oil on canvas | 1888 | | | Possibly in a British collection |
| Julius Rolshoven | Sotto Marina, Near Venice | | Oil on canvas | 1891 | | | |
| Julius Rolshoven | A Spanish Dancer | | Oil on canvas | | | | |
| Edward Francis Rook | Moonrise, Normandy | | Oil on canvas | | | | |
| Guy Rose | The Potato Gatherers | | Oil on canvas | 1891 | | Private collection, San Francisco | |
| Guy Rose | The End of the Day | | Oil on canvas | 1891 | | | Destroyed in a 1991 fire |
| Guy Rose | Food for the Laborers | | Oil on canvas | ca.1890 | | Private collection | |
| John Singer Sargent * Medal (oils) | Mother and Child - Mrs. Edward L. Davis and Her; Son Livingston | | Oil on canvas | 1890 | | Los Angeles County Museum of Art | |
| John Singer Sargent * Medal (oils) | Ellen Terry as Lady Macbeth | | Oil on canvas | 1889 | | Tate Britain, London | |
| John Singer Sargent * Medal (oils) | Portrait of Katharine Chase Pratt | | Oil on canvas | 1890 | | Worcester Art Museum, Worcester, Massachusetts | |
| John Singer Sargent * Medal (oils) | Portrait of Mrs. Charles Inches | | Oil on canvas | 1887 | | Museum of Fine Arts, Boston | |
| John Singer Sargent * Medal (oils) | Portrait of a Boy - Homer Saint-Gaudens and His; Mother | | Oil on canvas | 1890 | | Carnegie Museum of Art, Pittsburgh, Pennsylvania | |
| John Singer Sargent * Medal (oils) | Portrait of Miss Helen Dunham | | Oil on canvas | 1892 | | Private collection | |
| John Singer Sargent * Medal (oils) | Portrait of Alice Vanderbilt Shepard | | Oil on canvas | 1888 | | Amon Carter Museum, Fort Worth, Texas | |
| John Singer Sargent * Medal (oils) | Study of an Egyptian Girl | | Oil on canvas | 1891 | | Art Institute of Chicago | |
| Emily Sartain | Marie | | Oil on canvas | 1881 | | Moore College of Art and Design, Philadelphia, Pennsylvania | |
| William Sartain | Sand Dunes at Manasquan | | Oil on canvas | ca.1890 | | | |
| William Sartain | Nubian Sheik | | Oil on canvas | ca.1886 | | Private collection, France | |
| Sarah Choate Sears * Medal (watercolors) | A Spanish Girl | | Watercolor | | | | |
| Sarah Choate Sears * Medal (watercolors) | Romola | | Watercolor | | | | |
| Sarah Choate Sears * Medal (watercolors) | Portrait | | Watercolor | | | | |
| Prosper Louis Senat | On the Nile Near Beni Hassan | | Oil on canvas | 1892 | | | |
| Prosper Louis Senat | In the Gulf of Ajaccio, Corsica | | Oil on canvas | | | | Possibly: Shipping off Corsica ? |
| Prosper Louis Senat | Capri, from Sorento; A Corner in San Remo; The River Bed in Ventimille; Head of the Creek, Kennebunkport, Maine | | Watercolors | | | | |
| Amanda Brewster Sewell | Sappho | | Oil on canvas | 1891 | | | |
| Amanda Brewster Sewell | Portrait of Mrs. Boudinot Keith | | Oil on canvas | ca.1888 | | | circular canvas, seated, 1/2-length |
| Amanda Brewster Sewell | Pleasures of the Past | | Oil on canvas | 1890 | | | |
| Amanda Brewster Sewell | By the River | | Oil on canvas | | | | |
| Amanda Brewster Sewell | A Sylvan Festival | | Oil on canvas | | | | |
| Amanda Brewster Sewell | Portrait of Mother and Son | | Oil on canvas | ca.1889 | | | |
| Amanda Brewster Sewell | Washing Place in the Gatinais | | Oil on canvas | 1886 | | | 4 women washing clothes in a pool |
| Amanda Brewster Sewell | Woman's Building: Arcadia | | Mural | | | | |
| Robert Van Vorst Sewell | Sea Urchins | | Oil on canvas | ca.1889 | | | |
| Robert Van Vorst Sewell | Boys Bathing (At the Swimming Hole) | | Oil on canvas | 1889 | | | |
| Robert Van Vorst Sewell | Diana Hunting; Winter; In Shanty Towns | | Oil on canvas | | | | |
| Warren Wood Sheppard | The Restless Sea | | Oil on canvas | ca.1886 | | Albright-Knox Gallery of Art, Buffalo, New York | |
| Rosina Emmet Sherwood | September; In the Orchard; Sunlight in the Orchard | | Watercolor | | | | |
| Rosina Emmet Sherwood | Woman's Building: The Republic's Welcome to Her Daughters | | Mural | | | | |
| Rosina Emmet Sherwood | Woman's Building (Connecticut Room): Portrait | | Watercolor | | | | |
| Rosina Emmet Sherwood | Woman's Building: Portrait | | Watercolor | | | | |
| Rosina Emmet Sherwood | Children's Building: Sleeping Child | | Watercolor | | | | |
| Thomas W. Shields | Cavalier—Time of Louis XIII | | Oil on canvas | 1881 | | Private collection, Alexandria, Virginia | |
| Walter Shirlaw | Tuning the Bell (Toning the Bell) | | Oil on canvas | 1874 | | Art Institute of Chicago | |
| Walter Shirlaw | Sheep Shearing in the Bavarian Highlands | | Oil on canvas | 1876 | | | Ex collection: St. Louis Art Museum |
| Walter Shirlaw | Rufina | | Oil on canvas | ca.1887-88 | | Century Association, Manhattan, NYC | |
| Walter Shirlaw | Manufactures and Liberal Arts Building: Gold; Silver; Pearl; Coral | | Murals | | | | Destroyed in the July 1894 fire |
| Edward Emerson Simmons * Medal (oils) | Early Moonlight upon Bay of St. Ives | | Oil on canvas | 1888 | | Mariners' Museum, Newport News, Virginia | |
| Edward Emerson Simmons * Medal (oils) | Darby and Joan | | Oil on canvas | | | | |
| Edward Emerson Simmons * Medal (oils) | The Carpenter's Son | | Oil on canvas | 1888 | | Private collection | |
| Edward Emerson Simmons * Medal (oils) | Manufactures and Liberal Arts Building: Wood Carving; Forging; Stone Cutting; Mechanical Appliances | | Murals | | | | Destroyed in the July 1894 fire |
| William Thomas Smedley * Medal (watercolors) | Embarrassment | | Oil on canvas | 1883 | | New Jersey State Museum, Trenton, New Jersey | |
| William Thomas Smedley * Medal (watercolors) | 6 illustrations of the Exposition under construction: Up Among the Great Iron Arches; Before the Agricultural Building; Site for the Statue of the Republic; Near the Hall of Mines; The Administration Building; Jackson Park: Now Part of the Exhibition Grounds | | Watercolors | 1892 | | | The illustrations were published in the October 1892 issue of Scribner's Magazine. |
| William Thomas Smedley * Medal (watercolors) | A Lazy Companion; There Could Be No Doubt | | Watercolor | | | | |
| De Cost Smith | Driven Back | | Oil on canvas | 1892 | | Birmingham Museum of Art, Birmingham, Alabama | |
| De Cost Smith | Sioux Lovers | | Oil on canvas | ca.1887 | | | |
| Theodore Clement Steele | On the Muscatatuck | | Oil on canvas | 1892 | 30 x 45 in | Columbia Club. Indianapolis, Indiana | |
| Theodore Clement Steele | September | | Oil on canvas | 1892 | | | |
| Alice Barber Stephens | Rainy-Day Effect in Philadelphia | | Oil on canvas | | | | Broad Street Station in fog Destroyed |
| Alice Barber Stephens | Harvesting on the Meadow | | Oil on canvas | | | | |
| Alice Barber Stephens | A Philadelphia Quaker (In the Meeting House) | | Watercolor | | | | |
| Alice Barber Stephens | Music; Their Perfume Flooded the House | | Watercolors | | | | |
| Alice Barber Stephens | Woman's Building: Michael Angelo Painting the Sistine Chapel; Michael Angelo; In a Country Church | | Watercolors | | | | |
| Julius LeBlanc Stewart | On the Yacht 'Namouna', Venice (Summer Pleasures) | | Oil on canvas | 1890 | | Wadsworth Athenaeum, Hartford, Connecticut | |
| Julius LeBlanc Stewart | The Hunt Ball | | Oil on canvas | 1889 | | Private collection | Ex Collection: The Essex Club, Newark, New Jersey |
| Julius LeBlanc Stewart | The Baptism | | Oil on canvas | 1892 | | Los Angeles County Museum of Art | |
| Julius LeBlanc Stewart | Venice | | Oil on canvas | 1887 | | | Ex collection: Kaiser Wilhelm II |
| Julius LeBlanc Stewart | Portrait of the Viscountess Gouy d'Arcy | | Oil on canvas | 1887 | | | |
| Julius LeBlanc Stewart | Portrait of the Baroness Benoist Mechin | | Oil on canvas | ca.1889 | | | 3/4 length, standing and looking at the viewer |
| James Madison Stone | Leukopis | | Oil on canvas | ca.1889 | | | |
| James Madison Stone | A Summer Dream | | Oil on canvas | 1890 | | | Sold at Skinner Auctions, Boston, 24 September 2010, Lot 576. |
| Julian Russell Story | An Incident of the French Revolution—Mlle. de Sombreuil | | Oil on canvas | 1887 | | | Ex collection: St. Louis Art Museum |
| Julian Russell Story | Portrait of My Father (William Wetmore Story) | | Oil on canvas | ca.1886-89 | | Private collection | |
| Julian Russell Story | Portrait of Mme. Eames Story | | Oil on canvas | ca.1891 | | Museum of Fine Arts, Boston | |
| Edmund C. Tarbell * Medal (oils) | Girl with Horse | | Oil on canvas | 1892 | | | |
| Edmund C. Tarbell * Medal (oils) | In the Orchard | | Oil on canvas | 1891 | | Art Institute of Chicago | |
| Edmund C. Tarbell * Medal (oils) | Portrait (My Sister Lydia) | | Oil on canvas | ca.1889 | | Museum of Fine Arts, Boston | |
| Abbott Handerson Thayer * Medal (oils) | Virgin Enthroned | | Oil on canvas | 1891 | | Smithsonian American Art Museum | |
| Abbott Handerson Thayer * Medal (oils) | Portrait of a Lady (Miss Bessie Stillman) | | Oil on canvas | 1883 | | Private collection | |
| Abbott Handerson Thayer * Medal (oils) | Brother and Sister - Portrait of the Artist's Children | | Oil on canvas | 1889 | | Smithsonian American Art Museum | |
| Frances Hunt Throop | Spring Carnations | | Oil on canvas | c.1893 | | | Sold at Heritage Auctions, Dallas, TX, 11 May 2013, Lot #64080 |
| Frances Hunt Throop | Portrait of a Lady | | Oil on canvas | | | | |
| Louis Comfort Tiffany * Medal (oils) * Medal (watercolors) | Market at Nuremberg | | Oil on canvas | ca.1893 | | Private collection | |
| Louis Comfort Tiffany * Medal (oils) * Medal (watercolors) | Pottery Market at Nuremberg | | Oil on canvas | ca.1892 | | Virginia Museum of Fine Arts, Richmond | |
| Louis Comfort Tiffany * Medal (oils) * Medal (watercolors) | Street in Algiers (Algerian Shops) | | Watercolor | ca.1889 | | Baltimore Museum of Art | |
| Louis Comfort Tiffany * Medal (oils) * Medal (watercolors) | Cathedral at Morlaix | | Watercolor | 1890 | | Private collection | |
| Louis Comfort Tiffany * Medal (oils) * Medal (watercolors) | Taming the Flamingoes | | Watercolor | 1888 | | Charles Hosmer Morse Museum of American Art, Winter Park, Florida | Tiffany later based a stained glass window on the painting. The window is also in the Morse Museum's collection. |
| Louis Comfort Tiffany * Medal (oils) * Medal (watercolors) | Cobblers at Bouferik Algeria; Summer; Street in Algiers | | Watercolor | | | | |
| Otto Toaspern | Music | | Oil on canvas | ca.1892 | | | |
| Stacy Tolman | The Etcher | | Oil on canvas | ca.1887-90 | | Metropolitan Museum of Art | |
| Frank Hector Tompkins | Mother and Sleeping Child | | Oil on canvas | | | | Ex collection: Boston Art Club |
| Frank Hector Tompkins | Good Friday | | Oil on canvas | ca.1888 | | | |
| William Brooke Thomas Trego | The Pursuit | | Oil on canvas | 1884 | | Private collection | |
| Gaylord Sangston Truesdell | The Shepherd's Lunch | | Oil on canvas | 1892 | | | |
| Gaylord Sangston Truesdell | Cows on the River Bank | | Oil on canvas | 1891 | | | |
| Dwight William Tryon * Medal (oils) | Midsummer Moonrise | | Oil on wood panel | 1892 | | Smithsonian American Art Museum | |
| Dwight William Tryon * Medal (oils) | Evening (New England Village, Evening) | | Oil on wood panel | 1886 | | Pennsylvania Academy of the Fine Arts | |
| Dwight William Tryon * Medal (oils) | Newport at Night | | Oil on wood panel | 1887 | | Private collection | |
| Dwight William Tryon * Medal (oils) | Daybreak, New Bedford Harbor | | Oil on wood panel | 1885 | | Rhode Island School of Design, Newport, Rhode Island | |
| Dwight William Tryon * Medal (oils) | Springtime | | Oil on canvas | 1892 | | Freer Gallery of Art, Washington, D.C. | |
| Dwight William Tryon * Medal (oils) | Autumn | | | | | Freer Gallery of Art, Washington, D.C. | |
| Dwight William Tryon * Medal (oils) | Morning | | | | | | |
| Dwight William Tryon * Medal (oils) | Sunset at Sea | | Oil on wood panel | 1889 | | Freer Gallery of Art, Washington, D.C. | |
| Dwight William Tryon * Medal (oils) | A Winter Afternoon | | | ca.1892 | | Private collection | |
| Dwight William Tryon * Medal (oils) | December—A Salt Marsh | | | 1892 | | Thomas Colville Fine Art, Guilford, Connecticut | Ex collection: Smith College Museum of Art |
| Dwight William Tryon * Medal (oils) | Moonrise—A Dewy Night; Starlight; Winter Evening; October | | Oils | | | | |
| Charles Yardley Turner * Medal (oils) | Courtship of Miles Standish | | Oil on canvas | 1884 | | | |
| Charles Yardley Turner * Medal (oils) | John Alden's Letter | | Oil on canvas | ca.1888 | | Union League Club of Chicago | |
| Charles Yardley Turner * Medal (oils) | The Coppersmith | | Oil on canvas | 1880 | | Private collection | |
| Charles Yardley Turner * Medal (oils) | The Grand Canal, Dordrecht | | Oil on canvas | 1881 | | | |
| Charles Yardley Turner * Medal (oils) | The Pride of the Farm | | Oil on canvas | ca.1890 | | | |
| Charles Yardley Turner * Medal (oils) | Saw Wood and Say Nothing | | Oil on canvas | 1891 | | | |
| Charles Yardley Turner * Medal (oils) | The Days That Are No More; Washing Day; Afternoon Tea; Gossips; On the Beach at Easthampton | | Oil on canvas | | | | |
| John Henry Twachtman * Medal (watercolors) | Brook in Winter | | Oil on canvas | ca.1893 | | Museum of Fine Arts, Boston | |
| John Henry Twachtman * Medal (watercolors) | The Brooklyn Bridge | | Oil on panel | 1887-88 | | | |
| John Henry Twachtman * Medal (watercolors) | Autumn Shadows; Decorative Landscape; Winter | | Oils | | | | |
| John Henry Twachtman * Medal (watercolors) | Pier Near Newport | | Watercolor | ca.1893 | | | |
| John Henry Twachtman * Medal (watercolors) | Winter | | Watercolor | | | | |
| Charles Frederic Ulrich * Medal (oils) | Glass Blowers of Murano | | Oil on wood panel | 1886 | | Metropolitan Museum of Art | |
| Charles Frederic Ulrich * Medal (oils) | In the Land of Promise | | Oil on wood panel | 1884 | | National Gallery of Art | Ex collection: Corcoran Gallery of Art |
| Charles Frederic Ulrich * Medal (oils) | An Italian Idyl | | Oil on wood panel | | | | |
| Eugene Lawrence Vail | On the Thames | | Oil on canvas | 1886 | | Private collection, Knoxville, Tennessee | |
| Eugene Lawrence Vail | Dordrecht | | Oil on canvas | | | | |
| Luther Emerson Van Gorder | The Terrace, Central Park, New York | | Oil on canvas | ca.1891 | | | |
| Elihu Vedder * Medal (oils) | In the Lair of the Sea Serpent | | Oil on canvas | 1864 | | Museum of Fine Arts, Boston | Vedder painted a second version, c.1899. |
| Elihu Vedder * Medal (oils) | The Fisherman and the Genie | | Oil on canvas | ca.1863 | | Museum of Fine Arts, Boston | |
| Elihu Vedder * Medal (oils) | A Soul in Bondage | | Oil on canvas | 1891-92 | | Brooklyn Museum | |
| Elihu Vedder * Medal (oils) | A Venetian Model | | Oil on canvas | 1878 | | Columbus Museum of Art, Columbus, Ohio | |
| Elihu Vedder * Medal (oils) | The Young Marsyas | | Oil on canvas | 1878 | | Crystal Bridges Museum of American Art, Bentonville, Arkansas | |
| Elihu Vedder * Medal (oils) | The Cup of Love | | Oil on canvas | ca.1884 | | Metropolitan Museum of Art | |
| Elihu Vedder * Medal (oils) | The Roe's Egg | | Oil on panel | 1868 | | Chrysler Museum, Norfolk, Virginia | |
| Elihu Vedder * Medal (oils) | The Sorrowing Soul Between Doubt and Faith | | Oil on panel | ca.1886-87 | | Johnson Museum of Art, Cornell University, Ithaca, New York | |
| Elihu Vedder * Medal (oils) | Head of Samson; Head of Delilah; Morning | | Oils | | | | |
| Frederic Porter Vinton * Medal (oils) | Portrait of a Lady (Annie Peirce Vinton, the artist's wife) | | Oil on canvas | | | Private collection, Cape Elizabeth, Maine | |
| Frederic Porter Vinton * Medal (oils) | Portrait of Theodore Chase | | Oil on canvas | 1886 | | University of Michigan Museum of Art | |
| Frederic Porter Vinton * Medal (oils) | Portrait of Christopher Columbus Langdell | | Oil on canvas | 1892 | | Harvard University Law School, Cambridge, Massachusetts | |
| Frederic Porter Vinton * Medal (oils) | Portrait of Augustus Flagg | | Oil on canvas | | | | Sold at Skinner Auctions, Boston, 20 September 2013, Lot 727. |
| Douglas Volk * Medal (oils) | Mending the Canoe | | Oil on canvas | | | | |
| Douglas Volk * Medal (oils) | Puritan Maid | | Oil on canvas | 1881 | | | |
| Douglas Volk * Medal (oils) | Portrait of Madame X (Beatrice Goodrich Lowry) | | Oil on canvas | | | Private collection | |
| Robert Vonnoh * Medal (oils) | November | | Oil on canvas | 1888 | | Pennsylvania Academy of the Fine Arts | |
| Robert Vonnoh * Medal (oils) | Companion of the Studio | | Oil on canvas | 1888 | | Pennsylvania Academy of the Fine Arts | |
| Robert Vonnoh * Medal (oils) | Dr. Jacob Mendez DaCosta | | Oil on canvas | 1893 | | Mutter Museum, Philadelphia, Pennsylvania | |
| Robert Vonnoh * Medal (oils) | Moist Weather, France | | Oil on canvas | 1890 | | | |
| Robert Vonnoh * Medal (oils) | Show What You Can Do! | | Oil on canvas | 1890 | | Private collection | |
| Robert Vonnoh * Medal (oils) | Bad News (Sad News) | | Oil on canvas | 1889 | | | |
| Robert Vonnoh * Medal (oils) | Early Morning; Viola; Blanche; Duxbury Bay; Riva degli Schiavoni, Venice; A Dull Day; Now Behave Pretty | | Oil on canvas | | | | |
| Henry Oliver Walker * Medal (oils) | The Gift-Bearer | | Oil on canvas | | | | |
| Henry Oliver Walker * Medal (oils) | Hagar and Ishmael | | Oil on canvas | 1892 | | Flint Institute of Arts, Flint, Michigan | |
| Henry Oliver Walker * Medal (oils) | Boy on the Donkey | | Oil on canvas | 1889 | | | |
| Horatio Walker * Medal (oils) | A Stable Interior (Milking) | | Oil on canvas | 1887 | | Art Gallery of Ontario, Toronto, Ontario | |
| Ida Waugh | Hagar and Ishmael | | Oil on canvas | ca.1892 | | | Ex collection: Pennsylvania Academy of the Fine Arts |
| Ida Waugh | Woman's Building (Gallery of Honor): Pierrot | | Oil on canvas | | | | |
| Ida Waugh | Woman's Building (Rotunda): Four Babies | | Oil on canvas | | | | |
| Ida Waugh | Pennsylvania State Building: All in Four Seconds; Jerta | | | | | | |
| Charles T. Weber | The Underground Railroad | | Oil on canvas | 1893 | | Cincinnati Art Museum | |
| Carl Weber | Trout Stream Near Dingman's Ferry | | Oil on canvas | | | Reading Public Museum, Reading, Pennsylvania | |
| Edwin Lord Weeks | Three Beggars of Cordova | | Oil on canvas | ca.1891 | | Pennsylvania Academy of the Fine Arts | |
| Edwin Lord Weeks | The Last Voyage: A Souvenir of the Ganges | | Oil on canvas | 1885 | | Private collection | |
| Edwin Lord Weeks | Interior of Studio; Two Hindoo Fakirs; Study at Bombay; Marble Court at Agra; Persian Horse Dealers | | Oil on canvas | | | | |
| John Ferguson Weir | Portrait of Admiral Farragut | | Oil on canvas | 1889 | | University Club, Manhattan, NYC | |
| John Ferguson Weir | Forging the Shaft | | Oil on canvas | 1874-77 | | Metropolitan Museum of Art | |
| Julian Alden Weir * Medal (oils) | The Open Book | | Oil on canvas | 1891 | | Smithsonian American Art Museum | |
| Julian Alden Weir * Medal (oils) | The Christmas Tree | | Oil on canvas | ca.1890 | | Private collection | |
| Julian Alden Weir * Medal (oils) | Portrait of Alexander Webb Weir | | Oil on canvas | 1892 | | Spencer Museum of Art, University of Kansas | |
| Julian Alden Weir * Medal (oils) | The Lane | | Oil on canvas | ca.1890 | | Phillips Collection, Washington, D.C. | |
| Julian Alden Weir * Medal (oils) | The Young Student; Autumn; Summerland | | Oil on canvas | | | | |
| Julian Alden Weir * Medal (oils) | Manufactures Building: Decorative Art; The Art of Painting; The Art of Pottery | | Murals | | | | Destroyed in the July 1894 fire |
| James McNeill Whistler * Medal (oils) | Arrangement in Black: Lady in the Yellow Buskin (Lady Archibald Campbell) | | Oil on canvas | ca.1883 | | Philadelphia Museum of Art | |
| James McNeill Whistler * Medal (oils) | The Chelsea Girl | | Oil on canvas | ca.1884-86 | | Private collection | |
| James McNeill Whistler * Medal (oils) | The Princess of the Land of Porcelain | | Oil on canvas | 1863-65 | | Freer Gallery, Smithsonian Institution, Washington, D.C. | |
| James McNeill Whistler * Medal (oils) | Arrangement in Black and Brown: The Fur Jacket | | Oil on canvas | 1876 | | Worcester Art Museum, Worcester, Massachusetts | |
| James McNeill Whistler * Medal (oils) | Nocturne in Blue and Gold - Valparaiso | | Oil on canvas | 1866 | | Freer Gallery, Smithsonian Institution, Washington, D.C. | |
| James McNeill Whistler * Medal (oils) | Harmony in Blue and Silver - Trouville | | Oil on canvas | 1865 | | Isabella Stewart Gardner Museum, Boston, Massachusetts | |
| Sarah Wyman Whitman | Portrait of Oliver Wendell Holmes | | Oil on canvas | 1892 | | Philadelphia College of Physicians | |
| William John Whittemore | Autumn Sunshine (also called A Quiet Street) | | Oil on canvas | ca. 1891 | | Edward and Deborah Pollack Fine Art, Palm Beach | Sold at the World's Columbian Exposition |
| Worthington Whittredge | Rhode Island Coast | | Oil on canvas | ca.1880 | | Amon Carter Museum, Fort Worth, Texas | |
| Worthington Whittredge | The Plains (Crossing the Ford, Platt River, Colorado) | | Oil on canvas | ca.1868-70 | | Century Association, Manhattan, NYC | Related work: Indians Crossing the Platt River |
| Worthington Whittredge | The Old Hunting Grounds | | Oil on canvas | 1864 | | Reynolda House Museum of American Art, Winston-Salem, North Carolina | |
| Carleton Wiggins | In Midsummer | | Oil on canvas | ca.1893 | | | |
| Carleton Wiggins | Evening, Village of Grez | | Oil on canvas | ca.1881 | | | |
| Carleton Wiggins | Clouds and Sunshine | | Oil on canvas | | | | |
| Irving Ramsey Wiles * Medal (oils) | The Sonata | | Oil on canvas | 1889 | | Fine Arts Museums of San Francisco | |
| Irving Ramsey Wiles * Medal (oils) | Sunlight in the Studio | | Oil on canvas | 1888 | | | Sold at Skinner Auctions, Boston, 23 January 2015, Lot 490. |
| Irving Ramsey Wiles * Medal (oils) | Portraits (Double portrait of the artist's parents, Lemuel Maynard Wiles and Rachel Ramsey) | | Oil on canvas | 1889 | | National Gallery of Art | Ex collection: Corcoran Gallery of Art |
| Irving Ramsey Wiles * Medal (oils) | Sunshine and Flowers | | Oil on canvas | c.1892 | | | |
| Irving Ramsey Wiles * Medal (oils) | A Girl in Black (Chase); Lady in Green | | | | | | |
| John Henry Witt | The Celestial Choir | | Oil on canvas | | | | 5 angels in flight |
| Alexander Helwig Wyant | Forenoon in the Adirondacks | | Oil on canvas | 1884 | | | Ex collection: Metropolitan Museum of Art |
| Alexander Helwig Wyant | A North Woods Brook | | Oil on canvas | | | | Ex collection: Thomas B. Clarke |
| Alexander Helwig Wyant | Sunset in the Woods | | Oil on canvas | | | | |
| Alexander Helwig Wyant | Clearing Off at Sunset | | Oil on canvas | 1891-92 | | San Diego Museum of Art | |
| Alexander Helwig Wyant | An October Day | | Oil on canvas | ca.1888 | | Rhode Island School of Design, Providence, Rhode Island | |
| Alexander Helwig Wyant | Sunset | | Oil on canvas | | | New Britain Museum of American Art, New Britain, Connecticut | |
| Alexander Helwig Wyant | Landscape in the Adirondacks | | Oil on canvas | 1885-86 | | Metropolitan Museum of Art | |
| Alexander Helwig Wyant | Stream in the Woods | | Oil on canvas | ca.1881 | | | |
| Alexander Helwig Wyant | Landscape (The Mountain Road) | | Oil on canvas | ca.1884 | | | Lent by Thomas B. Clarke, 1893 |
| Alexander Helwig Wyant | Evening (Lent by Wyant's widow); The Storm | | Oil on canvas | | | | |
| Charles Morris Young | Wet Weather | | Oil on canvas | | | | |
| Charles Morris Young | Harvest of Death—The Wheatfield at Gettysburg | | Oil on canvas | 1892 | | | |
| Charles Morris Young | The Forest | | Watercolor | | | | |
