= Pauline Dohn Rudolph =

American painter (1865–1934)

- Born: Pauline Amalie Dohn; 1865; Chicago, Illinois
- Died: 1934 (aged 68–69)
- Known for: Painting
- Spouse: Franklin Rudolph (m. 1901–1922) (his death)

Pauline Dohn Rudolph (1865–1934) was an American painter. She was also a founder of the Chicago Palette Club.

== Early years ==
Dohn was born in Chicago in 1865. She studied art at the Chicago Academy of Fine Arts and then at the Pennsylvania Academy of Fine Arts in Philadelphia, where she studied with Thomas Eakins and Thomas Anschutz. She later moved to Paris and enrolled at the Académie Julian, studying with Boulanger and Lefebvre.

== Career ==
Returning to Chicago, she founded and exhibited at the Palette Club before accepting a teaching position at the Chicago Academy of Fine Arts. Dohn exhibited at least four works at the 1893 World's Columbian Exposition in Chicago—the mural Industrial Arts for the Reception Room of the Illinois State Building, as well as paintings in the Palace of Fine Arts and The Woman's Building.

== Later life ==
Dohn married Franklin Rudolph in 1901, with whom she had three children. She moved to California in 1933, where she died on June 19, 1934.

== See also ==
- List of American painters exhibited at the 1893 World's Columbian Exposition

== Gallery ==
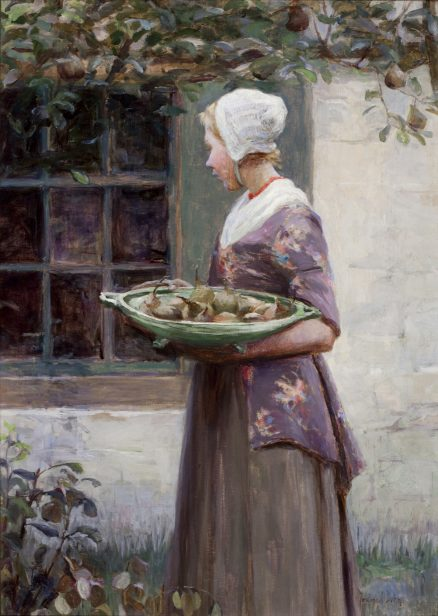
Pear-Time, 1895

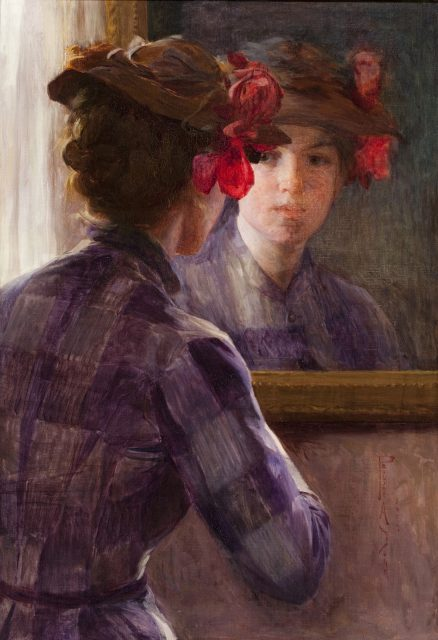
A Village Belle, 1899

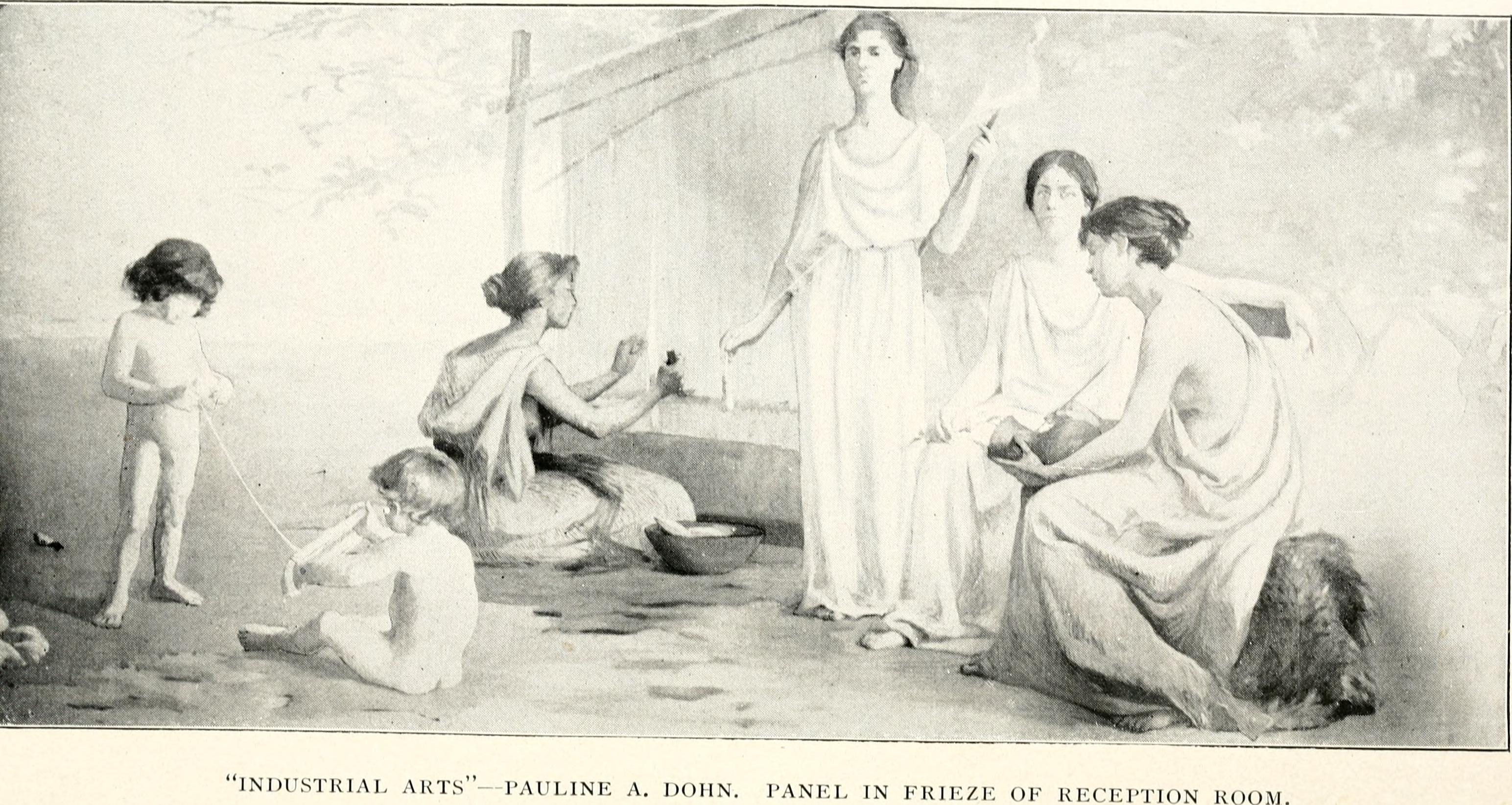
Mural: Industrial Arts, exhibited at the 1893 World's Columbian Exposition, Chicago

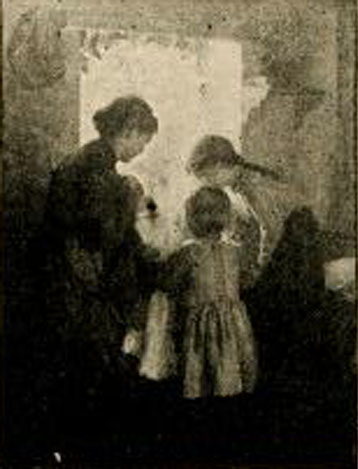
What the Storks Brought, exhibited at the 1893 World's Columbian Exposition, Chicago
