= Frederic Porter Vinton =

American painter (1846–1911)

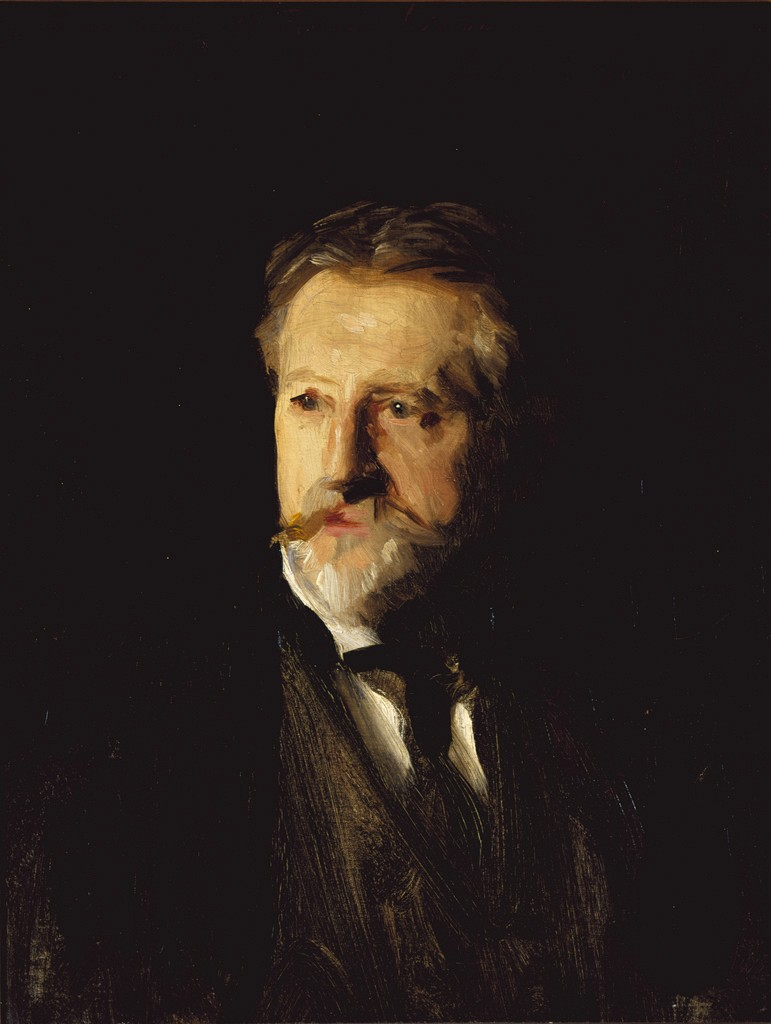
- 1903 portrait by John Singer Sargent
- Born: January 29, 1846; Bangor, Maine, US
- Died: May 19, 1911 (aged 65); Boston, Massachusetts, US
- Known for: Painting
- Movement: Impressionism

Frederic Porter Vinton (January 29, 1846 – May 19, 1911), sometimes spelled Frederick, was an American painter.

== Life ==
He was born in Bangor, Maine. He grew up in Chicago, and moved to Boston in 1861 For twenty years he worked as a bookkeeper, during which he studied art under William Rimmer at the Lowell Institute. Soon after studying at the Institute, he wrote an art review for the Boston Advertiser. He opened a portrait studio in Boston in 1878. After his studio picked up business, he traveled abroad in Europe for eighteen months, then returned to marry Annie M. Pierce on June 27, 1883. His first exhibition was in 1880, which showed a portrait of his. He contributed his art to the exhibit every year until 1883, in which political unrest in the Academy in which the exhibit belonged forced him to resign for a year. In 1884, he submitted "Street in Toledo", the first of his landscapes to be submitted. Everything before it was a portrait of some kind. In 1891, he was elected a full member of the National Academy of Design, New York City.

Frederic moved to Chicago with his parents when he was ten. Then, five years later, his family moved to Boston. After first working as a clerk, he for short time was a banker, and then worked as a bookkeeper. While a bookkeeper, he began studying art under William Rimmer of the Lowell Institute. Upon prompting from Rimmer, Vinton sent a review of some local artwork to the Boston Advertiser. In 1878, he began his artistic career by starting a small portrait studio in Boston.

Vinton married Annie M. Peirce on June 27, 1883, after an eighteen-month trip across Europe, visiting the Netherlands, France, and Germany. Some of his most famous paintings of portraits of his young wife.

== Paintings ==
Frederic specialized in portraits, although he had done some landscapes, such as "Street in Toledo" and "River View, Spring". His paintings have been described as impressionistic. Some critiques have gone as far as to say his work was, more specifically, pre-1940's impressionism. His work was also highly influenced by his European travels, and his studies under many important artists of the time. It is associated with the Boston School of painting.

== European travels ==
"River View, Spring" A landscape by Frederic Porter Vinton. Circa. 1880

Frederic spent much of his time traveling the European continent, and it has influenced his work and differentiated it from the American work of the same time, with one reviewer even calling him "an aristocrat of the old school". In 1875, he traveled to Paris and studied under Léon Bonnat for a season. In 1876, he spent a year in Munich in which he spent his time learning under the teachings of Frank Duveneck and the Royal Academy of Munich. Later, he returned to Paris for two years, citing his dislike of the German method of impressionism, which included artists such as Lovis Corinth or Max Liebermann. While back in France, joined the Acadèmie Julian and was taught under Jean-Paul Laurens. In 1882, he traveled to Spain with Robert Blum and William Merritt Chase. The three artists spent time in Madrid and Toledo, and Frederic studied portraiture by studying Velázquez's previous work.

== Death ==
Vinton died of a bronchial affection in his home in Boston on May 20, 1911. After his death, Mrs. Frederic Porter Vinton released some of his paintings to assorted exhibits.

== See also ==
- List of American painters exhibited at the 1893 World's Columbian Exposition

== Notes ==
Attribution:

- Chisholm, Hugh, ed. (1911). "Vinton, Frederic Porter" . Encyclopædia Britannica. Vol. 28 (11th ed.). Cambridge University Press. p. 101.
