= Fannie Eliza Duvall =

American painter

- Born: September 8, 1861; Port Byron, New York
- Died: November 3, 1934 (aged 73); Los Angeles, California
- Known for: Painting

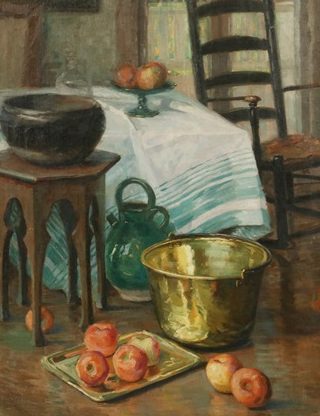
Interior

Fannie Eliza Duvall (September 8, 1861 – November 3, 1934) was an American painter, born in Port Byron, New York, and active in the United States and France.

== Career ==
Duvall began her art studies with William Sartain at the Art Students League and at Cooper Union. From New York she moved to Paris where she studied at Whistler’s school, popularly known as Académie Carmen since it was run by James Abbott McNeill Whistler’s ex-model, Carmen Rossi, and at the Académie de la Grande Chaumière with Olga Boznańska and Antonio de La Gándara.

Duvall moved to California in 1888 and exhibited two paintings at the 1893 World's Columbian Exposition. One of them, Chrysanthemum Garden in Southern California was destroyed by a fire in 1991 Other works of hers can be found at the Strong Museum in Rochester, New York, Bowers Museum in Santa Barbara, California and the Johathan Club in Los Angeles

Duvall was a member of the California Art Club, American Federation of Arts, Los Angeles Art Association, and the Laguna Beach Art Association. She died in Los Angeles, California on November 3, 1934.
