= Clara Taggart MacChesney =

American painter

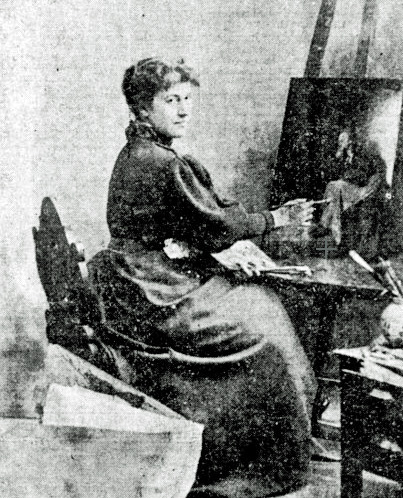
- Clara Taggart MacChesney, 1899
- Born: 1860; Brownsville, California
- Died: August 6, 1928 (aged 67–68); London, England
- Known for: Painting

Clara Taggart MacChesney (sometimes McChesney) (1860/61-1928) was an American painter and writer known for her figurative painting, landscapes and “scenes and people of Holland.”

== Biography ==
Born in Brownsville, California, Clara Taggart MacChesney moved with her family to Oakland when she was young where her father, Joseph B. McChesney, was principal of Oakland High School.

MacChesney began her art studies in San Francisco with Virgil Williams at the California School of Design, before moving to New York City to continue her studies with H. S. Mowbray and J. C. Beckwith. This was followed by a move to Paris, where she enrolled in the Académie Colarossi and studied with Courtois.

McChesney in her studio, circa 1905, photographed by Jessie Tarbox Beals

MacChesney exhibited watercolors at the 1893 World's Columbian Exposition in Chicago, and was awarded a medal for her work. An article in The San Francisco Call announced that she had placed two paintings in the 1900 World's Exposition in Paris, and remarked that: "Both American and foreign artists have referred to Miss McChesney as 'America's foremost woman painter.' " She would later exhibit at the 1904 St. Louis World's Fair, winning a bronze medal.

She also wrote and published pieces for New York art publications, “frequently on her lifelong friend Elizabeth Nourse.”

MacChesney lived in Carmel-by-the-Sea, California in the 1920s. She wrote about Carmel-by-the-Sea and its pageant and drama in the New-York Tribune.

Paints on canvas; paints in words. Portraits her specialty and has turned the trick of feature work on both New York Times and Tribune. Twenty-two times across the ocean and maintains a studio in Carmel.

— George Sterling

She died in London on August 6, 1928.

== Gallery ==
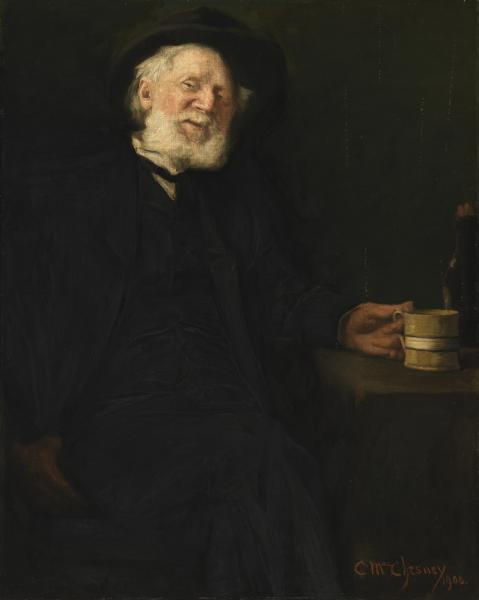
A Good Story (Portrait of Robert Loftin Newman), 1900

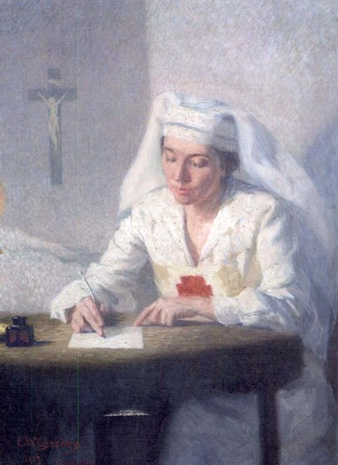
The Last Letter, 1917

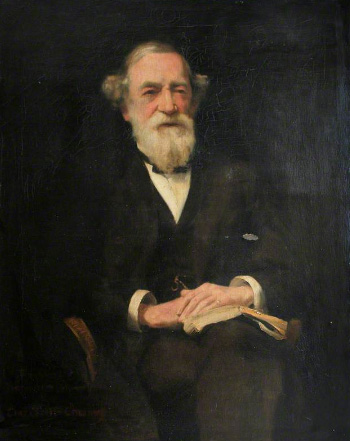
portrait of Moncure Daniel Conway

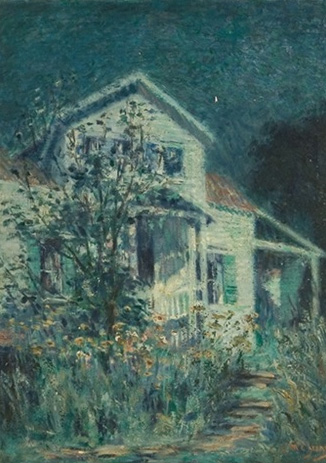
White House, Evening

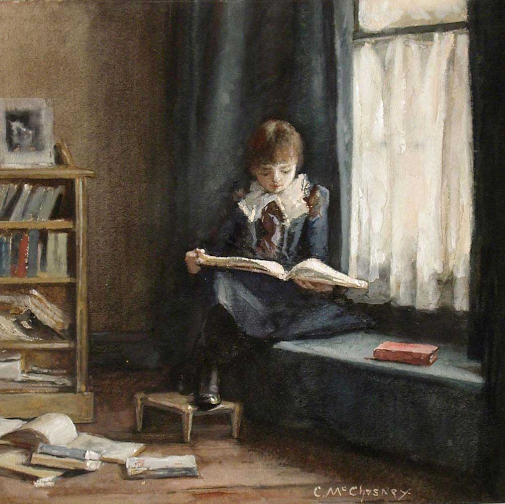
Girl Reading by a Window

== Works ==
- A Good Story (Portrait of Robert Loftin Newman), (1900) Smithsonian American Art Museum, Washington, D.C.
- Still Life with Plate and Kettle, National Arts Club, Manhattan, New York City
- Hay Barges, San Francisco, Oakland Museum, Oakland, California
- Portrait of Governor George C. Pardee (1911), California State Capitol, Sacramento
