= John Ward Dunsmore =

John Ward Dunsmore (February 29, 1856 - 1945) was an American painter who during his career was known as one of the United States' most prominent painters of murals and historical subjects.

== Biography ==
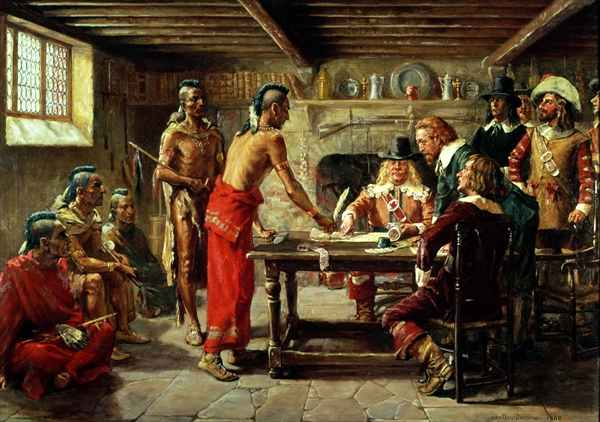
Signing the Treaty with the Indians April 22, 1642, a 1908 portrait by Dunsore

Dunsmore was in Paris from 1875 to 1879, where he studied at the Petite Ecole with Aimée Millet and privately with Thomas Couture. In 1879, Dunsmore drew a deathbed portrait of Couture.

Dunsmore painted a number of murals depicting various scenes from the American Revolution for Fraunces Tavern in Lower Manhattan. His works are known for their exacting painstakingly researched historical detail and for the elaborate staging and dressings of models the artist produced in his studio. His painting of Wolfgang Amadeus Mozart titled Mozart was exhibited at the 1893 World's Columbian Exposition held in Chicago.

Works by Dunsmore are in the permanent collections of among other institutions and venues the National Portrait Gallery in Washington D.C., The Fraunces Tavern Museum, and the New York Historical Society.

Dunsmore's was president of the Cincinnati Art Club from 1899 to 1902.
