= Sheldon Orrin Parsons =

American artist

- Born: April 3, 1866; Newark, New York, US
- Died: September 24, 1943 (aged 77); Albuquerque, New Mexico, US
- Occupation: Painter
- Known for: Founding the Santa Fe arts colony

Sheldon Orrin Parsons (April 3, 1866–September 24, 1943) was an American artist. A painter, he produced portraits, landscapes, and New Deal promotions. He studied at the National Academy of Design with William Merritt Chase, Edgar Ward, and William Low.

After the death of his wife, photographer Caroline Reed Parsons, and contracting tuberculosis, he moved with his daughter Sara to Santa Fe, New Mexico in 1913, where he often showed his work at the Palace of the Governors. He became known for his paintings of landscapes, pueblos, and figures. He moved into the house once owned by Padre Gallegos on Washington Avenue. He became the first director of the New Mexico Museum of Fine Art in 1918.
