= Harry Siddons Mowbray =

American painter (1858–1928)

Henry Siddons Mowbray
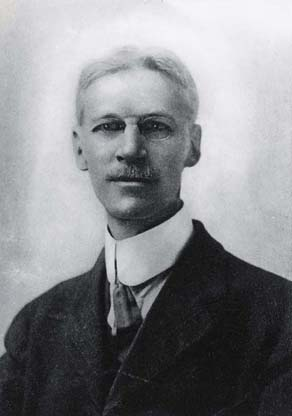
- Born: Henry Siddons; August 5, 1858; Alexandria, Egypt
- Died: January 13, 1928 (aged 69); Washington, Connecticut
- Education: Alfred C. Howland, Léon Bonnat
- Movement: Orientalism

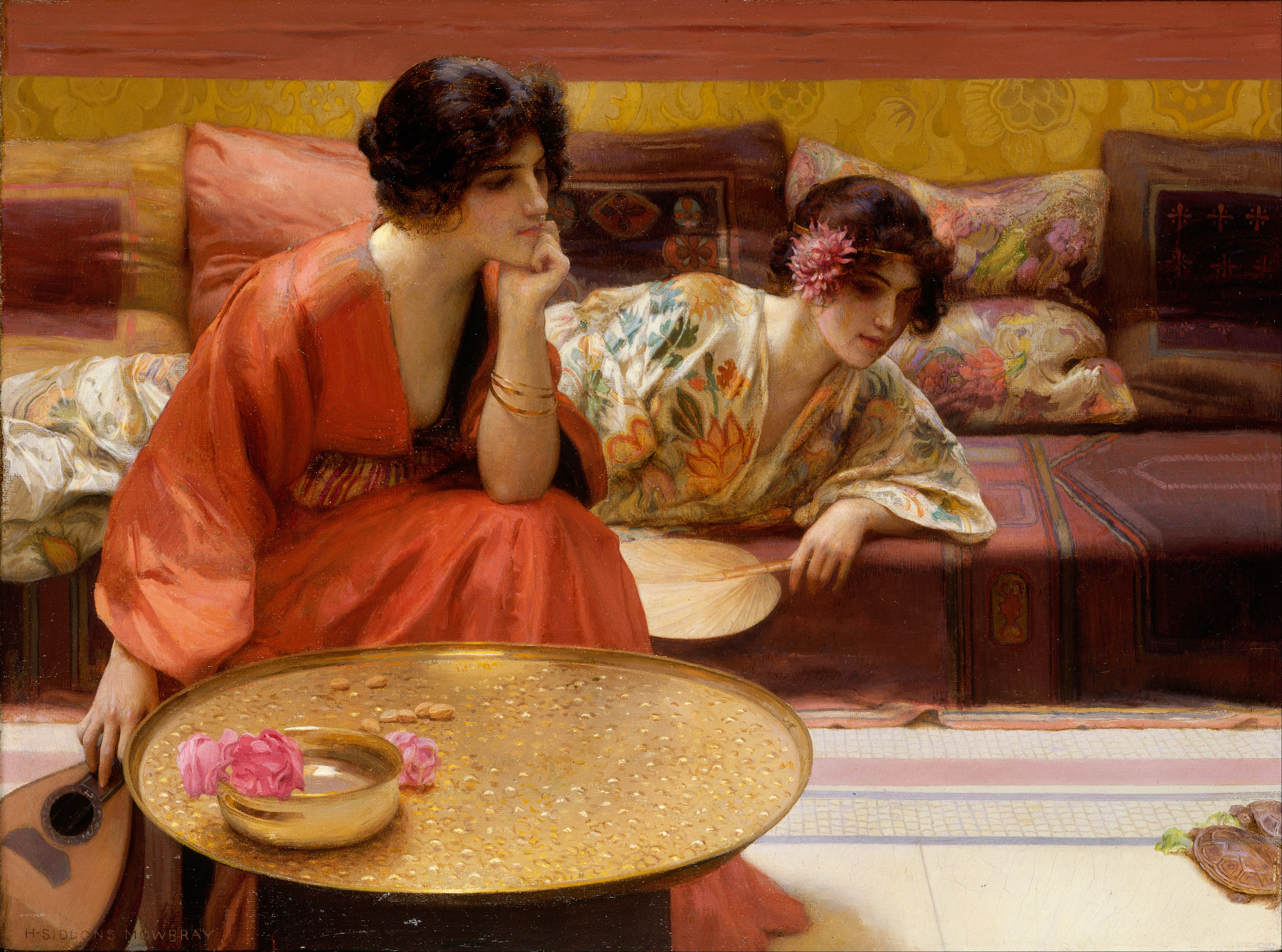
Idle Hours, 1895, at the Smithsonian American Art Museum

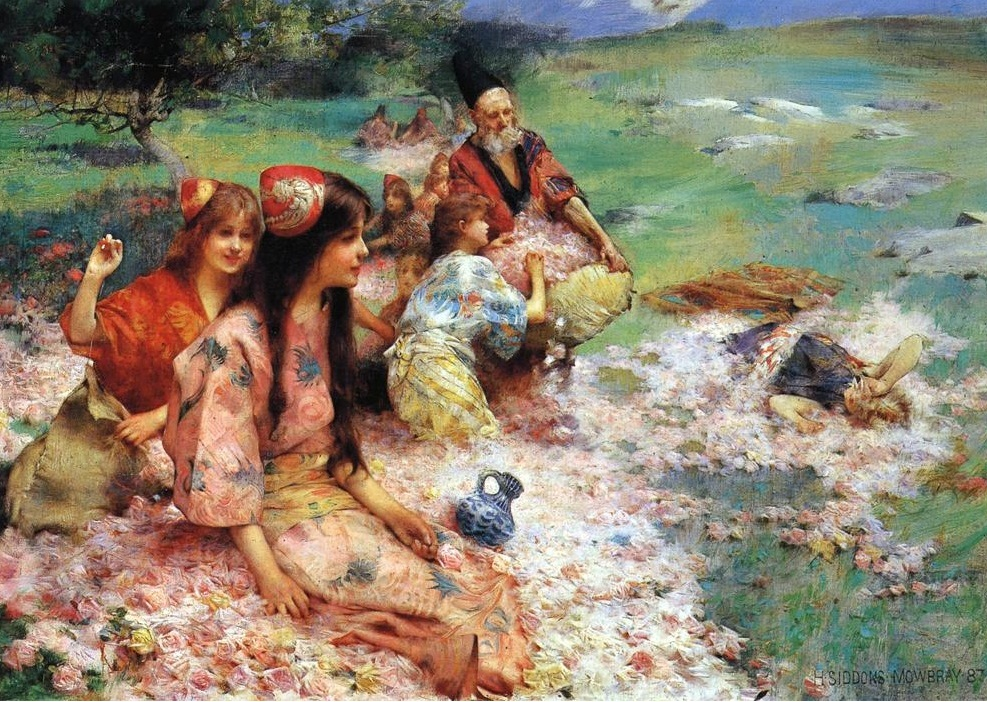
Rose Harvest, 1887, Mint Museum of Art, Charlotte NC.

Henry Siddons Mowbray (August 5, 1858 – 1928) was an American artist. He executed various painting commissions for J.P. Morgan, F.W. Vanderbilt, and other clients. He served as director of the American Academy in Rome from 1902 to 1904.

== Early life ==
Mowbray was born of English parents at Alexandria, Egypt. His father, John Henry Siddons, represented a British bank in Alexandria; he died of hyperthermia a year after his son was born. Mowbray's mother moved to America with her son. When Mowbray was five, his mother died, burnt alive in a domestic accident caused by lamp fuel. Left an orphan, the boy was adopted by his aunt, his mother's sister, and her husband, George Mowbray. The family settled at North Adams, Massachusetts. After a year at the United States Military Academy at West Point, he went to Paris and entered the atelier of Leon Bonnat in 1879, his first picture, Aladdin, bringing him to public notice. He studied with Bonnat until 1883.

== Artistic career ==
In 1886, he became a member of the Society of American Artists. His painting Evening Breeze received the Clark Prize at the National Academy of Design in 1888, and he was elected to associate membership in the academy. He was made a full member of the academy in 1891.

Subsequently, Mowbray was best known for his decorative work, especially the ceiling for the mansion of F. W. Vanderbilt in Hyde Park, New York, circa 1899; and The Transmission of the Law, Appellate Court House; the ceilings in J.P. Morgan's Library and The Morgan Library & Museum's Annex building; as well as the ceiling and walls of the library of the University Club, all in New York City. This last was executed in Rome, where, in 1903, he was made director of the American Academy. Other works include murals in the homes of C.P. Huntington and Larz Anderson; and the Howard M. Metzenbaum U.S. Courthouse in Cleveland, Ohio. He taught at the Art Students League of New York circa 1901. He was a member of the U.S. Commission of Fine Arts from 1921 to 1928.

Among Mowbray's pupils were the painters Mortimer Lichtenauer, Florence Wolf Gotthold and Clara Taggart MacChesney.

== See also ==
- Léon Bonnat
- List of Orientalist artists
- Orientalism
