= Frank C. Penfold =

American painter (1849–1921)

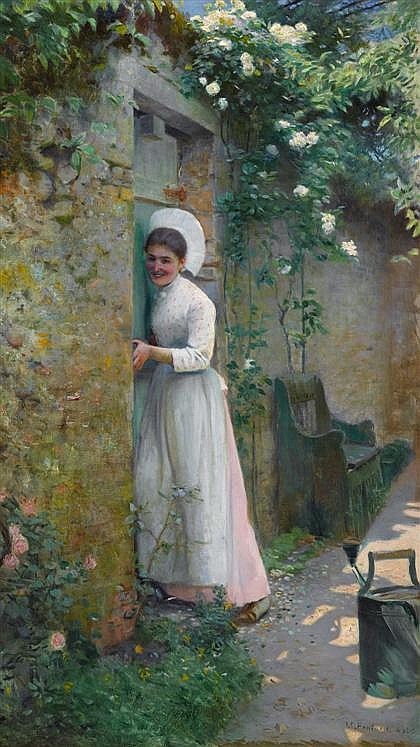
Frank C. Penfold: By the Garden Door (1893)

Frank (Francis) Crawford Penfold (1849–1921) was an American artist and teacher, remembered for his genre, landscape and portrait paintings, many of which he completed while living in Pont-Aven in Brittany.

== Biography ==
Son of the English-born American painter William Penfold (1827–1875), he was brought up in Lockport, New York. Although his father wanted him to become an engraver, his talent for painting was noticed at school. Thereafter his father instructed him in portraiture and other styles of painting.

In 1875, Penfold successfully presented two paintings at the Buffalo Society of Artists exhibition: Summer Rambles and The Kitchen Door. In 1877, he decided to continue his studies in France where he arrived in 1877. He settled in Pont-Aven, Brittany, where he taught some of those who belonged to the growing colony of artists. His painting Death of the First Born or La Mort du nouveau-né, exhibited at the Paris Salon of 1882, enjoyed considerable success. It was only the second work by an American to be purchased by the State, the first being Le Retour by Henry Mosler in 1879. His drawing of the interior of the Inn "La Mère Gloanec" in Pont-Aven dates from 1882. In 1884, he attended the Académie Julian in Paris. He spent most of the remainder of his life in Pont-Aven but returned for short stays in Buffalo where he exhibited, often at the Albright Art Gallery, selling many of his paintings there. He also continued to exhibit at the Paris Salons as well as at other American galleries including the Pennsylvania Academy of Fine Arts. Penfold became an influential figure in Buffalo, occasionally teaching at the Buffalo Fine Arts Academy. In 1896, he became president of the Buffalo Society of Artists in 1896.

Penfold's wife died on May 2, 1921. Distraught over her death, Penfold committed suicide by drowning in Concarneau, Brittany. His daughter, Jane Green Penfold, born in 1893, also became an artist.

== See also ==
- List of Orientalist artists
- Orientalism
