= Hallgarten (disambiguation) =

Hallgarten is a surname.

Hallgarten may also refer to:

- Hallgarten (Pfalz), a municipality in Rhineland-Palatinate, Germany
- Hallgarten (Rheingau), a Stadtteil of Oestrich-Winkel, Hesse, Germany
- Hallgarten Prize, a design prize won by George Henry Bogert among others
- Hallgarten Hall, a Dartmouth College building
