= William Bliss Baker =

American artist (1859–1886)

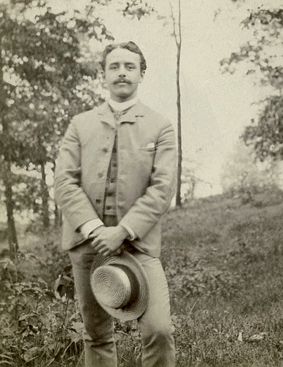
- Baker, ca.1880-1886
- Born: November 27, 1859; New York City, US
- Died: November 20, 1886 (aged 26); Hoosick Falls, New York, US
- Education: M.F.H. de Haas; Albert Bierstadt
- Known for: Painting
- Notable work: Fallen Monarchs; Morning After the Snow
- Movement: Hudson River School; Realism
- Awards: Elliott Prize for Drawing (1879); Third Hallgarten Prize (1884)

William Bliss Baker (November 27, 1859 – November 20, 1886) was an American artist who began painting around the closing period of the Hudson River School. Baker began his studies in 1876 at the National Academy of Design, where he studied with Bierstadt and de Haas. He later maintained studios in Clifton Park, New York, and New York City, where he painted in oils and watercolors. He completed more than 130 paintings, including several in black and white.

At age 26, Baker was beginning to enjoy wide recognition as a landscape painter when he died at his father's house at Hoosick Falls, New York, following an ice skating accident. The New York Times said that his death "deprived America of one of its most promising artists."

== Biography ==
=== Early life and family ===
Baker was born November 27, 1859, (Note: Turnure. Paragraph 7. "William Bliss Baker.—One of the prize winners in the National Academy exhibition of 1884, Mr. Baker, has been selected as a worthy exponent of our best landscape art. Though a young man, not yet twenty-five years of age, he has already acquired an enviable reputation in the art world. Born November 27th, 1859, at New York he began his course of study in the National Academy Schools in 1876 and first exhibited at the Academy in 1879. Since then he has had work in the exhibitions of Boston, Philadelphia, Cincinnati, Louisville, the Society of American Artists, the Water Color Society and the Salmagundi Club. His principal pictures are Woodland Brook, In the old Pasture, Silence, Woodland Study, Green Pasture—July, April Sunshine, November Gray, April Snow, Brook in Spring.") in New York City, the son of Yale alumnus Benjamin Franklin Baker (b. 1834) and Harriette Luisa Bayeux (married 1857). Harriette was descended from well-to-do Huguenots who moved from France to New York before the American Revolutionary War. Benjamin's father was Ellis Baker (1793–1873), director of the Albany City Bank, Albany Mutual Insurance Company, and People's Line Steamboats, as well as founder of Albany Rural Cemetery and Albany Hospital. He also operated stagecoach lines from Albany to Boston as well as north and west of Albany.

William's best-known brother was Captain Guy Ellis Baker (b. 1858), who married Louisa Irene Palma Di Cesnola, daughter of Civil War Medal of Honor recipient General Louis Palma di Cesnola. His other brothers included Benjamin Henry (b. 1869), George Clinton (b. 1872), and Ashley Bayeux (b. 1877). Baker spent much of his boyhood in the town of Ballston Spa, and his family discovered and purchased the property where he would build his summer studio, "The Castle", on the shores Ballston Lake.

=== Study and career ===
For four years beginning in 1876, Baker studied at the National Academy of Design, where he studied with Albert Bierstadt and Mauritz F. H. de Haas. In 1879, he won the Elliott prize during his first exhibit. In 1885, Baker won the Hallgarten Prize for his Woodland Brook.

By 1881, Baker had built a summer studio named "The Castle" (Note: The home/studio built by Baker has had multiple names over the years, including "The Castle", "Smith's Castle", and "The Haunted Castle". See Ye Olde Days by Briaddy.) on the east side of Ballston Lake in the town of Clifton Park, north of Albany, New York. The studio was designed to have excellent views of the Catskill and Berkshire Mountains, and had excellent natural lighting. The Clifton Park Historic Preservation Commission awarded "The Castle" its Historic Designation plaque, and a "Clifton Park Register of Historic Places" sign also marks the studio property. The home is now a private residence, and it is not open to the public. Baker also had a studio in the Knickerbocker Building in New York City.

=== Death ===
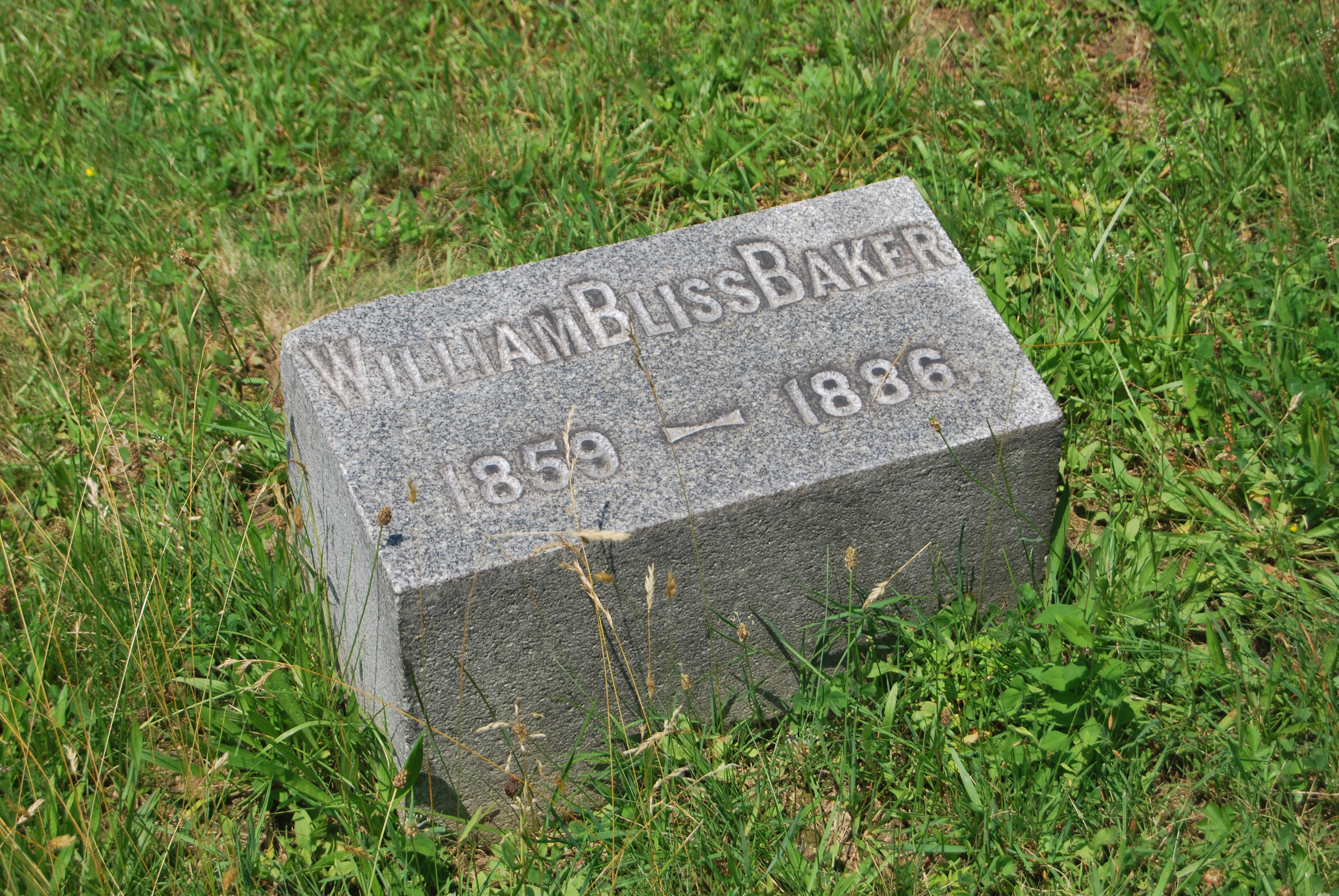
Baker's headstone in Albany Rural Cemetery in Menands, New York

Baker was just beginning to hit his stride as a landscape painter in the Realism movement when he died on November 20, 1886 at the age of 26 (Note: Regarding his death, some sources state he was in his 27th year (which means he was 26), and others state he was 27 years old. The book Art Year Book 1884: American Art gives his actual birthdate, however, so we know he was 26 when he died just a week shy of his 27th birthday.) of a cold at his father's house at Hoosick Falls, New York, after sustaining injuries while ice skating. His final completed work was Meadow Brook. Baker completed over 130 paintings during his career.

A contemporary art critic said that his death was "a distinct loss to American art". The New York Times stated that his death "deprived America of one of its most promising artists." Harper's Weekly stated that "[t]he tidings of this young artist's untimely death ... will be received with sincere regret by all those who take an intelligent interest in the growth of native American art." The New York Post wrote that "[t]he young artist was animated by an intense love of nature, which he manifested from his earliest years, and this, aided by his great industry and energy, was among the chief elements of his success in the line of art he had chosen. His untimely death will be deeply regretted by all who take an intelligent interest in American artistic progress."

He is buried in a family plot in Albany Rural Cemetery in Menands, New York (see image, right).

== Works ==
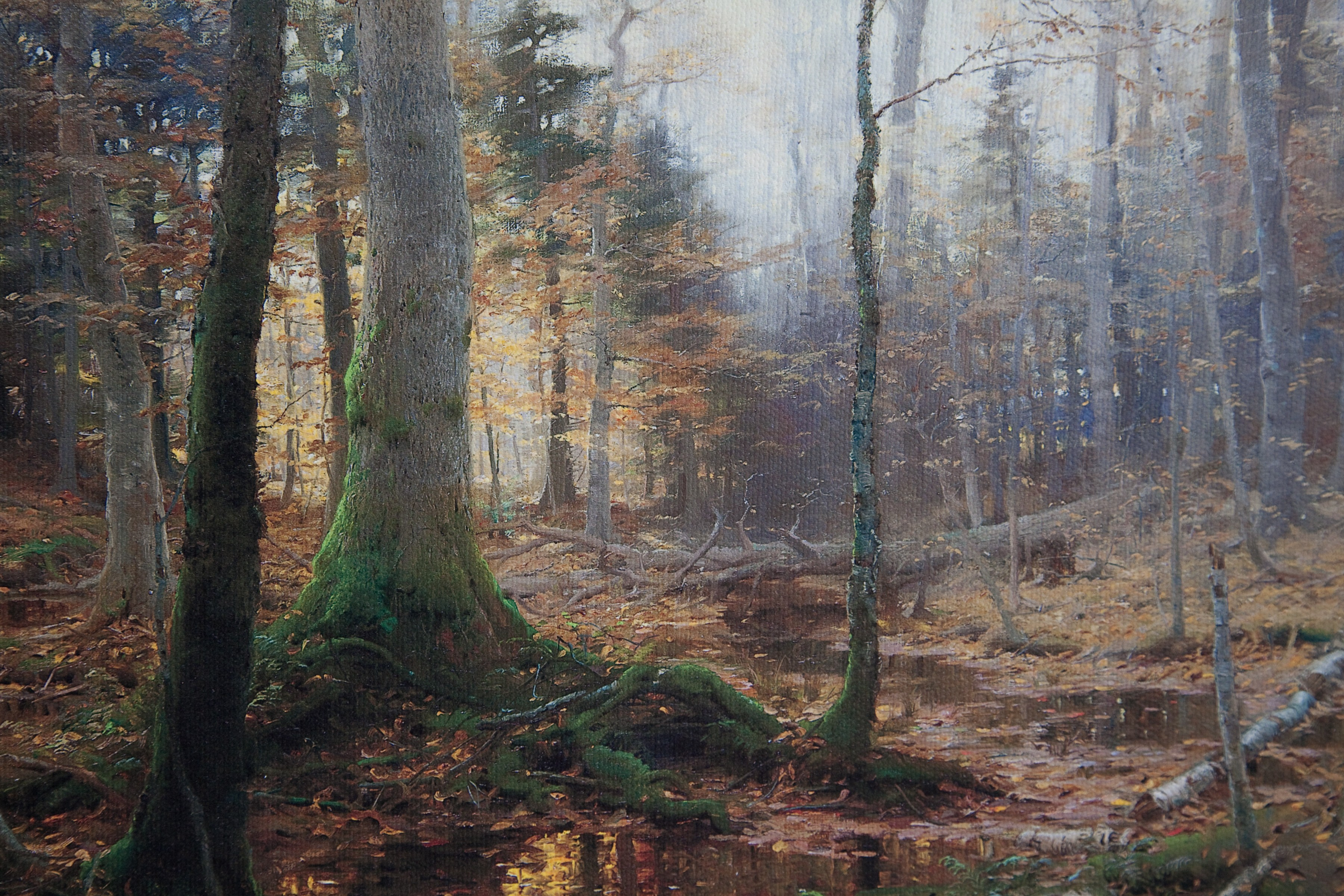
Fallen Monarchs (1886), considered Baker's masterpiece.

Baker was awarded the 1884 Third Hallgarten Prize by the National Academy of Design for A Woodland Brook.

Fallen Monarchs, considered to be Baker's masterpiece, was painted in 1886 in the Ballston Lake area. The original is owned by Brigham Young University in Provo, Utah, where it hangs in the BYU Museum of Art. A small copy of this painting hangs in the public library in the town of Ballston. His 1883 painting, A Pleasant Day at Lake George hangs in the Adirondack Museum at Blue Mountain Lake, New York.

Another of his paintings, Morning After the Snow, sold for $5,000 in 1887 (the equivalent of about $109,000 in 2006 dollars). Morning and an additional 129 of his paintings sold at that auction for a combined total of nearly $15,000 (almost $360,000 in 2010 dollars).

=== Black and white ===
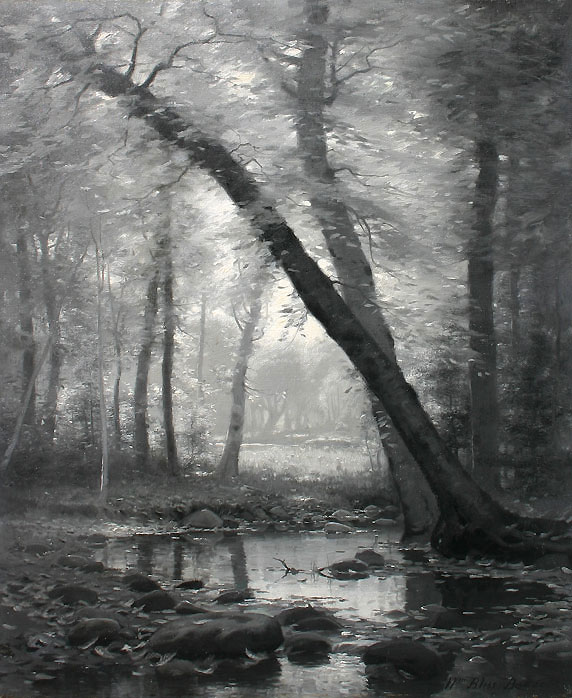
Dark Forest, a black and white oil painting completed ca.1880.

Listed alphabetically by title.

- The Brook (date unknown)
- Cattle Grazing Near a Stream Through the Pasture (date unknown)
- Dark Forest (c. 1880, 24" x 20", oil on canvas)
- Morning in the Meadows (c. 1883)
- Snow Scene (date unknown, 12 x 9 inches)
- Wood Interior (date unknown, 8 x 11 inches)
- Wood Interior (date unknown, 17.5 x 21.5 inches)

=== Color ===
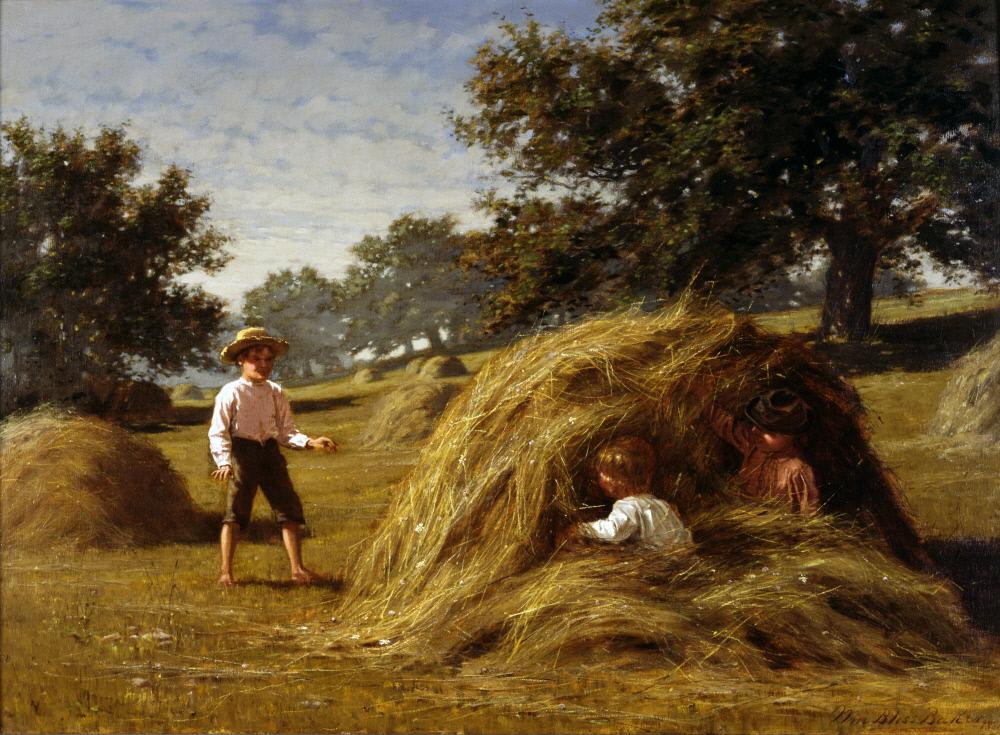
Hiding in the Haycocks, 1881

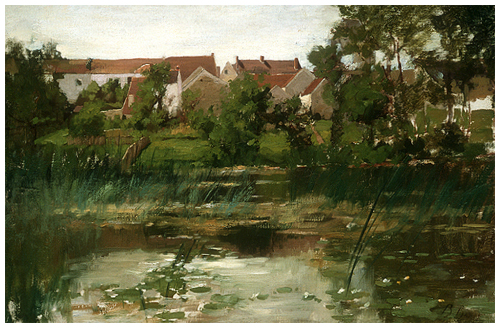
Landscape: Grez, ca. 1882

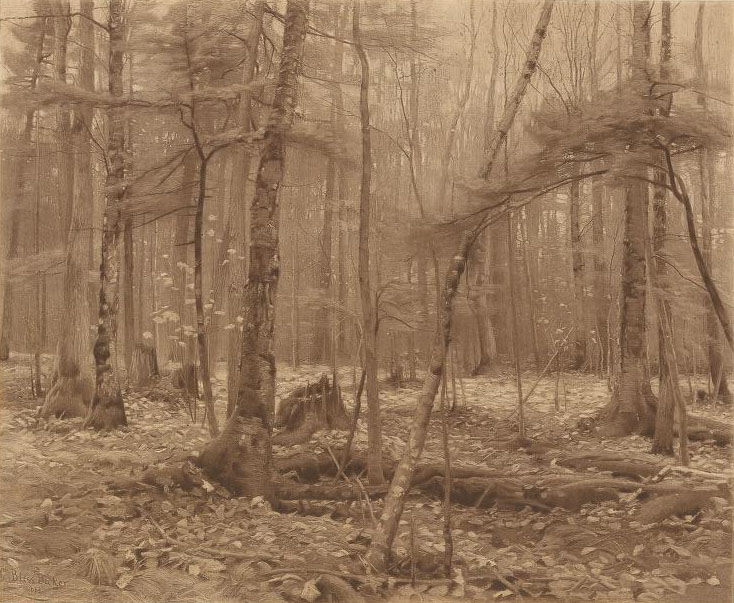
Engraving of Silence, 1883 (from Art of the World, Volume 6 (1893))

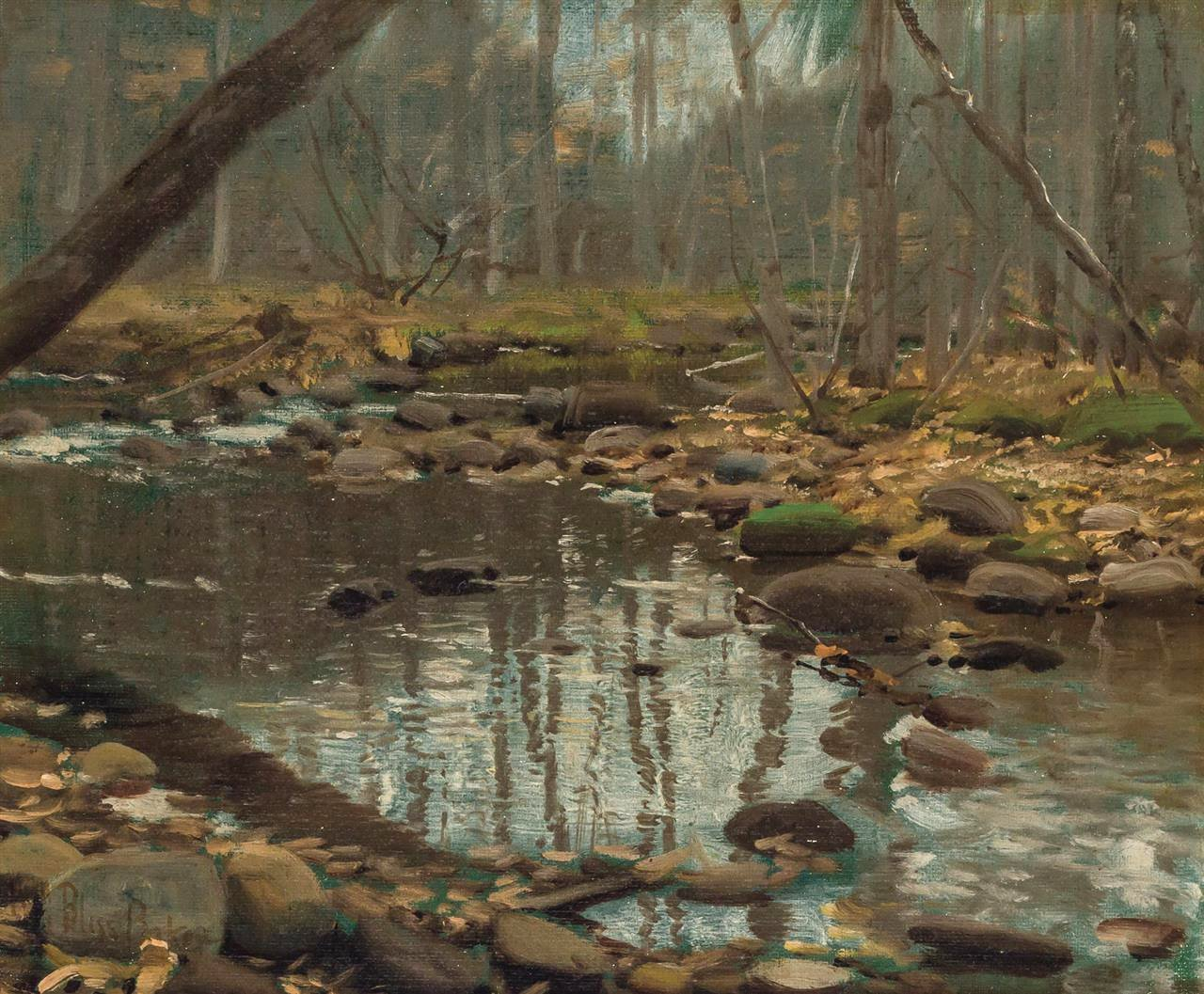
Shadows in a Pool, date unknown

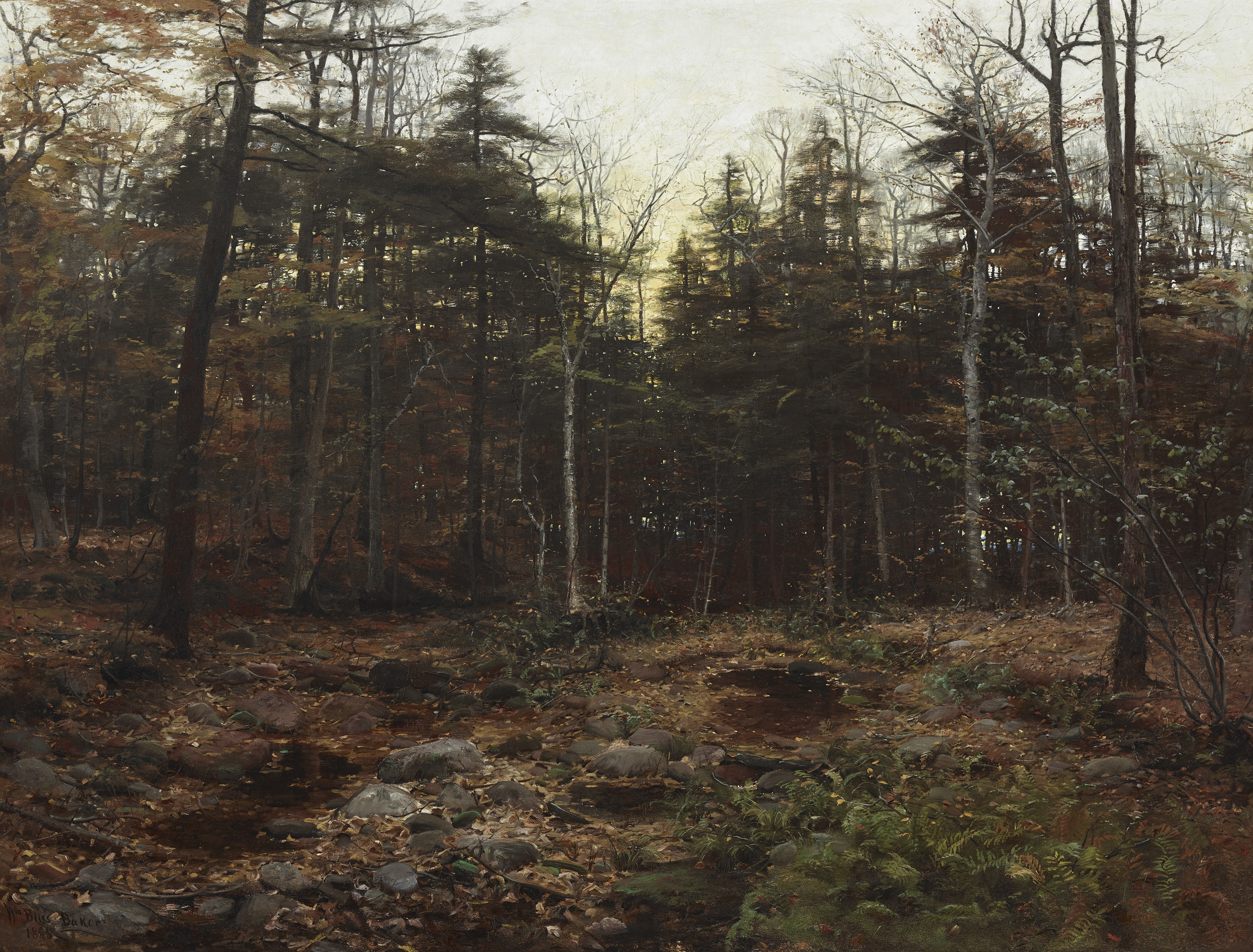
Woodland Scene, 1885

Date known
Listed alphabetically by year. Current location listed (if known).

- River View (1877)
- Deep in the Woods (1880)
- Hiding in the Haycocks (1881, housed in the Memphis Brooks Museum of Art)
- Landscape: Grez (ca.1882, housed as part of the Horace C. Henry Collection at the Henry Art Gallery at University of Washington)
- New York Harbour (1883)
- A Pleasant Day at Lake George (1883, housed in the Adirondack Experience: The Museum on Blue Mountain Lake, Blue Mountain Lake, New York)
- Silence (1883, 24 x 30 inches)
- View of New York Harbor, with Brooklyn Bridge in the Distance (1883)
- October Morning (1884)
- First Fall of Snow (1884)
- First Snow of Winter (1884)
- Summer Evening (ca.1884)
- Woodland Brook (ca.1884-1885, housed at the Montreal Museum of Fine Arts in Montréal)
- Lake Luzerne (ca.1885)
- Morning After the Snow (1885, 57 x 39 inches, housed in the Regina A. Quick Center for the Arts, St. Bonaventure University)
- Woodland Scene (1885, 38 x 50 inches, housed at the Avery Galleries, Bryn Mawr, Pennsylvania)
- Fallen Monarchs (1886, housed in the Museum of Art at Brigham Young University)
- Under the Apple Trees (1886, 36 x 24 inches)
- Meadow Brook (ca.1886, 21 x 16 inches, his last completed work)

Date unknown
Listed alphabetically by title.

- Apple Blossoms (12 x 8 inches)
- Apple Blossoms (20 x 12 inches)
- Apple Trees (12 x 20 inches)
- April Day (23.5 x 14 inches)
- April Snow (36 x 20 inches)
- Autumn (11.5 x 9.5 inches)
- Autumn Forest Landscape
- Autumn in Woods
- Autumn Leaves (12 x 20 inches)
- Autumn Study (20 x 12 inches)
- Autumn Trees by Stream
- Autumn Woods (22 x 13 inches)
- Autumn Woods (20.5 x 12 inches)
- Autumn Woods (12.5 x 8.5 inches)
- Autumn Woods (22 x 30 inches)
- Banks of Schoharie (19.5 x 18.5 inches)
- Banks of the Schoharie (14 x 10 inches)
- Bed of a Brook (12 x 19 inches)
- Bed of Brook (12 x 19 inches)
- Bed of Brook Morse Mountain, Adirondacks (12 x 17.5 inches)
- Branches of Elm (21 x 29 inches)
- Brook and Pasture (20 x 12 inches)
- Brook and Woods (12 x 20 inches)
- Catskill Clove (12 x 10 inches)
- Church Beyond a Meadow
- Clump of Trees (11.5 x 19.5 inches)
- Clover Field (12.5 x 19 inches)
- A Cool Retreat (29 x 22 inches)
- Corn Fields and Pasture (12 x 9.5 inches)
- Corn Stalks (12 x 20 inches)
- Cows Watering in a Pond
- Daisies (12 x 20 inches)
- Dead Leaves (12.5 x 19.5 inches)
- Dried Up (12 x 9.5 inches)
- Early Autumn (20 x 28 inches)
- Edge of the Creek (19 x 11.5 inches)
- Edge of the Woods (17 x 12 inches)
- An Elm (12 x 20 inches)
- Fallen (A Study) (22.5 x 13.5 inches)
- A Forest Glade (12.5 x 10 inches)
- Forest Road (12 x 20 inches)
- Forest Sunshine (12.5 x 9 inches)
- Fort Lee, Hudson River (size unknown inches)
- Gathering Chestnuts (12 x 19.5 inches)
- Golden Rod (12 x 20 inches)
- Harvest Study (12 x 8.5 inches)
- Harvest Time (12.5 x 9.5 inches)
- Haycocks (11.5 x 9 inches)
- A Haze (11.5 x 8 inches)
- In the Hayfield (12 x 9 inches)
- In the Old Pasture
- June (28 x 14 inches)
- June Pastures (12 x 19.5 inches)
- June Sunshine (22.5 x 15.5 inches)
- Landscape (14 x 22 inches)
- Landscape (19.5 x 13.5 inches)
- Landscape (22.5 x 13 inches)
- Landscape with Cattle
- Lowlands (12 x 7 inches)
- Marine
- Meadow and Woodland (12 x 10 inches)
- Mossy Stumps (12 x 10 inches)
- Mountain Top (20 x 13 inches)
- New York Harbor, City Front (19 x 7 inches)
- Old Mill Pond (12 x 20 inches)
- Opening in Woods (16 x 10 inches)
- The Old Orchard (13.5 x 22.5 inches)
- Old Stump (12 x 9.5 inches)
- Orchard in June (12 x 16 inches)
- Outlet of a Lake (19 x 13 inches)
- Pasture (20 x 12 inches)
- Pasture (18 x 14 inches)
- Pasture (12 x 10 inches)
- Pasture (12.5 x 10 inches)
- Pool and Meadow (12 x 10 inches)
- Pool and Upland (12 x 20 inches)
- Quiet Pond
- A Quiet Pond, Connecticut
- Quiet Winter Afternoon
- The Roadside (20 x 12 inches)
- Rock Study, North Shore, Lake Ontario (18 x 12 inches)
- Rocky Pool (10 x 13 inches)
- Rough Pasture (12 x 9 inches)
- Schoharie Creek (19.75 x 14 inches)
- Second Growth Timber (12.5 x 9.5 inches)
- The Sentinel (12 x 20 inches)
- Shadows in a Pool
- Shadows in the Pool (12 x 10 inches)
- Shady Pool (12 x 19 inches)
- Sheep Pasture (13 x 10.5 inches)
- Snarled Roots (18 x 11 inches)
- Snow (6.5 x 10.5 inches)
- Snow Scene (42 x 30 inches)
- Solitude (50 x 38 inches)
- Spring Pasture (12.5 x 9.25 inches)
- Standing Grass (12 x 10 inches)
- Still Pool in the Woods (19.5 x 12 inches)
- Study of Autumn Leaves (12 x 10 inches)
- Study of Ferns (12 x 10 inches)
- Study of Ferns (#2, 12 x 10 inches)
- Study of Forest (12 x 20 inches)
- Study of Rocks and Fallen Timber (18 x 12 inches)
- Study of Snow (14 x 20 inches)
- Study of Tree (11.5 x 19.5 inches)
- Study of Trees (11.5 x 18 inches)
- Study of Trees (5.5 x 12.5 inches)
- Study of Woods (10.5 x 13 inches)
- Summer Afternoon
- Summer Pasture (13 x 6.5 inches)
- Summer Woodland (12 x 10 inches)
- Sunlight in the Woods (14 x 11.5 inches)
- Sunlit Brook (12 x 19 inches)
- Sunlit Pastures (15 x 11 inches)
- Sunny Brook (19.5 x 12 inches)
- Sunrise on New York Harbor
- Sunset (12.5 x 9 inches)
- Surf (22 x 15 inches)
- Surf (22.5 x 14 inches)
- Timber Belt (20 x 12 inches)
- Tree Top (12 x 20 inches)
- Tree Trunks (12 x 20 inches)
- Tree Trunks (14 x 12 inches)
- Trees and Meadow (12 x 10 inches)
- Under the Hill (12 x 9 inches)
- Valley of Hudson from Catskills (12 x 10 inches)
- Water Fall (12 x 20 inches)
- Winter Forest (20 x 12 inches)
- Winter Twilight (12 x 9 inches)
- Wood Interior (22 x 13.5 inches)
- Wood Interior (21 x 15.5 inches)
- Wood Interior (22 x 30 inches)
- Wood Interior (21 x 29 inches)
- Wood Opening (11 x 19.5 inches)
- Wooded Glade
- Woodland Shade (12.5 x 10 inches)
- Woodland Study (12.5 x 8.5 inches)
- Woods in June (12 x 10 inches)
- Young Cattle (15.5 x 12 inches)
- Young Timber (12 x 10 inches)

== Reception and legacy ==
While Baker is relatively unknown to the general public, he was well known to art critics of the day and was considered "one of the leading landscape painters of America". He is considered to be part of the Hudson River School.

Baker "rapidly ascended to the head of his profession" by the age of 25. His landscapes were variously described as "characteristic[ally] American" and "true character studies in which varieties of vegetation and the varying influence of light and weather were identified with amazing skill." One critic in 1883 described the black and white work Morning in the Meadows as "brilliant" though perhaps too detailed.

Regarding his death, The New York Times said it "deprived America of one of its most promising artists."

== Works cited ==
- American Ancestry: Giving the Name and Descent, in the Male Line, of Americans Whose Ancestors Settled in the United States Previous to the Declaration of Independence, A. D. 1776. Albany, New York, United States: Joel Munsell's Sons. 1891.
- American Art Association (March 11, 1887). The Works of Wm. Bliss Baker, Dec'd: Finished Pictures and Studies (PDF). Messrs. Ortgies & Company., Auctioneers.
- Appleton's Annual Cyclopaedia and Register of Important Events of the Year 1886. New York, New York, United States: D. Appleton and Company. 1887.
- Briaddy, Katherine Q. (1974). Ye Olde Days: A History of Burnt Hills-Ballston Lake. Ballston Spa, New York: Journal Press.
- Clarke, Thomas Benedict (1891). Catalogue of the Thomas B. Clarke collection of American pictures: exhibition October 15 to November 28, 1891. Philadelphia, Pennsylvania: Pennsylvania Academy of the Fine Arts.
- Godel, Howard; Baumgartner, Katherine W.; Quick, Thomas, eds. (2005). An Alluring Path III. New York, New York, United States: Godel & Co. Fine Art. LCCN 2003110778.
- Jones, Agnes Halsey (1968). Hudson River School. Geneseo, New York, United States: W. F. Humphrey Press.
- Kirby, Thomas E.; Coffin, William A. (1899). Catalogue of the Private Art Collection of Thomas B. Clarke. New York, New York, United States: American Art Association.
- Sweeney, J. Gray (1982). American painting at the Tweed Museum of Art and Glensheen, the University of Minnesota, Duluth.
