= William Coffin =

William Coffin may refer to:

- William Coffin (courtier) (1495–1538), courtier at the court of King Henry VIII of England
- William Anderson Coffin (1855–1925), American landscape and figure painter
- William Coffin (diplomat) (1877–1927), American diplomat, US Consul in Jerusalem (1910–1913)
- William Haskell Coffin (1878–1941), painter and commercial artist
- William Sloane Coffin Sr. (1879–1933), American businessman
- William Sloane Coffin (1924–2006), Christian clergyman and peace activist
- Bill Coffin (born 1970), writer of novels and role-playing games
