= Francis Day (artist) =

American painter

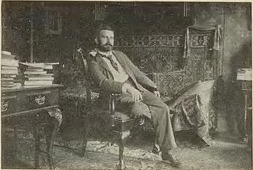
- Born: August 12, 1863
- Died: 1942 (aged 78–79)
- Occupation: Painter

James Francis Day (1863–1942), generally known as Francis Day, was an American artist. His paintings may be found in many private and public collections, largely in the United States.

He was born in LeRoy, New York and studied at New York's Art Students League and the Ecole des Beaux-Arts in Paris under Ernest Herbert and Luc-Oliver Merson. He specialized in painting family scenes.

He was a member of the Salmagundi Club, the Society of American Artists, and an associate of the National Academy of Design. He married Mary Evelyn Smith in 1887 then moved to New York City. They moved to Nutley, New Jersey in 1890 and returned to New York by 1905. About 1912 they moved to Massachusetts.

The National Academy of Design awarded him the 1895 Third Hallgarten Prize for Patience.

A number of his paintings have been offered for sale by auction in recent years, including Light of Love (Butterfields 1999), Woman with a Harp (Phillips of New York, 2000), and The Critic (Sotheby's of New York, 2004), the last named being a well-known painting, whose 'critic' is in fact a small girl listening to her mother playing the piano.
