= Valeri Larko =

American painter (born 1960)

- Born: 1960 (age 65–66); Freeport, Long Island
- Education: DuCret School of the Arts; Art Students League of New York; National Academy of Design
- Known for: Urban and industrial landscapes
- Awards: Julius Hallgarten Prize; Joyce Dutka Art Foundation Award
- Website: valerilarko.com

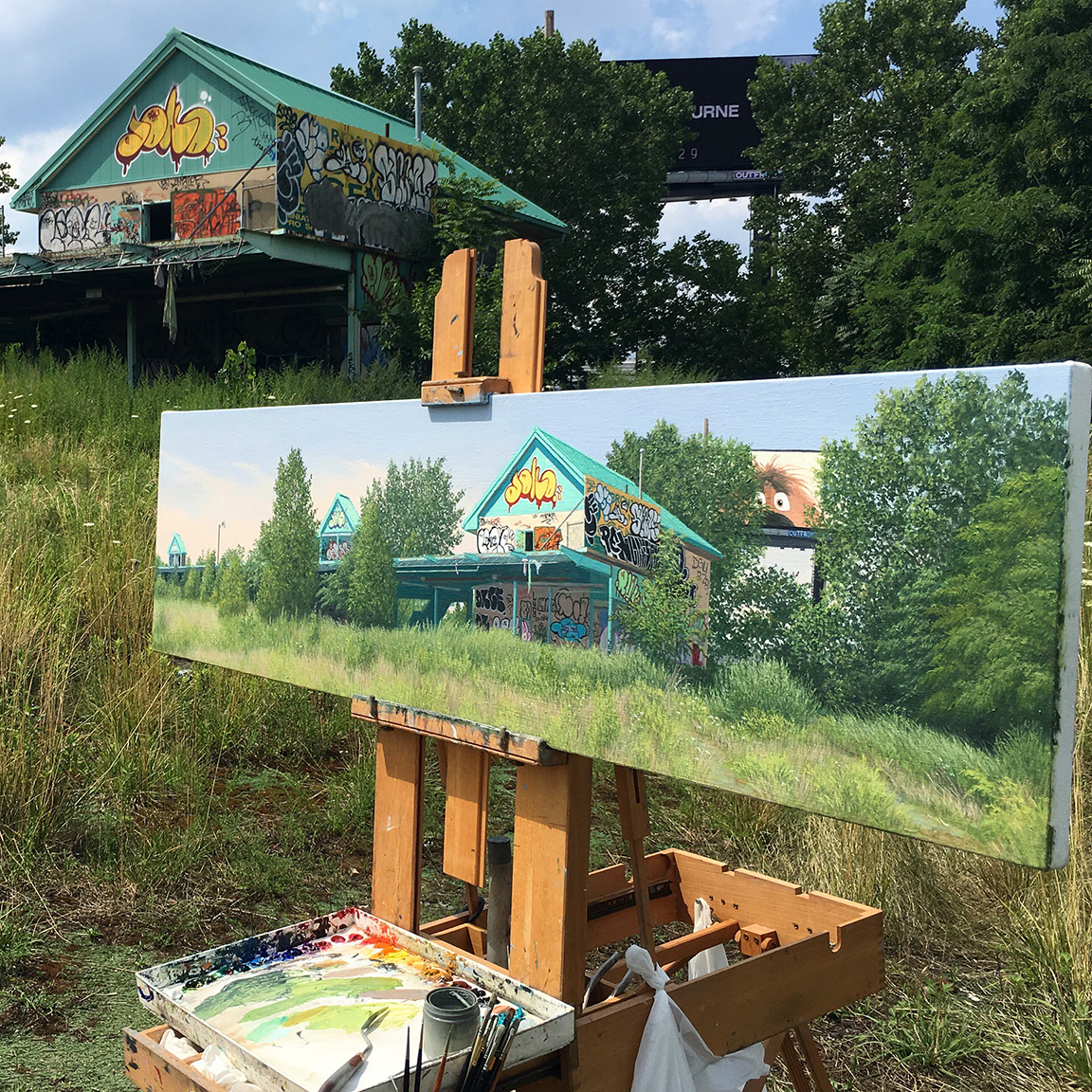
Valeri Larko. Abandoned Bronx Golf Center II, oil on linen, 15" x 58", 2016.

Valeri Larko (born 1960) is an American painter of urban and industrial landscapes. She is known for her cityscapes, painted en plein air.

== Early life, education and early career ==
Born in Freeport on Long Island, New York, Larko grew up in Parsippany, New Jersey. She trained at the DuCret School of the Arts in Plainfield, New Jersey, and at New York's Art Students League and the National Academy of Design (now the National Academy Museum and School). In 1986 she moved to Jersey City. The surrounding area's industrial parks and infrastructure, much of it rusting and derelict, changed her focus from her original pursuit as a figure painter to an interpreter of urban landscape. Moving to Summit, New Jersey, in 1989, the industrial fringes of northern New Jersey's cities remained central to Larko's work for several years until 2004, when she moved to the suburb of New Rochelle, New York. With proximity to New York City, Larko's work incorporated the urban core of the city's boroughs, including the topography, infrastructure, and abundance of graffiti-covered walls.

== Career ==
=== Art ===
Since the 1980s, Larko has created her paintings on site, setting up her easel in salvage yards, industrialized marshlands, under highways, on rooftops, and on city streets. By the early 1990s, she was painting northern New Jersey's rusted bridges, derelict gas tanks, abandoned factories, and decaying docks, in works such as 1991's "BP Port, Newark".

During the period of the late 1980s, after her move to Jersey City, Larko's paintings of industrial New Jersey began as generalized landscapes. These works eventually became more specific, close-up views within the area's industrial parks. From 1990 to 1995, she completed the Tank Series, a cycle of sixty paintings which examined the sculptural qualities of the monumental chemical tanks found in northern New Jersey.

From 1999 to 2003, Larko executed the Salvage Yard Series, working eight hours a day on location at the Kucharski Yard, an active salvage yard in Hackettstown, New Jersey, treating the salvage debris as sculpture, mass, color and texture, the deterioration lending the debris a patina. Working in oil on linen, the series comprises sixty paintings of various sizes, including monumental works of five and six feet, and smaller works on paper. In 2005, the Salvage Series was exhibited by the Arts Guild of Rahway, New Jersey, and in 2006 the Safe-T Gallery in Brooklyn mounted a solo show of the series.

After moving to New Rochelle in 2004, proximity to New York City afforded Larko an expanded view of the urban fringe. Though concentrating on the nearby borough of the Bronx, Larko also travelled to the city's more distant boroughs of Queens and Brooklyn, documenting an urban fringe which was still in use, i.e., Brooklyn's industrialized Gowanus canal, Newtown Creek at the border of Brooklyn and Queens.

In 2012, Larko began "A Bronx Block", a 20-painting cycle documenting Boone Avenue and its graffiti-laced neighborhood. The Ferris-Stahl-Meyer meat processing plant, with the consent of the company president, Guillermo O. Gonzalez, had become a magnet for graffiti artists from the Bronx and elsewhere around New York City. The Ferris-Stahl-Meyer plant was demolished in November and December 2014 to make way for the Compass Residences development, a project consisting of 1,300 apartments and 46,000 square feet of retail space. Painting on location, Larko documented Boone Avenue's graffiti covered walls. Her project attracted local residents, affording her "personal interaction with the people I meet there. While talking to people in the area, I learn a lot about the sites that I am painting." Prominent New York graffiti artists who have contributed to the art on the Ferris-Stahl-Meyer building's walls, have recognized their images in Larko's paintings.

Larko's graffiti-laced paintings, apart from the Bronx Block series, were part of the Bronx Museum of the Arts year-long exhibition of summer 2012 to summer 2013, "Bronx Lab: Style Wars".

With the conclusion of the "Bronx Block" series, Larko resumed her focus on New York's broader urban fringe, finding subjects in its boroughs and in its greater metropolitan area, including new imagery from her original point of reference, industrial New Jersey. She also depicted signs of urban sprawl such as fast food restaurants, gas stations, webs of utility wires, and the spread of expressways.

=== Exhibitions, public commissions and collections ===
Larko has exhibited continually since 1991 in the New York-New Jersey area as well as elsewhere in the United States and abroad. Exhibitions include, “Bronx Focus: Paintings by Valeri Larko” at the Bronx Museum which featured forty urban landscapes spanning ten years, 2005–2015, all of which the artist painted on location in the Bronx and “Location, Location, Location”, a solo exhibition at the Hampden Gallery, UMass Amherst, both in 2016. In 2015 the artist had a solo exhibitions at the Carol Schlosberg Gallery, Montserrat College of Art.

A twenty-two year mid career survey exhibition, "Valeri Larko: Two Decades", was on view at the Morris Museum in 2010, and solo shows at the Bronx River Arts Center, the Bronx Borough President's Art Gallery, the Hunterdon Art Museum, College of New Rochelle, the New Jersey State Museum, Union County College, the Johnson & Johnson Gallery at the company's corporate headquarters in New Brunswick. She has been featured in several group exhibitions, including shows at the Butler Museum of American Art, the Fleming Museum, Jersey City Museum, Katonah Museum of Art, Rutgers University, William Paterson University, the National Academy of Sciences, Aljira Center for Contemporary Art, and in the Art in Embassies Program in Minsk, Belarus.

In 2000, Larko was one of two artists awarded a commission by the New Jersey State Council on the Arts and New Jersey Transit to create murals for the Secaucus Transfer Station, a major rail transit hub in northern New Jersey, and the largest train station in the state. The facility opened in 2003, with Larko's four murals occupying the North Mezzanine. Choosing "Four Corners" as her theme, the oil on stretched linen murals depict "four railroad bridges with historically appropriate trains from the four corners"[17] of northern New Jersey. The four murals are: "Jersey City" and "Brielle", both measuring 5 ft 5 in (1.65 m) by 27 ft 5 in (8.36 m), and "Delaware Water Gap" and West Trenton,” each measuring 5 ft 5 in (1.65 m) by 6 ft 8 in (2.03 m).

In addition to exhibitions, Larko's works are in many private collections in the United States and abroad. Her paintings are also represented in several public collections including the Jersey City Museum, the Montclair Art Museum, the New Jersey State Museum, Rutgers University, the Summit City Hall, and in the corporate collections of Johnson & Johnson, Fox Industries, MacArthur Petroleum, IMTT, and Cooper Alloy.

=== Awards ===
Larko has been the recipient of several awards. She twice won the National Academy of Design's annual Hallgarten Prize, in 1988 and 1992. She has been awarded a painting fellowship by the New Jersey State Council on the Arts, the Newark Museum's Artist in Residence Fellowship, and a residency fellowship at the Vermont Studio Center, Johnson VT. In 2006, Larko was awarded a Strategic Opportunity Grant issued jointly by the New York State Council on the Arts and the New York Foundation for the Arts, as well as a George Sugarman Foundation Grant for painting. In 2009, Larko was honored with the Joyce Dutka Art Foundation Award for painting.

=== Teaching, curatorial and special projects ===
As a teacher, Larko has been a member of the faculty of the Visual Art Center of New Jersey in Summit since 1993, where she teaches Landscape Painting. Larko has a private teaching practice since 1999, and instructs classes in Europe and the northeastern United States. Larko served as Gallery Director of the Tomasulo Art Gallery at Union County College, Cranford, New Jersey, from 1996 to 2010. Larko also served as the curator for the majority of the gallery's exhibitions, and worked with guest curators for special projects.

In 2014, Larko and artist Laura James co-founded BX200, the Bronx Visual Artist Directory, a curated, online database of two-hundred artists identified with the Bronx.
