= List of Hallgarten Prize–winning painters =

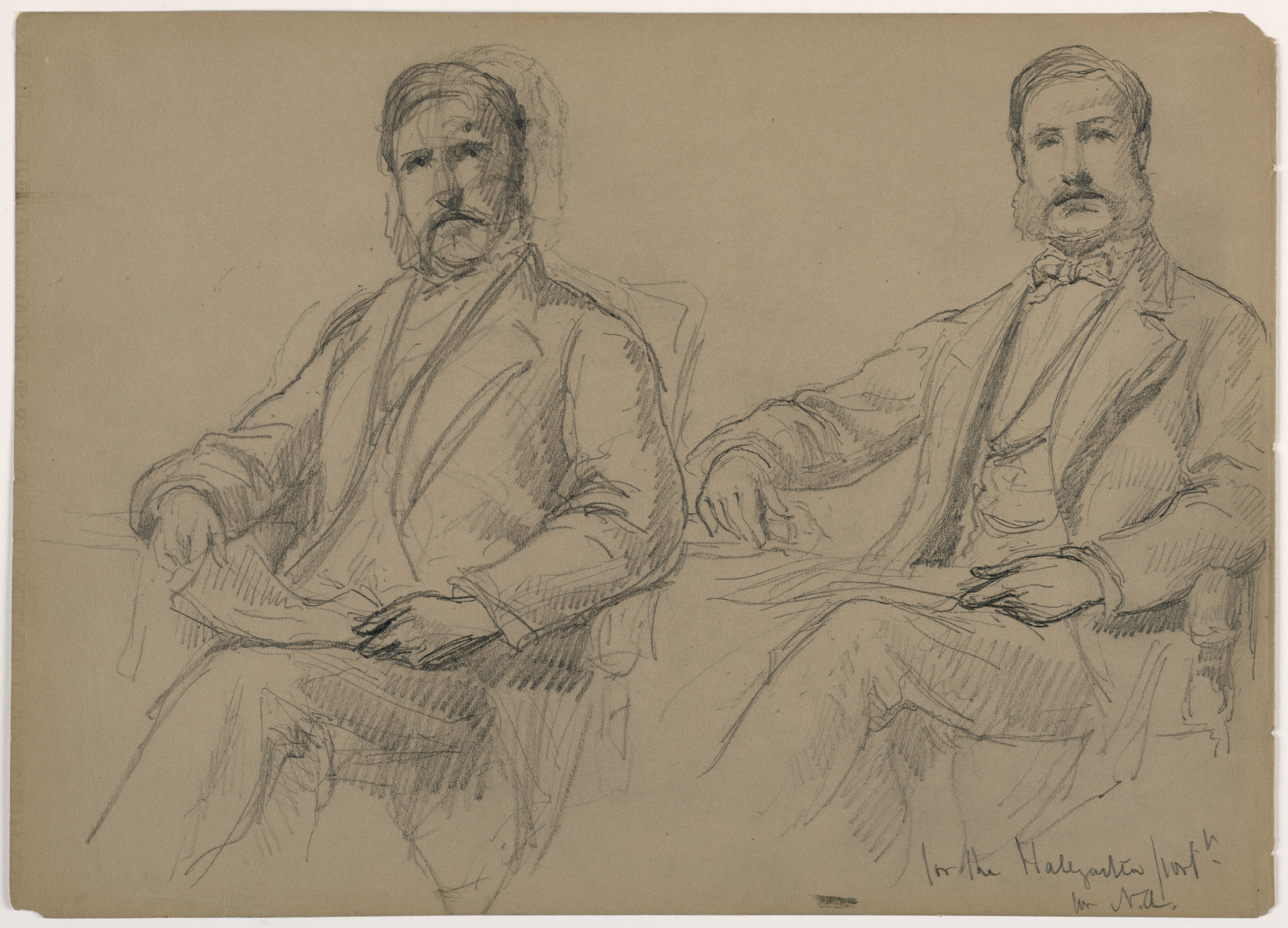
Two Studies of Julius Hallgarten (1884) by Daniel Huntington, Cooper Hewitt Museum

The Julius Hallgarten Prizes (defunct) were a trio of prestigious art prizes awarded by the National Academy of Design from 1884 to 2008. They recognized outstanding works exhibited in NAD's Annual Exhibition by American painters under age 35. A prize was awarded in each of three classes—the First Hallgarten for the best oil painting by a young artist in the annual exhibition, the Second Hallgarten for the second-best, and the Third Hallgarten for the third-best. The winners were chosen by a vote of all the artists participating in each year's exhibition, and the prizes were accompanied by a cash award.

Winning a Hallgarten could give a tremendous boost to the career of a young painter. The prizes were held in especially high regard because the winners were selected by one's fellow artists.

The National Academy of Design's annual exhibitions became biennial in 2002. The last Hallgarten Prizes were awarded in 2008.

== Julius Hallgarten ==
The prizes were established through a $12,000 endowment created in 1883 by stockbroker Julius Hallgarten (1840–1884).

The late Mr. JULIUS HALLGARTEN, of New York, endowed prizes of three hundred, two hundred and one hundred dollars, to be awarded respectively to the painters of the best three pictures in oil colors exhibited at each Annual Exhibition, under the following conditions:
"All works will be considered to be in competition which have been painted in the United States by an American citizen under thirty-five years of age, and which have not before been publicly exhibited in the City or vicinity of New York. No competitor may take two prizes, or a prize of the same class a second time.
"The awards will be made by vote by ballot of all the Exhibitors of the season … Each artist will be entitled to one vote at each ballot, specifying his choice for each one of the three prizes, and each prize will be awarded to the painting receiving the highest number of votes for the prize, but no work will be entitled to the prize unless at least fifty of the exhibitors vote at the ballot, and the work receive one-third of all the votes cast."

=== Other Hallgarten Prizes ===
Julius Hallgarten also created an endowment of $5,000 for the National Academy of Design School of Art. Student winners of the Julius Hallgarten School Prize and Alfred N. Hallgarten Traveling Scholarship do not belong on this list.

== Painters and works ==
=== 1884–1929 ===
Year Exhibition	Class	Artist	Work	Image	Current location	Notes
1884; 59th	First	Louis Moeller	Puzzled			
1884; 59th	Second	Charles Yardley Turner	The Courtship of Miles Standish			
1884; 59th	Third	William Bliss Baker	Woodland Brook—Decline of an Autumn Day		Montreal Museum of Fine Arts, Montreal, Quebec	
1885; 60th	First	Harry Chase	New York Harbor—North River		Katzen Arts Center, American University, Washington D.C	Ex collection: Corcoran Gallery of Art
1885; 60th	Second	John Francis Murphy	Tints of a Vanished Past			
1885; 60th	Third	Dennis Miller Bunker	A Bohemian		de Young Museum, San Francisco, California	
1886; 61st	First	Edward Percy Moran	Divided Attention			
1886; 61st	Second	William Anderson Coffin	Moonlight in Harvest			
1886; 61st	Third	Irving Ramsay Wiles	The Corner Table			Auctioned at Christie's NY, 4 December 2003, Lot 33.
1887; 62nd	First	Alfred Kappes	Buckwheat Cakes			Kappes was later disqualified because he was over age 35.
1887; 62nd	Second	Walter Launt Palmer	January			
1887; 62nd	Third	Dwight William Tryon	Landscape: A Lighted Village		Freer Gallery of Art, Washington, D.C.	Tryon was later disqualified because he was over age 35.
1888; 63rd	First	George de Forest Brush	The Sculptor and the King		Portland Art Museum, Portland, Oregon	
1888; 63rd	Second	Henry Rankin Poore	Foxhounds			
1888; 63rd	Third	Charles Courtney Curran	A Breezy Day		Pennsylvania Academy of the Fine Arts, Philadelphia, Pennsylvania	
1889; 64th	First	Robert Van Vorst Sewell	Sea Urchins			
1889; 64th	Second	Kenyon Cox	November			
1889; 64th	Third	Frank Weston Benson	Orpheus			
1890; 65th	First	No award				"Although the triple prize the National Academy of Design has inherited from the late Julius Hallgarten was not awarded in 1890, neither in 1891, nor in 1892, hope ever springs in the breasts of exhibitors at the annual show that they will be awarded after to-day."
1890; 65th	Second	No award				"Although the triple prize the National Academy of Design has inherited from the late Julius Hallgarten was not awarded in 1890, neither in 1891, nor in 1892, hope ever springs in the breasts of exhibitors at the annual show that they will be awarded after to-day."
1890; 65th	Third	No award				"Although the triple prize the National Academy of Design has inherited from the late Julius Hallgarten was not awarded in 1890, neither in 1891, nor in 1892, hope ever springs in the breasts of exhibitors at the annual show that they will be awarded after to-day."
1891; 66th	First	No award				"Although the triple prize the National Academy of Design has inherited from the late Julius Hallgarten was not awarded in 1890, neither in 1891, nor in 1892, hope ever springs in the breasts of exhibitors at the annual show that they will be awarded after to-day."
1891; 66th	Second	No award				"Although the triple prize the National Academy of Design has inherited from the late Julius Hallgarten was not awarded in 1890, neither in 1891, nor in 1892, hope ever springs in the breasts of exhibitors at the annual show that they will be awarded after to-day."
1891; 66th	Third	No award				"Although the triple prize the National Academy of Design has inherited from the late Julius Hallgarten was not awarded in 1890, neither in 1891, nor in 1892, hope ever springs in the breasts of exhibitors at the annual show that they will be awarded after to-day."
1892; 67th	First	No award				"Although the triple prize the National Academy of Design has inherited from the late Julius Hallgarten was not awarded in 1890, neither in 1891, nor in 1892, hope ever springs in the breasts of exhibitors at the annual show that they will be awarded after to-day."
1892; 67th	Second	No award				"Although the triple prize the National Academy of Design has inherited from the late Julius Hallgarten was not awarded in 1890, neither in 1891, nor in 1892, hope ever springs in the breasts of exhibitors at the annual show that they will be awarded after to-day."
1892; 67th	Third	No award				"Although the triple prize the National Academy of Design has inherited from the late Julius Hallgarten was not awarded in 1890, neither in 1891, nor in 1892, hope ever springs in the breasts of exhibitors at the annual show that they will be awarded after to-day."
1893; 68th	First	Charles Morgan McIlhenny	Gray Morning			
1893; 68th	Second	Edward August Bell	The Five Dreamers			
1893; 68th	Third	Henry Prellwitz	The Prodigal Son			
1894; 69th	First	Edmund Tarbell	An Arrangement in Pink and Grey (Afternoon Tea)		Worcester Art Museum, Worcester, Massachusetts	
1894; 69th	Second	Edith Mitchill	Hagar and Ishmael			Mitchill and Murphy were the first two women awarded Hallgarten Prizes.
1894; 69th	Third	Ada Clifford Murphy	That Difficult World			Mitchill and Murphy were the first two women awarded Hallgarten Prizes.
1895; 70th	First	George Randolph Barse	A Tribute to Satyr			
1895; 70th	Second	Charles Courtney Curran	The Enchanted Shore			
1895; 70th	Third	Francis Day	Patience			
1896; 71st	First	Mary Brewster Hazelton	In a Studio			Hazelton was the first woman awarded a First Hallgarten; Prize.
1896; 71st	Second	John Henry Hatfield	After the Bath			
1896; 71st	Third	Louise Howland King Cox	Pomona			
1897; 72nd	First	Wilbur Aaron Reaser	Mother and Child			
1897; 72nd	Second	Leo Moeller	A Patriot at Valley Forge			
1897; 72nd	Third	Charles Edward Proctor	Grandpa			
1898; 73rd	First	Robert Reid	Dawn			
1898; 73rd	Second	Harry Roseland	An Important Letter			
1898; 73rd	Third	Walter C. Hartshorn	The Keepsake			
1899; 74th	First	George Henry Bogert	September Evening		Metropolitan Museum of Art, New York City	
1899; 74th	Second	Louis Paul Dessar	Portrait: Mrs. Ruthrauff			
1899; 74th	Third	Carle John Blenner	The Letter			
1900; 75th	First	Louis Paul Dessar	Landscape with Sheep			
1900; 75th	Second	E. Irving Couse	Along the Quay			
1900; 75th	Third	Walter Granville-Smith	The Light of the House			
1901; 76th	First	Walter Elmer Schofield	Winter Evening		Muriel and Philip Berman Museum of Art, Ursinus College, Collegeville, Pennsylvania	
1901; 76th	Second	Clara Taggart MacChesney	A Good Story: Portrait of Robert Loftin Newman		Smithsonian American Art Museum, Washington, D.C.	
1901; 76th	Third	Matilda Browne	Repose			
1902; 77th	First	E. Irving Couse	The Peace Pipe		Metropolitan Museum of Art, New York City	
1902; 77th	Second	Louis Loeb	The Mother			
1902; 77th	Third	Will Howe Foote	The Blue Vase			
1903; 78th	First	Harry Mills Walcott	At the Party			
1903; 78th	Second	William Fair Kline	Leda and the Swan			
1903; 78th	Third	Belle Havens	The Last Load			
1904; 79th	First	Charles Webster Hawthorne	Girl in Green		University of Kentucky Art Museum, Lexington, Kentucky	
1904; 79th	Second	Louise Howland King Cox	The Sisters			
1904; 79th	Third	Samuel Johnson Woolf	Finale			
1905; 80th	First	F. Luis Mora	The Letter			
1905; 80th	Second	Gustave Adolph Wiegand	Moonrise, Early Spring		Brooklyn Museum, Brooklyn, New York City	
1905; 80th	Third	Martin Petersen	Curiosity Seekers			
1906; 81st	First	No award				Dewitt M. Lockman was initially awarded the First; Hallgarten for Partiality, but the artist was disqualified because he was over age 35.
1906; 81st	Second	Charles Webster Hawthorne	Still Life		Swope Art Museum, Terra Haute, Indiana	
1906; 81st	Third	Clark Voorhees	Spring Afternoon			
1907; 82nd	First	William Cotton	The Princess			
1907; 82nd	Second	Hugo Ballin	The Three Ages			
1907; 82nd	Third	Eleanor C. A. Winslow	The Necklace			
1908; 83rd	First	Ernest Lawson	Ice on the Hudson			
1908; 83rd	Second	George Wesley Bellows	North River		Pennsylvania Academy of the Fine Arts, Philadelphia, Pennsylvania	
1908; 83rd	Third	William Wallace Gilchrist Jr.	Daughter and Doll			
1909; 84th	First	Daniel Garber	Horses			
1909; 84th	Second	Charles Bittinger	After the Ball			
1909; 84th	Third	Ben Ali Haggin	Elfrida			
1910; 85th	First	Gifford Beal	The Palisades			
1910; 85th	Second	Louis David Vaillant	Woodland Play			
1910; 85th	Third	Charles Rosen	Summer Breeze		Bill Memorial Library, Groton, Connecticut	
1911; 86th	First	Lillian Genth	Depths of the Woods		Smithsonian American Art Museum, Washington, D.C.	
1911; 86th	Second	Joseph Thurman Pearson Jr.	A Group of Geese			
1911; 86th	Third	Leslie Prince Thompson	Tea			
1912; 87th	First	Charles Rosen	A Rocky Ledge			Ex collection: Flint Institute of Arts, Flint, Michigan
1912; 87th	Second	Everett Warner	Along the River Front		Toledo Museum of Art, Toledo, Ohio	
1912; 87th	Third	Eliot Candee Clark	Under the Trees			
1913; 88th	First	George Wesley Bellows	Little Girl in White (Queenie Burnett)		National Gallery of Art, Washington, D.C.	
1913; 88th	Second	Robert Spencer	The Silk Mill			
1913; 88th	Third	M. Jean McLane	Brother and Sister: Portrait of Virginia and Stanton Arnold			
1914; 89th	First	Jonas Lie	Afterglow		Art Institute of Chicago, Chicago, Illinois	
1914; 89th	Second	Rae Sloan Bredin	Midsummer			
1914; 89th	Third	Eugene Speicher	Portrait of John Nelson Cole, Jr.			
1915; 90th	First	Eugene Speicher	Betalo			
1915; 90th	Second	Randall Davey	Portrait of a Young Lady: Mildred Cowing		Art Institute of Chicago, Chicago, Illinois	
1915; 90th	Third	Robert H. Nisbet	Lingering Summer			
1916; 91st	First	Arthur Crisp	The Strollers			
1916; 91st	Second	Christine Herter Kendall	Study of Light and Shadow			
1916; 91st	Third	John Fulton Folinsbee	Winter Quiet			
1917; 92nd	First	Howard Everett Smith	Portrait of Bela Pratt			
1917; 92nd	Second	John Fulton Folinsbee	Canal in Winter		National Arts Club, New York City	
1917; 92nd	Third	Sidney Edward Dickinson	Unrest			
1918; 93rd	First	Leopold Seyffert	Lacquer Screen		Pennsylvania Academy of the Fine Arts, Philadelphia, Pennsylvania	
1918; 93rd	Second	Lazar Raditz	Self-Portrait		Pennsylvania Academy of the Fine Arts, Philadelphia, Pennsylvania	
1918; 93rd	Third	Felix Russmann	The Black Bottle			
1919; 94th	First	Robert Strong Woodward	Between the Setting Sun and Rising Moon			Purchased by a Hallgarten family member, for $500.
1919; 94th	Second	Ercole Cartotto	Portrait of Miss Marion Ryder			
1919; 94th	Third	Dines Carlsen	The Jade Bowl			
1920; 95th	First	Armin Carl Hansen	A Boy with a Cod		Los Angeles County Museum of Art, Los Angeles, California	
1920; 95th	Second	Kentaro Kato	Portrait of a Young Woman			
1920; 95th	Third	John E. Costigan	Group			
1921; 96th	First	Ross Moffett	The Old Fisherman			
1921; 96th	Second	Felicie Waldo Howell	October			
1921; 96th	Third	William Auerbach-Levy	Portrait of Michael Brennen			
1922; 97th	First	Aldro Hibbard	Late February			
1922; 97th	Second	Robert Philipp	Portrait of Himself (Self-Portrait)			
1922; 97th	Third	Louis Ritman	Sunlit Window		Indianapolis Museum of Art, Indianapolis, Indiana	
1923; 98th	First	John Fulton Folinsbee	By the Upper Lock		Smithsonian American Art Museum, Washington, D.C.	
1923; 98th	Second	Dines Carlsen	The Flemish Tapestry			
1923; 98th	Third	Fred Nagler	A Naturalist			
1924; 99th	First	Sidney Edward Dickinson	Amy			
1924; 99th	Second	Douglass Ewell Parshall	The Great Surge			
1924; 99th	Third	Dorothy Ochtman	An Old Brass Kettle			
1925; 100th	First	Clarence Raymond Johnson	Lumberville Lock			
1925; 100th	Second	Stanley W. Woodward	Mid-Ocean			
1925; 100th	Third	Jerry Farnsworth	Helen			
1926; 101st	First	Jes Wilhelm Schlaikjer	The Pink Cameo			
1926; 101st	Second	Jay Hall Connaway	The Giant			
1926; 101st	Third	Carl W. Peters	View from a Window			
1927; 102nd	First	Antonio Pietro Martino	Winter		Woodmere Art Museum, Chestnut Hill, Philadelphia, Pennsylvania	
1927; 102nd	Second	Douglas Ewell Parshall	The Red Sail			
1927; 102nd	Third	Jerry Farnsworth	Joaquin's Boys			
1928; 103rd	First	Carl Lawless	In the Mountains			
1928; 103rd	Second	Carl W. Peters	Around the Bend			
1928; 103rd	Third	George Byron Browne	Old Iron, Copper, Etc.		Destroyed by the artist.	First African-American to win a Hallgarten Prize. NAD's website erroneously lists George Elmer Browne as the winner.
1929; 104th	First	Ethel "Polly" Thayer Starr	Circles			
1929; 104th	Second	Arthur Hill Gilbert	Old Oak, Monterey			
1929; 104th	Third	Malcolm Humphreys	Fishing Fleet			

=== 1930–1969 ===
Year Exhibition	Class	Artist	Work	Image	Current location	Notes
1930; 105th	First	Francis Wayland Speight	The Day's Work Done			
1930; 105th	Second	Francis Chapin	Cedarburg, Saturday Afternoon			
1930; 105th	Third	Henry Hensche	Tea Time			
1931; 106th	First	Paul Trebilcock	Two Women			
1931; 106th	Second	Paul Sample	Dairy Ranch			
1931; 106th	Third	Carl Woolsey	Winter Moonlight			
1932; 107th	First	No award				
1932; 107th	Second	Jes Wilhelm Schlaikjer	The Little Ones			
1932; 107th	Third	Carl W. Peters	Barnyard			
1933; 108th	First	William Newport Goodell	Pastoral			
1933; 108th	Second	Catherine Morris Wright	Before the Party			
1933; 108th	Third	Junius Allen	Guinea Docks: Gloucester			
1934; 109th	First	Ruth Wilcox	Bonnets			
1934; 109th	Second	Cathol O'Toole	Interior of the Metropolitan			
1934; 109th	Third	Joseph Hirsch	Masseur Tom		Clay Center for the Arts and Sciences, Charleston, West Virginia	
1935; 110th	First	Cathol O'Toole	Conglomeration			
1935; 110th	Second	Ferdinand E. Warren	Montauk Lighthouse on Turtle Hill			
1935; 110th	Third	Keith Shaw Williams	The Red Print			
1936; 111th	First	Maurice Blumenfeld	Refreshments			Blumenfeld was the youngest person ever awarded a Hallgarten Prize. He was 17, and had studied for only four months at the Art Students League of New York.
1936; 111th	Second	Harold Black	Express Track			
1936; 111th	Third	Nan Greacen	Some Things on a Table			
1937; 112th	First	Antonio Pietro Martino	Cathedral			
1937; 112th	Second	Maurice Abramson	Still Life			
1937; 112th	Third	Tosca Olinsky	Flowers			
1938; 113th	First	Clyde Singer	Barn Dance			
1938; 113th	Second	Ogden Pleissner	South Pass City (Wyoming Ghost Town)			
1938; 113th	Third	Robert Edward Weaver	Wagon 97			
1939		No awards				No Annual Exhibition due to the 1939 New York World's Fair
1940; 114th	First	Verona Burkhard	Kinzer's Place			
1940; 114th	Second	Nicholas U. Comito	Fig Leaves and Fruit			
1940; 114th	Third	Soss Melik	His Library			
1941; 115th	First	Stokely Webster	In the Park			
1941; 115th	Second	Henrik Mayer	Halloween Carnival			
1941; 115th	Third	Paul C. Burns	Suburban Mail			
1942; 116th	First	Hananiah Harari	Man's Boudoir			
1942; 116th	Second	Seymour Fox	Fish House: Interior			
1942; 116th	Third	Stephen McNeeley	Girl Writing			
1943; 117th	First	Greta Matson	Pat			
1943; 117th	Second	Henry Martin Gasser	Rocky Neck or Frog Hollow			Gasser exhibited 2 paintings, but Falk does not specify which won the Second Hallgarten.
1943; 117th	Third	Tosca Olinsky	Still Life			
1944; 118th	First	Louis di Valentin	Ladies Invited			
1944; 118th	Second	Peter G. Cook	Weeds and Corn			
1944; 118th	Third	Paul Lewis Clemens	Ruth with Cat			
March 1945; 119th	First	No award				"As it developed, the three Hallgarten prizes, allocable to artists under 35, were omitted 'because of the war and lack of competition'." Following severe criticism, NAD mounted a second Annual; Exhibition in December 1945.
March 1945; 119th	Second	No award				"As it developed, the three Hallgarten prizes, allocable to artists under 35, were omitted 'because of the war and lack of competition'." Following severe criticism, NAD mounted a second Annual; Exhibition in December 1945.
March 1945; 119th	Third	No award				"As it developed, the three Hallgarten prizes, allocable to artists under 35, were omitted 'because of the war and lack of competition'." Following severe criticism, NAD mounted a second Annual; Exhibition in December 1945.
December 1945; 120th	First	Priscilla W. Roberts	The Unmade Bed			
December 1945; 120th	Second	John Pike	Village Green			
December 1945; 120th	Third	Rudolph Pen	Summer Landscape			
1946; 121st	First	No award				"For lack of suitable objects a total of $1,075 was withheld this year in the form of three Hallgarten Prizes for artists under thirty-five, the Truman Prize for a landscapist in the same age bracket, and the Palmer Memorial Prize for best marine."
1946; 121st	Second	No award				"For lack of suitable objects a total of $1,075 was withheld this year in the form of three Hallgarten Prizes for artists under thirty-five, the Truman Prize for a landscapist in the same age bracket, and the Palmer Memorial Prize for best marine."
1946; 121st	Third	No award				"For lack of suitable objects a total of $1,075 was withheld this year in the form of three Hallgarten Prizes for artists under thirty-five, the Truman Prize for a landscapist in the same age bracket, and the Palmer Memorial Prize for best marine."
1947; 122nd	First	No award				"The three Julius Hallgarten Prizes, the S. J. Wallace; Truman Prize and the Edwin Palmer Memorial Prize were not awarded."
1947; 122nd	Second	No award				"The three Julius Hallgarten Prizes, the S. J. Wallace; Truman Prize and the Edwin Palmer Memorial Prize were not awarded."
1947; 122nd	Third	No award				"The three Julius Hallgarten Prizes, the S. J. Wallace; Truman Prize and the Edwin Palmer Memorial Prize were not awarded."
1948; 123rd	First	Martin Jackson	Tintype			
1948; 123rd	Second	Jacob Arkush	Leona			
1948; 123rd	Third	Ruth Ray	Navajo Land			
1949; 124th	First	Priscilla W. Roberts	Bird and Rose			
1949; 124th	Second	Gigi Ford Pucci	Clotheslines			
1949; 124th	Third	John P. Wheat	Road to Golgotha			
1950; 125th	First	Sperry Andrews	Ballet Dancer			
1950; 125th	Second	Richard Bové	New York Scene			
1950; 125th	Third	Joseph L. Lasker	Phoenix			
1951; 126th	First	Ethel Magafan				
1951; 126th	Second	Will Lamm				
1951; 126th	Third	Leonard?				
1952; 127th	First					
1952; 127th	Second					
1952; 127th	Third					
1953; 128th	First					
1953; 128th	Second					
1953; 128th	Third	Jules Kirschenbaum				
1954; 129th	First	Paul W. Zimmerman				
1954; 129th	Second					
1954; 129th	Third	Keith Finch				
1955; 130th	First	Joseph L. Lasker				
1955; 130th	Second	Glenn Bradshaw				
1955; 130th	Third					
1956; 131st	First					
1956; 131st	Second					
1956; 131st	Third					
1957; 132nd	First					Colleen Browning, won one of the 1957 prizes
1957; 132nd	Second					
1957; 132nd	Third					
1958; 133rd	First					
1958; 133rd	Second					
1958; 133rd	Third					
1959; 134th	First					
1959; 134th	Second					
1959; 134th	Third					
1960; 135th	First					David Levine won one of 1960 prizes
1960; 135th	Second					
1960; 135th	Third					
1961; 136th	First					Paul Resika won one of the 1961 prizes
1961; 136th	Second					
1961; 136th	Third					
1962; 137th	First					Bruce Dorfman won one of the 1962 prizes
1962; 137th	Second					
1962; 137th	Third					
1963; 138th	First					Auseklis Ozols won one of the 1963 prizes
1963; 138th	Second					
1963; 138th	Third					
1964; 139th	First					Philip Butler White won one of the 1964 prizes Auseklis Ozols won one of the 1964 prizes
1964; 139th	Second					
1964; 139th	Third					
1965; 140th	First					
1965; 140th	Second					
1965; 140th	Third					
1966; 141st	First					
1966; 141st	Second					
1966; 141st	Third					
1967; 142nd	First					Philip Butler White won one of the 1967 prizes
1967; 142nd	Second					
1967; 142nd	Third			Renie Perkins, "Aquarium," privately owned. Artist deceased 1968. Award plaque at bottom of frame.		
1968; 143rd	First					Philip Butler White won either a 1968 Hallgarten or Clarke; Prize (conflicting sources)
1968; 143rd	Second					
1968; 143rd	Third					
1969; 144th	First					
1969; 144th	Second					
1969; 144th	Third					

=== 1970–2008 ===
Year Exhibition	Class	Artist	Work	Image	Current location	Notes
1970; 145th	First					
1970; 145th	Second					
1970; 145th	Third					
1971; 146th	First					Charles Reid won one of the 1971 prizes
1971; 146th	Second					
1971; 146th	Third					
1972; 147th	First					Larry Francis, PAFA instructor, won one of the 1972 prizes Paul Wiesenfeld won one of the 1972 prizes.
1972; 147th	Second					
1972; 147th	Third					
1973; 148th	First	Jerome Witkin				
1973; 148th	Second					
1973; 148th	Third					
1974; 149th	First					Saul Chase won one of the 1974 prizes
1974; 149th	Second					
1974; 149th	Third					
1975; 150th	First					Gary T. Erbe won one of the 1975 prizes
1975; 150th	Second					
1975; 150th	Third					
1976; 151st	First	Charles Pfahl				
1976; 151st	Second					
1976; 151st	Third					
1977; 152nd	First					Saul Chase won one of the 1977 prizes.
1977; 152nd	Second					
1977; 152nd	Third					
1978; 153rd	First					
1978; 153rd	Second					
1978; 153rd	Third					
1979; 154th	First					
1979; 154th	Second					
1979; 154th	Third					
1980; 155th	First					
1980; 155th	Second					
1980; 155th	Third					
1981; 156th	First					Phyllis Herfield won one of the 1981 prizes
1981; 156th	Second					
1981; 156th	Third					
1982; 157th	First					Richard Pantell won one of the 1982 prizes Gilbert Riou won one of the 1982 prizes Charles Pfahl won one of the 1982 prizes
1982; 157th	Second					
1982; 157th	Third					
1983; 158th	First					
1983; 158th	Second					
1983; 158th	Third					
1984; 159th	First					
1984; 159th	Second					
1984; 159th	Third					
1985; 160th	First					
1985; 160th	Second					
1985; 160th	Third					
1986; 161st	First					Thomas E. Dooley won one of the 1986 prizes for Gone to Supper
1986; 161st	Second					
1986; 161st	Third					
1987; 162nd	First					
1987; 162nd	Second					
1987; 162nd	Third					
1988; 163rd	First					Valeri Larko won one of the 1988 prizes Henry Finkelstein won one of the 1988 prizes Alice Zinnes won one of the 1988 prizes
1988; 163rd	Second					
1988; 163rd	Third					
1989; 164th	First					
1989; 164th	Second					
1989; 164th	Third					
1990; 165th	First					Alice Zinnes won one of the 1990 prizes
1990; 165th	Second					
1990; 165th	Third					
1991; 166th	First					
1991; 166th	Second					
1991; 166th	Third					
1992; 167th	First					Valeri Larko won one of the 1992 prizes Andrew S. Conklin won one of the 1992 prizes Jerry Weiss won one of the 1992 prizes
1992; 167th	Second					
1992; 167th	Third					
1993; 168th	First					
1993; 168th	Second					
1993; 168th	Third					
1994; 169th	First	Christian Vincent				
1994; 169th	Second					
1994; 169th	Third					
1995; 170th	First					
1995; 170th	Second					
1995; 170th	Third					
1996; 171st	First					Eran Reshef won one of the 1996 prizes
1996; 171st	Second					
1996; 171st	Third					
1997; 172nd	First					
1997; 172nd	Second					
1997; 172nd	Third					
1998; 173rd	First					Eric Aho won one of the 1998 prizes
1998; 173rd	Second					
1998; 173rd	Third					
1999; 174th	First					
1999; 174th	Second					
1999; 174th	Third					
2000; 175th	First					
2000; 175th	Second					
2000; 175th	Third					
2001; 176th	First					
2001; 176th	Second					
2001; 176th	Third					
2002; 177th	First					Beginning in 2002, NAD's annual exhibitions became biennial, with Hallgarten Prizes awarded only in even years. "Invitational" exhibitions were mounted in odd years.
2002; 177th	Second					
2002; 177th	Third					
2003; 178th		No awards				Invitational Exhibition
2004; 179th	First					
2004; 179th	Second					
2004; 179th	Third					
2005; 180th		No awards				Invitational Exhibition
2006; 181st	First					Rachael Wren won one of the 2006 prizes Cynthia Sobel won one of the 2006 prizes.
2006; 181st	Second					
2006; 181st	Third					
2007; 182nd		No awards				Invitational Exhibition
2008; 183rd	First					Beau Chamberlain (b. 1976) won one of the 2008 prizes.
2008; 183rd	Second					
2008; 183rd	Third					
2009; 184th		No awards				Invitational Exhibition
