= Dines Carlsen =

American painter

Dines Carlsen (March 28, 1901 – October 1, 1966) was an American Expressionist painter. He was a student at, and later a member of, the National Academy of Design. He also exhibited frequently at the Pennsylvania Academy of Fine Arts. He was known particularly for his still life paintings, and in his memory his wife established the Emil and Dines Carlsen Award to recognize the academy's best still life painter annually.

== Biography ==
Carlsen was born in New York City on March 28, 1901, the son of the well-known Danish-American artist Emil Carlsen. Carlsen was homeschooled by his parents. His mother taught him academic subjects and his father instructed him in art. Consequently, his paintings bear a marked resemblance to his father's work.

He began exhibiting with the prestigious National Academy of Design in 1915 and he won the Julius Hallgarten Prize twice, in 1919 and 1923. He became an Associate of the National Academy in 1922 and a full member of the National Academy of Design in 1942.

Carlsen divided his time between his family's New York home and studio and their home in Falls Village, Connecticut, until his father's death in 1933. Thereafter, he lived in Falls River and wintered in Summerville, South Carolina.

Carlsen taught students privately in his home. He exhibited his work with the artist's cooperative Grand Central Art Galleries and had solo exhibitions in 1946, 1950 and 1954.

In 1951, he married Florence Gulick Shaw in West Orange, New Jersey.

Carlsen died on October 1, 1966, at St. Luke's Hospital in New York City, and was survived by his wife, Florence. Following his death in 1966, Grand Central mounted a dual exhibition of his and his father's work.
