= Harry Roseland =

American painter

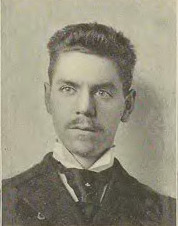
- Born: 1867; Brooklyn
- Died: December 20, 1950

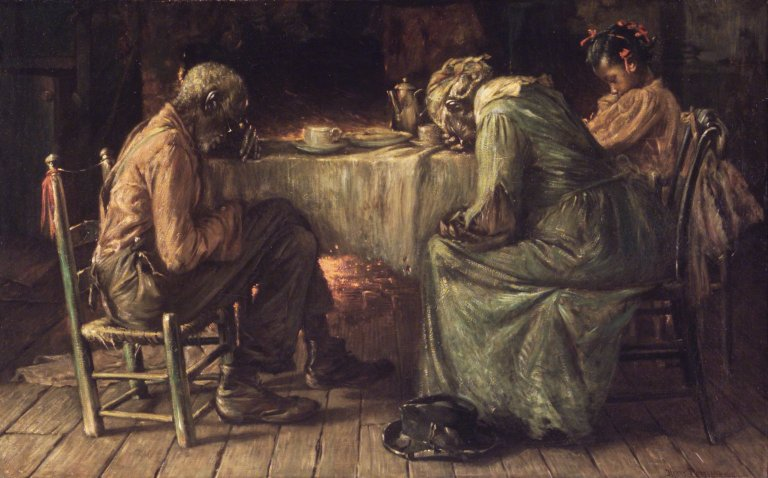
The Blessing by Harry Roseland

Harry Herman Roseland (c. 1867–1950) was an American painter of genre in the early 20th century. He was known primarily for paintings centered on poor African-Americans. Roseland himself was white.

Roseland was largely self-taught, and never traveled to Europe to study art, as did many of the American artists of his time. However, he did receive instruction from John Bernard Whittaker and later, James Carroll Beckwith. One of his most popular subjects were his paintings of black women fortune tellers who read the palms and tea leaves of white women clients. These paintings were widely reproduced during the early 20th century in the form of postcard sets and large full-colour prints that were distributed as Sunday supplements in newspapers. While known most for his paintings of African Americans, his work encompassed many genres, including seascapes and portraits. He also gained renown for his paintings of laborers in the coastal areas of New England and New York and his many interior paintings.

Roseland was born and lived his entire life in Brooklyn. He was a member of the Salmagundi Club and the Brooklyn Society of Artists; in the latter organization he was a member of the executive board.

Oprah Winfrey has stated that her favorite painting in her personal collection is Roseland's 1904 work, To the Highest Bidder.

== Awards ==
Roseland won many awards in his lifetime. These include gold medals from the Brooklyn Art Club (1888), the Boston Art Club (1904), and the American Art Society in Philadelphia (1907). The National Academy of Design awarded him the 1898 Second Hallgarten Prize for An Important Letter. Roseland received many other medals and awards as well.
