= Louis Moeller =

American painter (1855–1930)

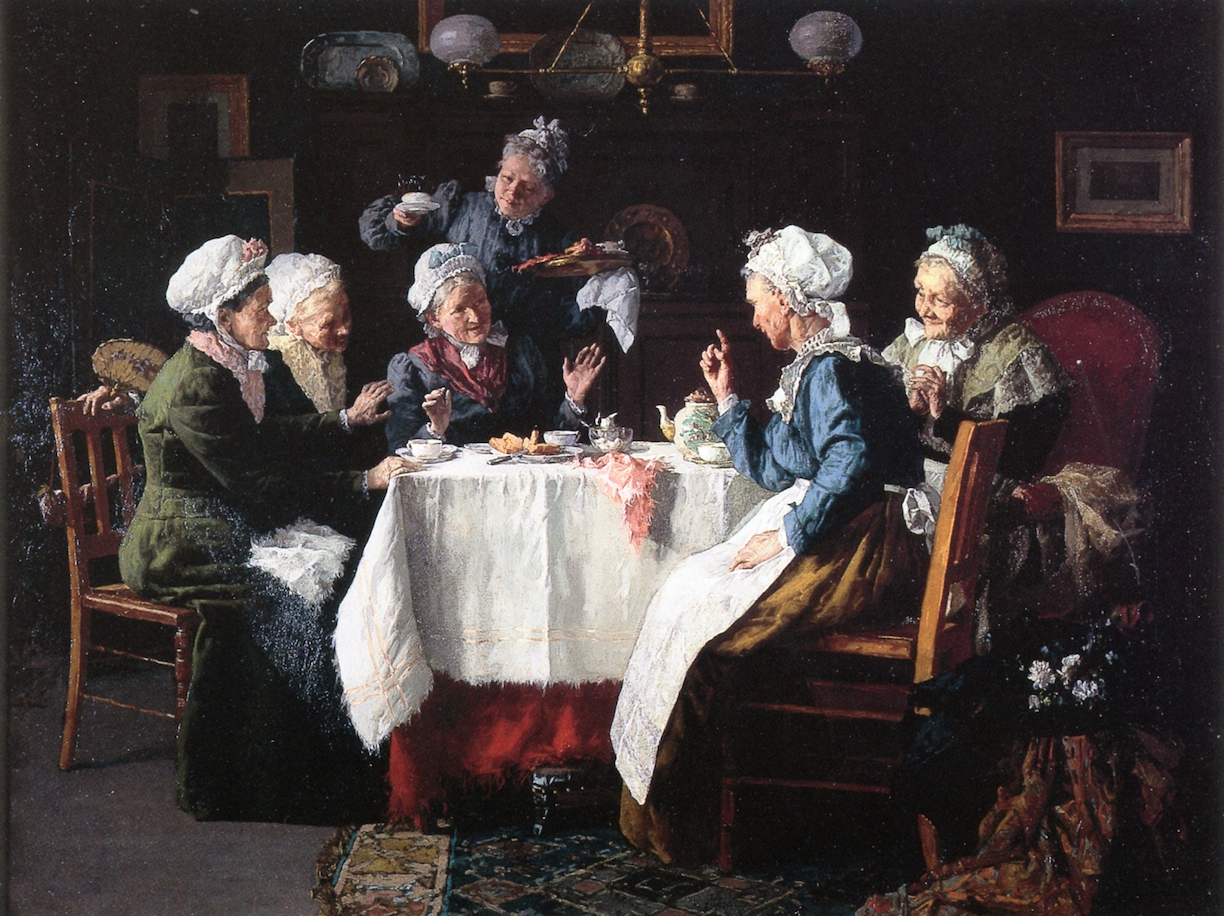
Tea Party (1905)

Louis Charles Moeller (5 August 1855 – 1930) was an American genre painter.

== Biography ==
He was born in New York City. He was the son of a decorative painter, with whom he served a three years' apprenticeship. He then studied painting in New York with E. M. Ward and Will Hicok Low, and in Munich with Feodor Dietz and Frank Duveneck. His meager resources obligated him to return from Munich back home to New York in 1883, where he again devoted himself to decorative painting.

The year of his return, he submitted A Girl in a Snow-Storm to the National Academy of Design's annual exhibition. The following year he submitted Puzzled, and was awarded the First Hallgarten Prize. He was elected an Associate of the National Academy in 1884, and elected an Academician in 1895. He died in Weehawken, New Jersey, in 1930.

== Works ==
Among his paintings are:

- “An Interior” (1886)
- “A Doubtful Investment”
- "A Good Start in Life" (1909)
- “A Siesta”
- “Bluffing”
- ”Discussing the News”
- ”Card Players” (ca. 1875)
- ”Elderly Couple Seated at Table”
- ”Interior of an Artist's Studio”
- "Jolly Topers" (ca. 1880)
- ”Legal Advice”
- “Morning News”
- “Road to School” (1883)
- “Short Measure” (1885)
- “Stubborn”
- "The Bibliomaniacs"
- "The Chemist"
- "Tea Party" (1905)
- ”Tending the Cows”
- ”Unknown Man”
- "Interested"

== Gallery ==
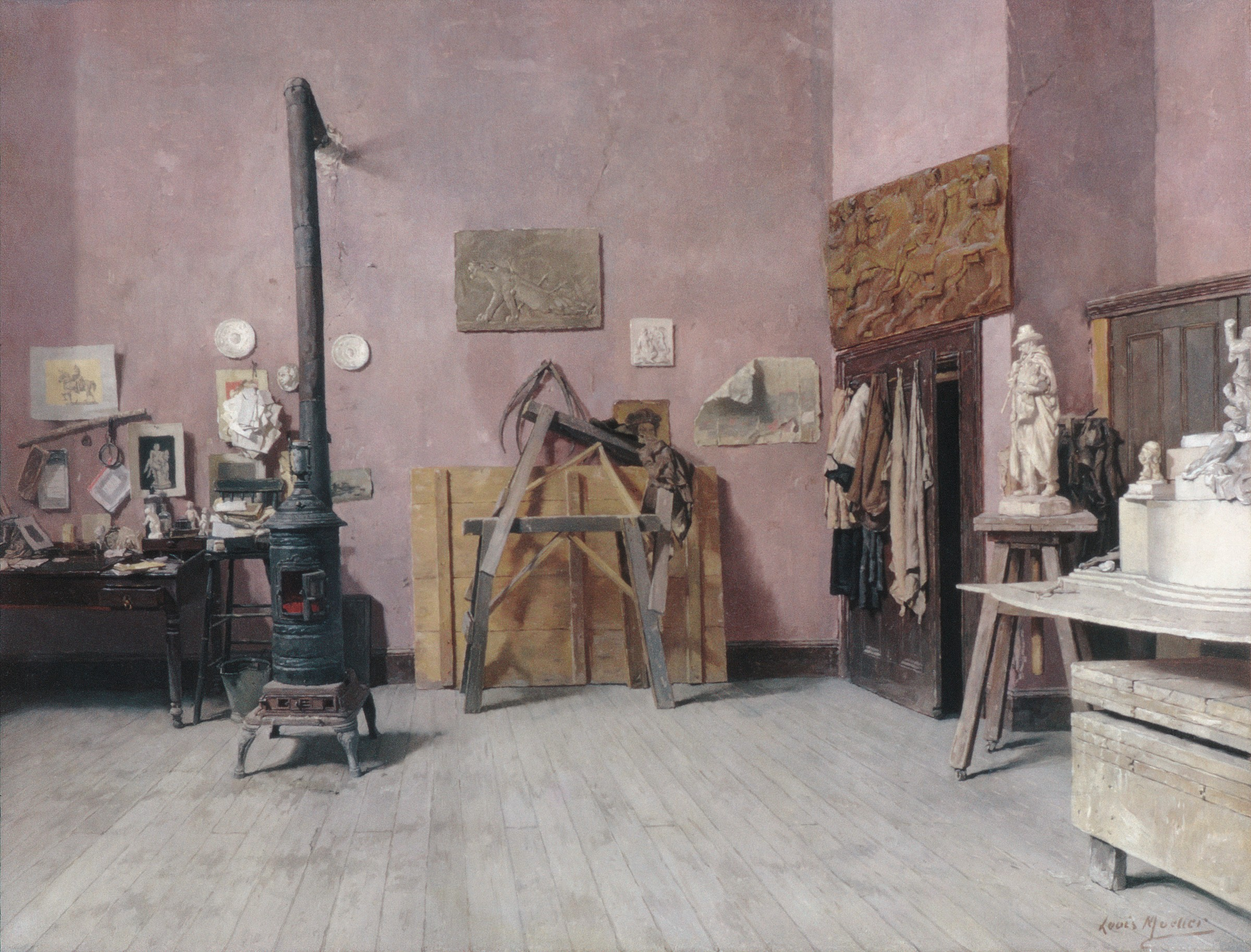
Sculptor's Studio, 1880s, Metropolitan Museum of Art, New York

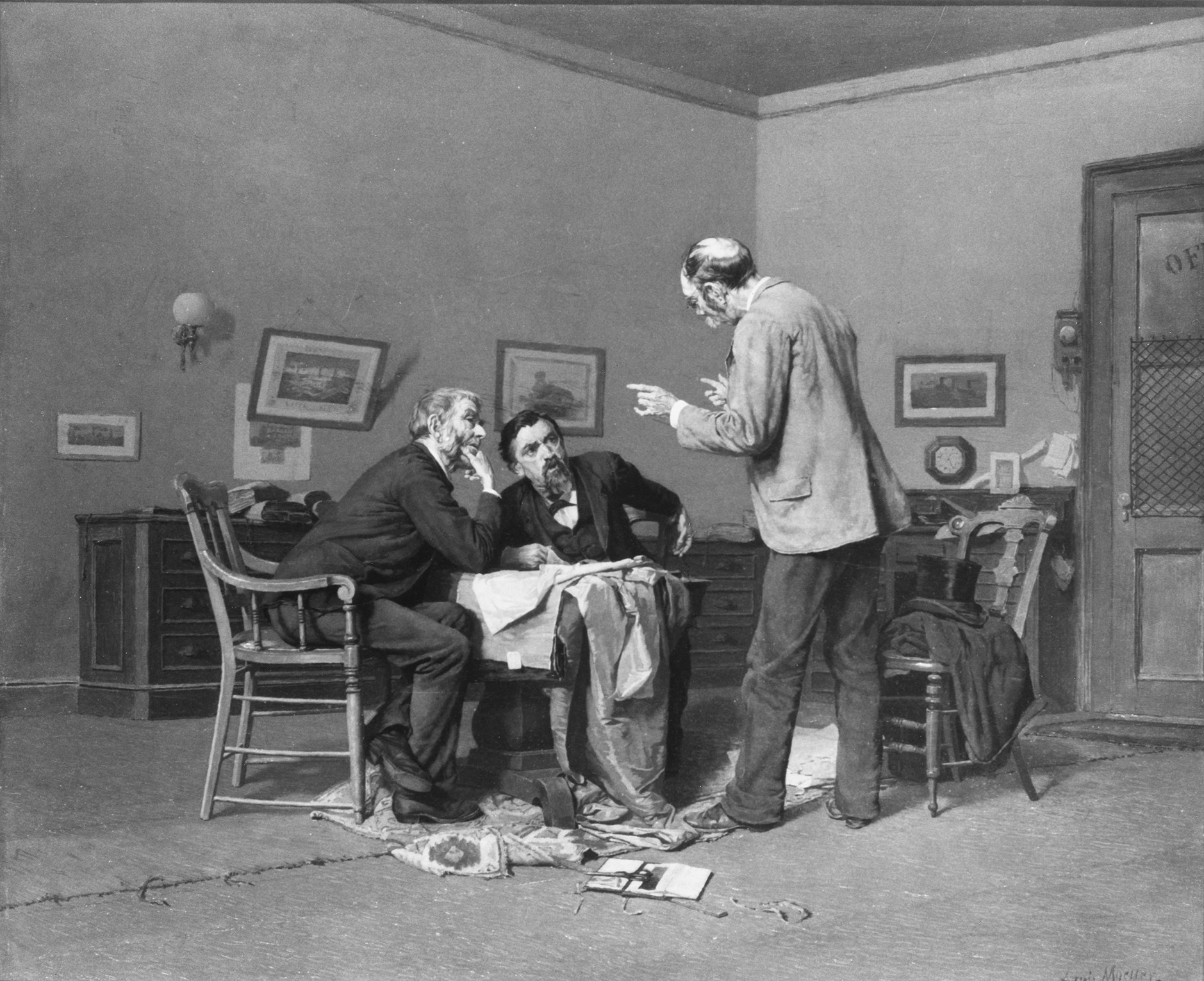
Appraisement, by 1888, Metropolitan Museum of Art, New York

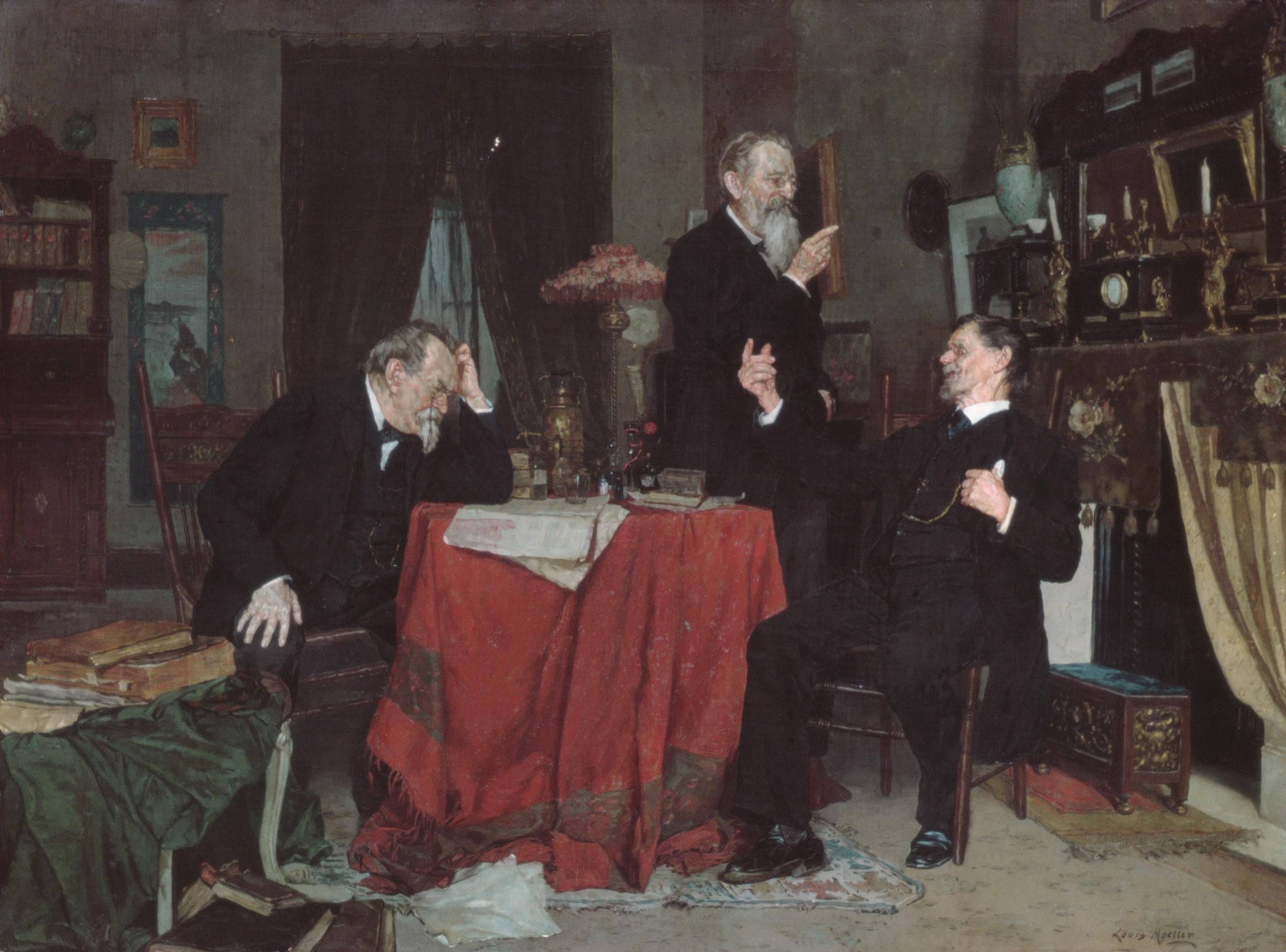
A Discussion, ca. 1890–95, Metropolitan Museum of Art, New York

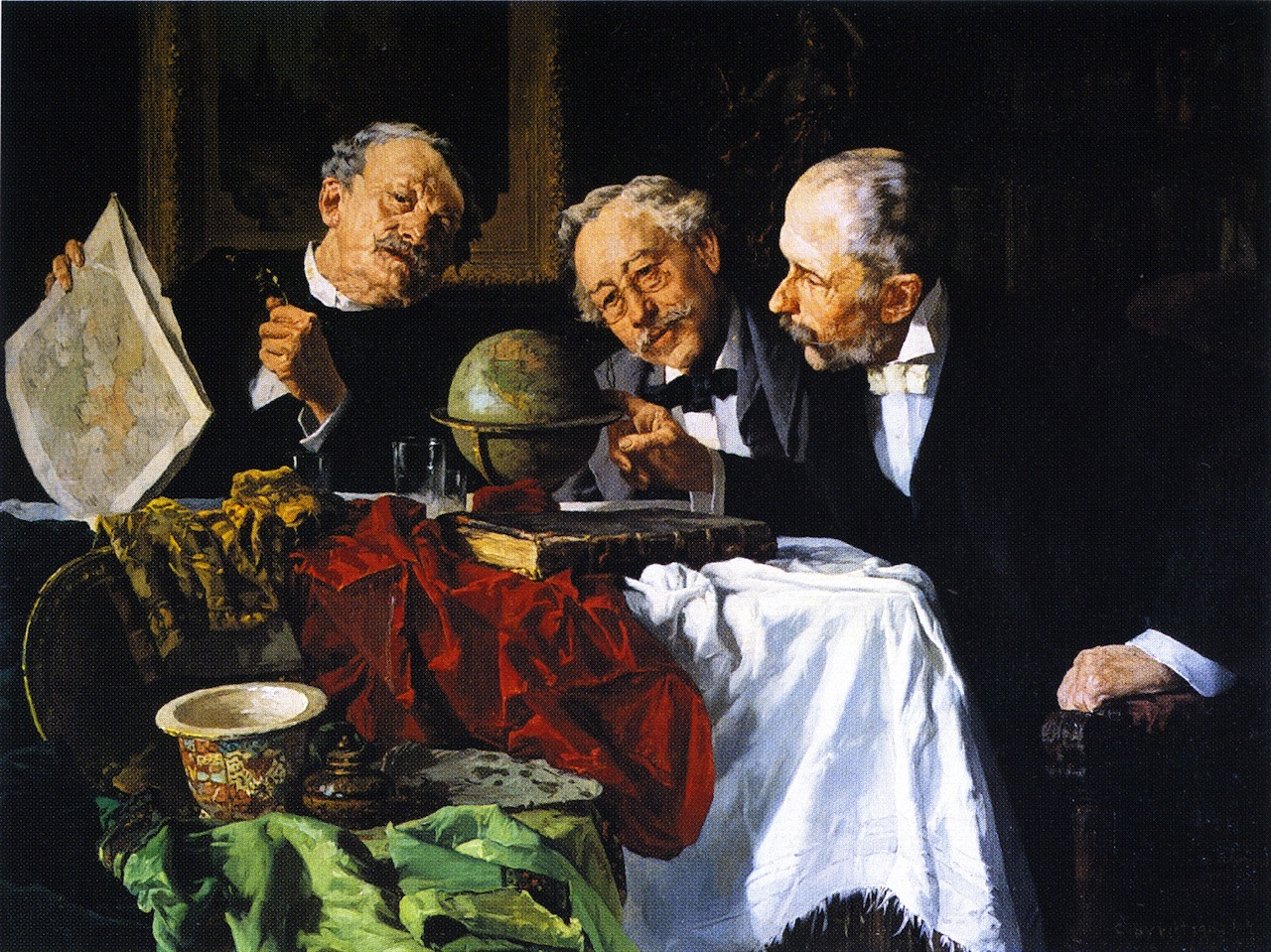
Home Again, 1903, The Athenaeum, Boston

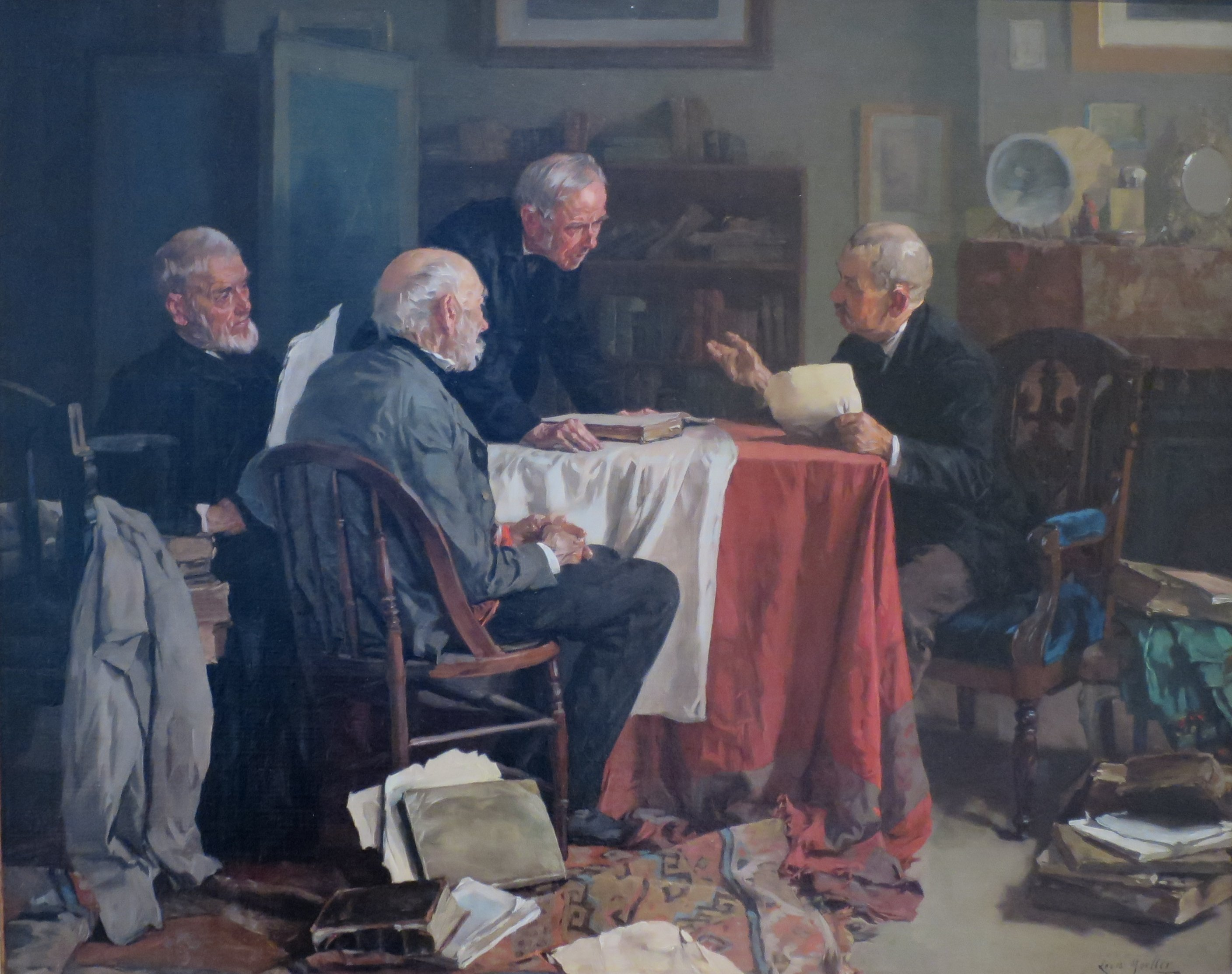
Different Opinions, High Museum of Art, Atlanta

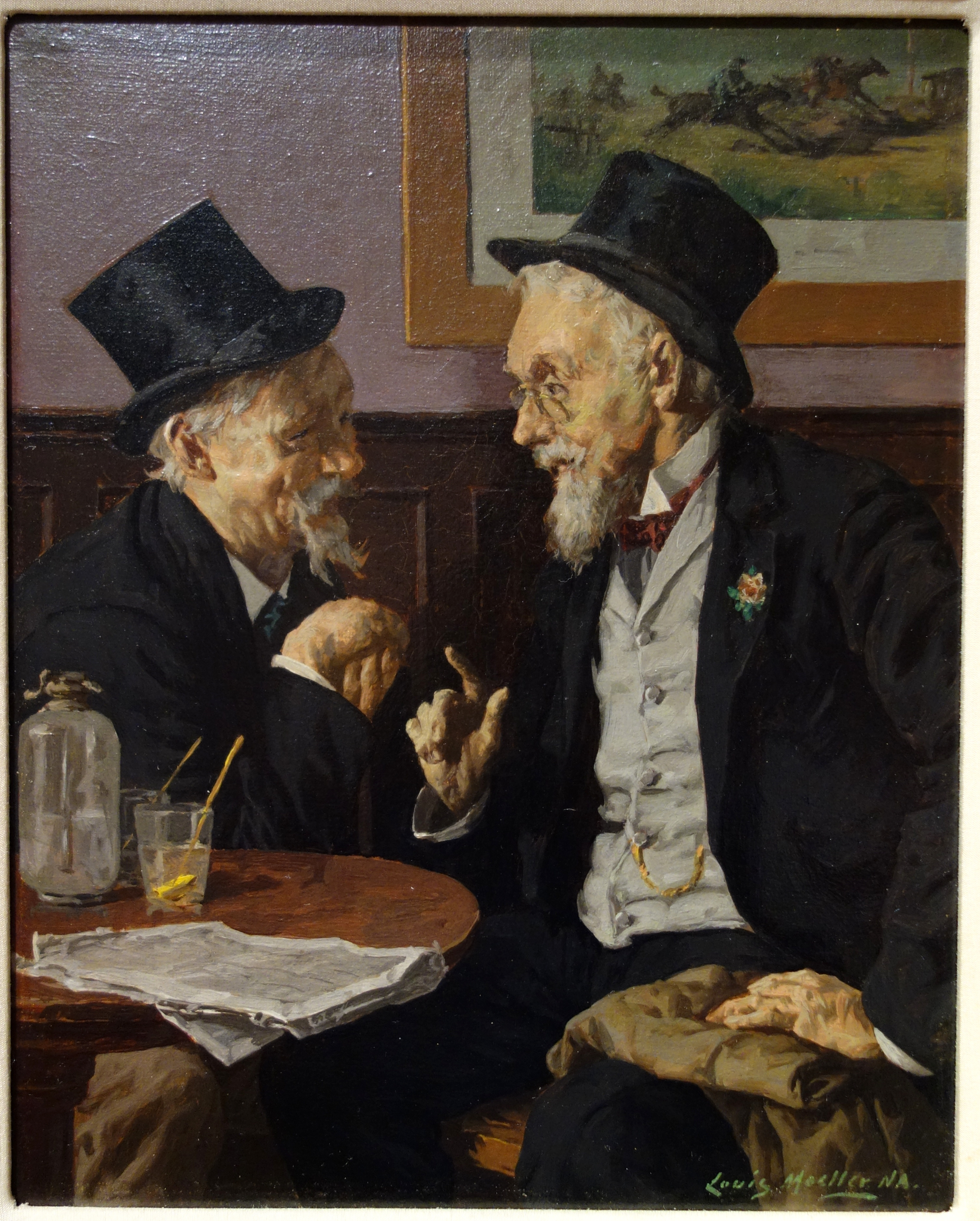
Conversation, New Britain Museum of American Art, New Britain

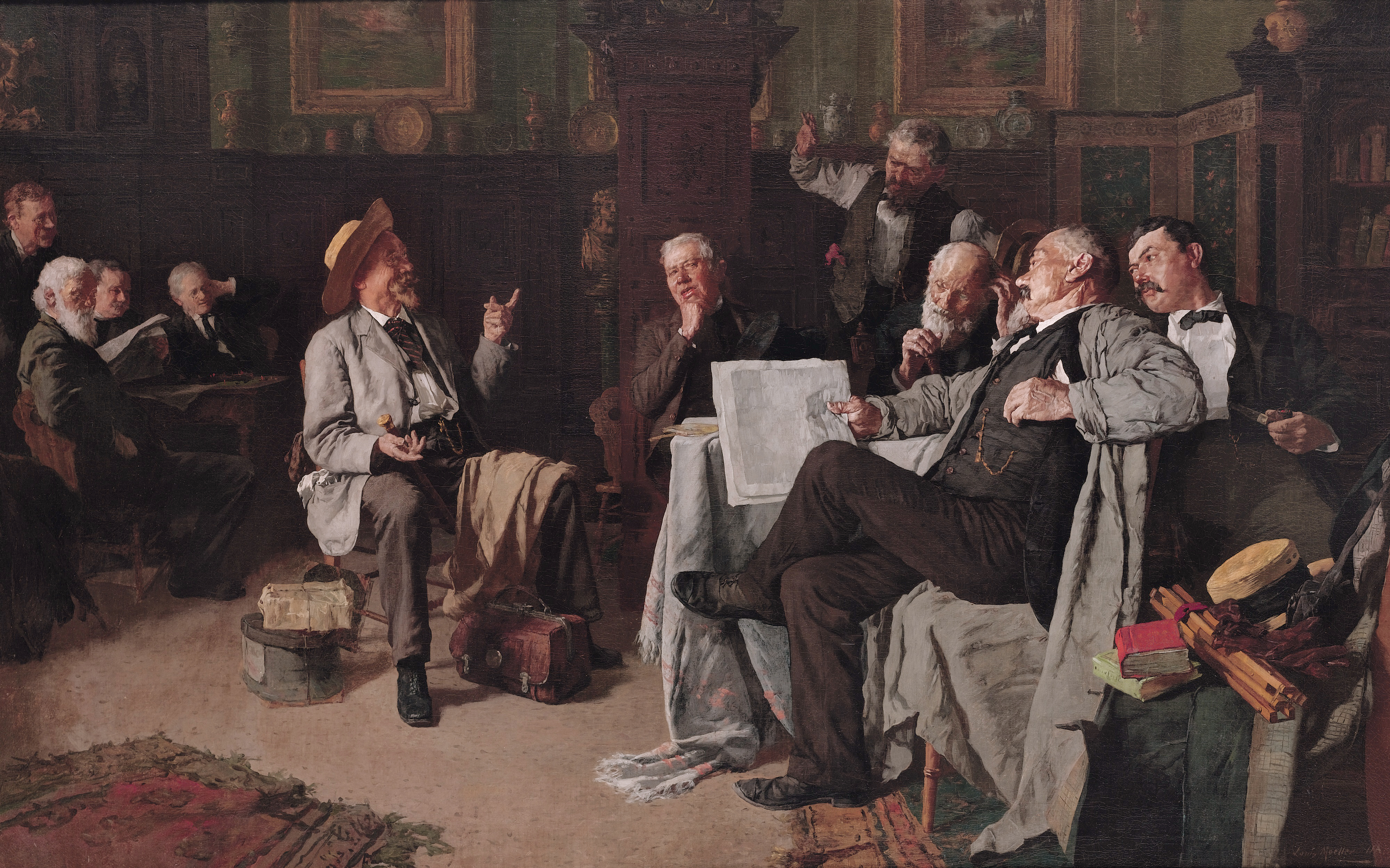
The Dubious Tale, private collection
