= Louis Paul Dessar =

American painter

- Born: January 22, 1867; Indianapolis, Indiana, U.S.
- Died: February 14, 1952 (aged 85); Preston, Connecticut, U.S.
- Education: City College of New York; National Academy of Design; Académie Julian
- Occupation: Painter

Louis Paul Dessar (January 22, 1867 – February 14, 1952) was an American painter. He painted the portraits of New York City's high society as well as Connecticut's farmers.

== Life ==
Dessar was born on January 22, 1867, in Indianapolis, Indiana. He grew up in New York City, and he graduated from City College of New York in 1881, followed by the National Academy of Design in 1886. He also studied in Paris, France, where he attended the Académie Julian and the École des Beaux-Arts.

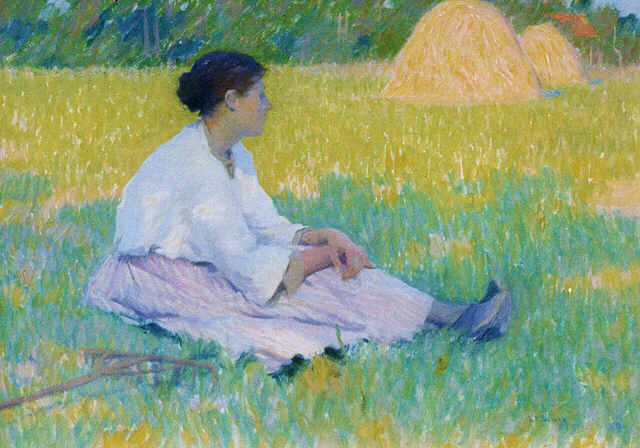
Summer Sunlight, 1894.

Dessar began his career by painting the portraits of New York City's high society. He later moved to Connecticut, where he joined the Old Lyme art colony in 1902. Influenced by the Barbizon school, he began painting Connecticut's farmers at work. His work was exhibited at the Salon, where he won a silver medal in 1891, as well as the Metropolitan Museum of Art in New York City. The National Academy of Design awarded him the 1899 Second Hallgarten Prize for Portrait of Mrs. Ruthrauff, and the 1900 First Hallgarten Prize for Landscape with Sheep.

Dessar died on February 14, 1952, in Preston, Connecticut, at the age of 85.
