= Jes Wilhelm Schlaikjer =

American artist (1897–1982)

- Born: September 22, 1897; At sea on the Kaiser Wilhelm der Grosse
- Died: August 21, 1982 (aged 84); Washington, D.C.
- Education: Art
- Alma mater: École des Beaux-Arts, Art Institute of Chicago
- Spouse: Gladys de Groot
- Awards: Hallgarten Prize

Jes Wilhelm Schlaikjer (1897–1982) was an American artist, most known for his recruitment and war bond posters during World War II.

== Early life ==
Schlaikjer was born during a storm at sea on the maiden voyage of the SS Kaiser Wilhelm der Grosse. His parents, Erich Hansen Schlaikjer and Clara Ryser, were emigrating from Germany to New York. Supposedly, at first, they named their son, Wilhelm Parker Schlaikjer, after the ship and the ship's American pilot, William Parker.

His father was a successful salesman of drug remedies. Erich and Clara were married in Germany in 1896.

The Schlaikjer family lived in Ohio and Johnstown City, Kentucky, before settling down on a farm in Carter township, Tripp County, South Dakota, in 1907. Jes Wilhelm was the firstborn of five children: Arthur, Oscar, Hugo, and Erich.

From an early age, Schlaikjer enjoyed drawing and was known for his talent in school. At first, he enjoyed painting the horses he saw roaming the plains. His cartoons were featured in a local newspaper in Carter, South Dakota, when he was 13 years old. Later in his teen years, Schlaikjer worked for a Chicago newspaper as an artist and cartoonist.

In 1916, he graduated from Winner High School.

== Military and education ==
After graduating from high school, Schlaikjer enlisted in the Army. During World War I, he served in the Signal Corps of the Army's 1st Division in France as a telegrapher. After some time, he "rose in rank" to Chief Receiving Operator at the Layfayette Radio Station in Paris. This was the "main continental communication link for the Allied forces."

When the war was over, Schlaikjer decided to stay in France. He studied at the École des Beaux Arts in Lyons.

On June 3, 1920, he returned to his parents' farm in South Dakota. During this time, he worked as a telegrapher for the Chicago, Burlington, and Quincey railroad lines. In September, Schlaikjer moved to Chicago and studied at the School of the Art Institute. Here, he met illustrator Dean Cornwell and painter Harvey Dunn. Schlaikjer studied under Robert Henri.

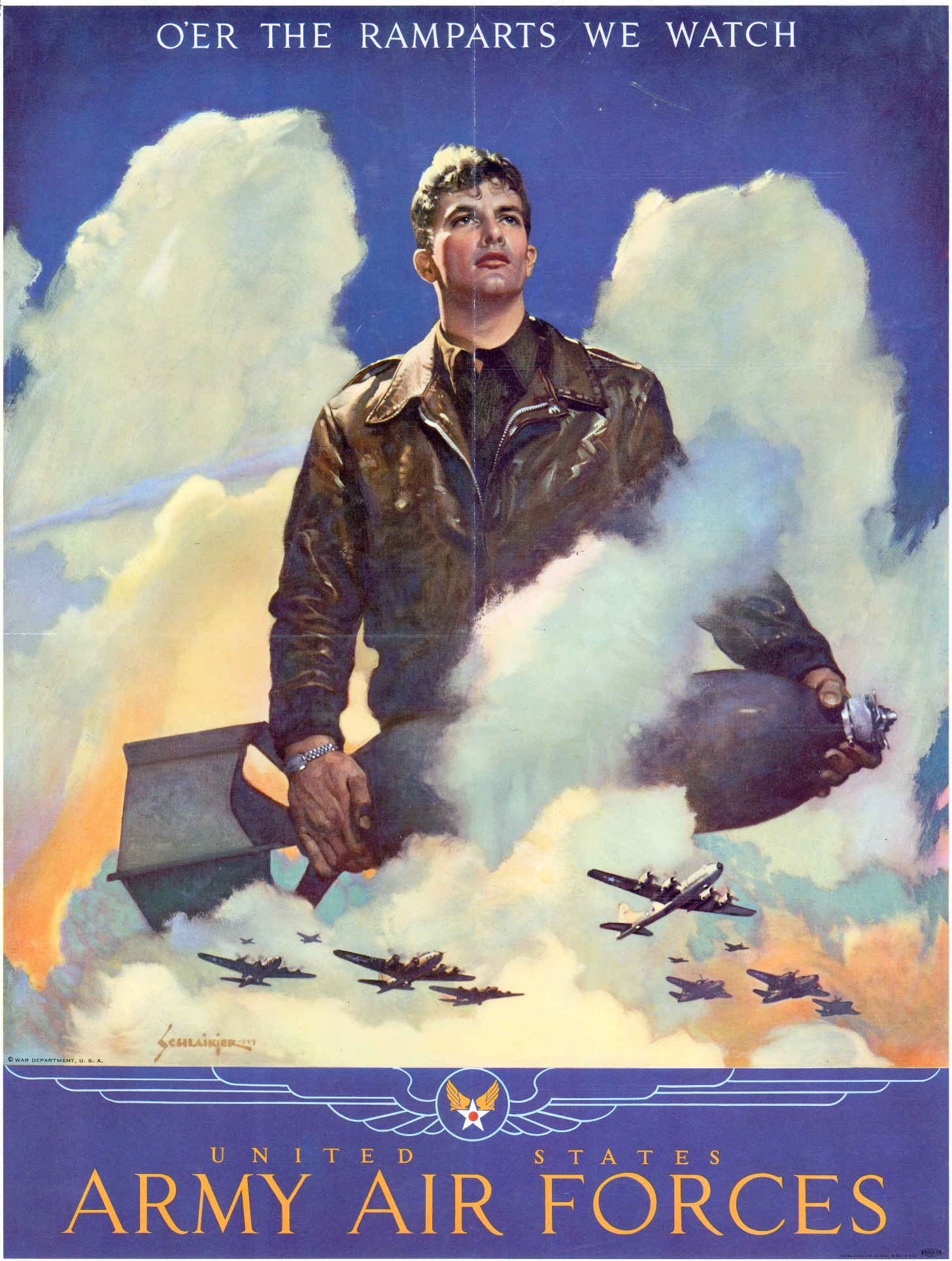
O'er the Ramperts We Watch featured in 1945 Monthly Catalog, Schlaikjer (1944).

== Art career ==
Schlaikjer's illustrations appeared in various magazines, including Scribner's, Collier's, American Legion Monthly, Redbook, Woman's Home Companion, and Cosmopolitan.

He often painted covers for pulp magazines such as Black Mask, Adventure, Everybody's Magazine, Frontier Stories, and West. Schlaikjer's signature on these covers was always scribbled in a splat that contained his initials and the date. This may have been an intentional cover-up to disguise his work without "jeopardizing" his career with the more "slick" magazines.

In 1926, Schlaikjer earned the first Hallgarten prize at the National Academy of Design Annual Exhibition. He received this award for a portrait of his wife titled "The Pink Cameo."

On November 21, 1928, he won the $1000 first prize from the National Academy of Design. This same year, he was the winner of the first Altman prize for the best figure painting by an American-born citizen for South Dakota Evening.

In 1932, Schlaikjer was again awarded the Hallgarten prize for his painting titled "The Little Ones."

In October 1930, Schlaikjer opened an art studio near the Art Students League.

In 1932, he began teaching at the National Academy of Design. He was also made an honorary member of the school.

Along with other conservative artists, Cromwell and Schlaikjer founded the Advance American Art Commission. This was done in response to the controversy surrounding Diego Rivera's mural at Rockefeller Center. Their purpose was to cope with the "existing foreign evils and abuses threatening American Art."

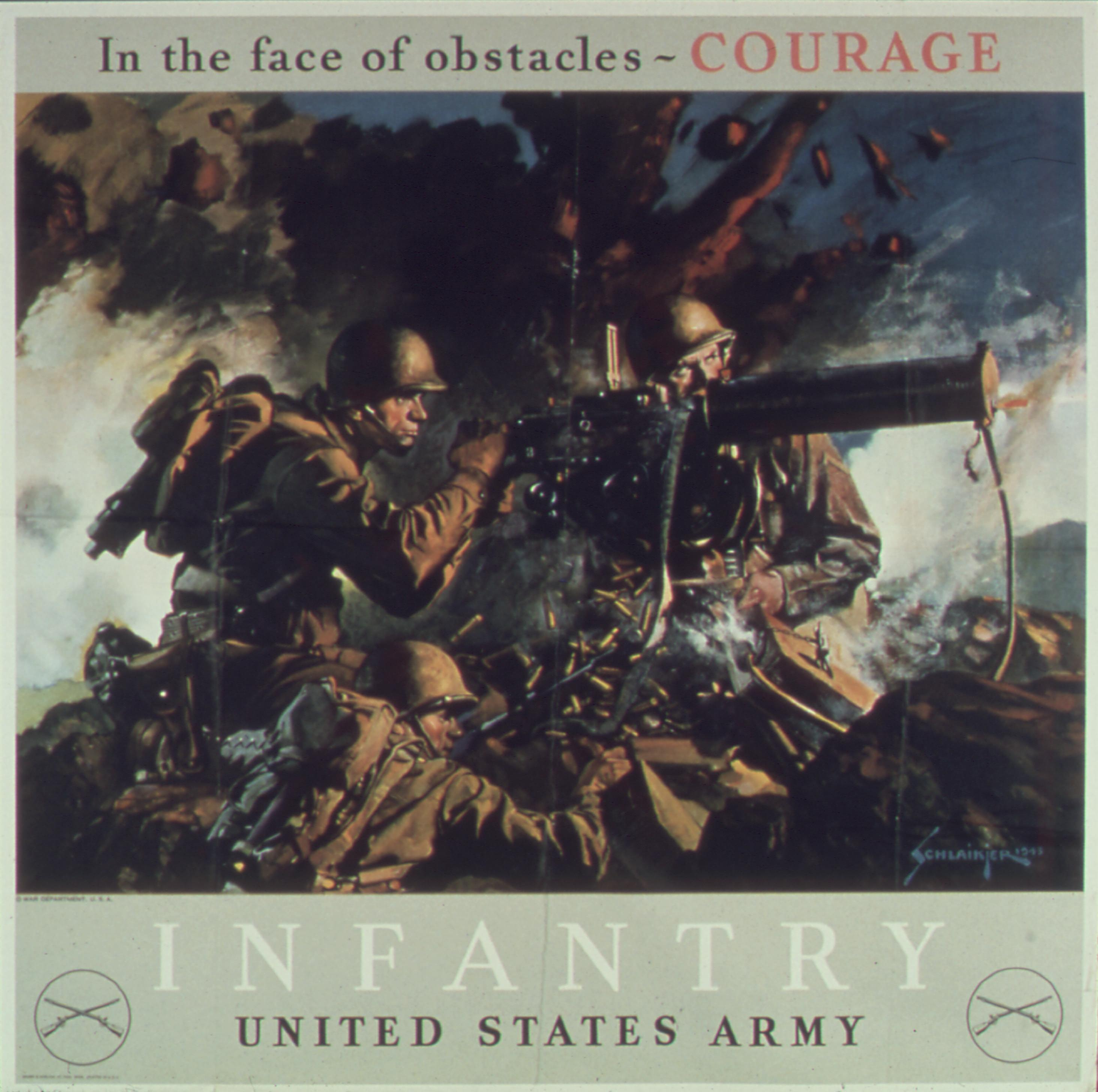
In the Face of Obstacles-Courage, US WWII propaganda poster

In 1942, he was chosen as the War Department artist during World War II. Schlaikjer painted posters for recruitment, war bonds, the Red Cross, the infantry, the Signal Corps, Military Police, the Army Air Force, the Marines, the Navy, and the Women's Army Corps. He was also the portraitist for military leaders, including Dwight D. Eisenhower, Douglas MacArthur, and George S. Patton. At the time, he had a studio in The Pentagon. These portraits now hang in the War College in Washington in Washington D.C.

After the war, Schlaikjer set up a portrait studio in Washington D.C.

In 1947, he taught at the Newark School of Fine and Industrial Arts.

In 1948, Schlaikjer's membership in the National Academy of Design was elevated from associate member to full membership.

Schlaikjer had work exhibited at the Pennsylvania Academy of Fine Arts in Philadelphia and the Corcoran Gallery of Art in Washington D.C.

His historical portrait of Abraham Lincoln working on the Emancipation Proclamation remains one of the few paintings depicting Lincoln managing this task at the Soldier's Home.

He was a member of the National Academy of Design, the Grand Central Art Gallery, the Artists Guild, the American Legion, the Armor and Arms Club, the First Division Society, and the Salamagundi Club.

== Personal life ==
Schlaikjer met his wife, Gladys de Groot, while studying at the Art Institute. They married on September 14, 1922, and moved to New York City soon after. They lived in the Bronx as well. The couple had two children: Jes Erich (born in 1924) and Helen Jean (born in 1926). His son became an electronic engineer and engineering writer, and his daughter was an artist.

Schlaikjer began blacksmithing in the early 1930s. He first learned how to make horseshoes, and it turned into a hobby. He forged iron and made medieval armor, swords, shields, cutlery, and guns. During this time, the tools to make armor could not be bought, so Schlaikjer had to make all of his own tools.

On August 21, 1982, Schlaikjer died of Parkinson's disease at the age of 84.

== Legacy ==
Schlaikjer has had permanent exhibitions in the following places:

- National Academy of Design
- Ranger Collection
- United States Naval Academy in Annapolis, Maryland
- United States Department of War
- American Red Cross National Headquarters
- Walter Reed Army Medical Center in Washington D.C.
- United States Department of State in Washington D.C.
- Nelson Gallery, Kansas City, Missouri
- University of Indiana
- Marine Corps School of Quantico, Virginia
- Federal Reserve Bank of Kansas City
