= George Henry Bogert =

American painter

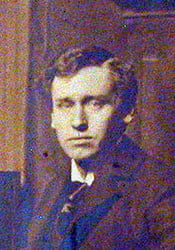
- Born: February 6, 1864; New York City
- Died: December 13, 1944 (aged 80); New York City
- Education: National Academy of Design
- Known for: Landscape art

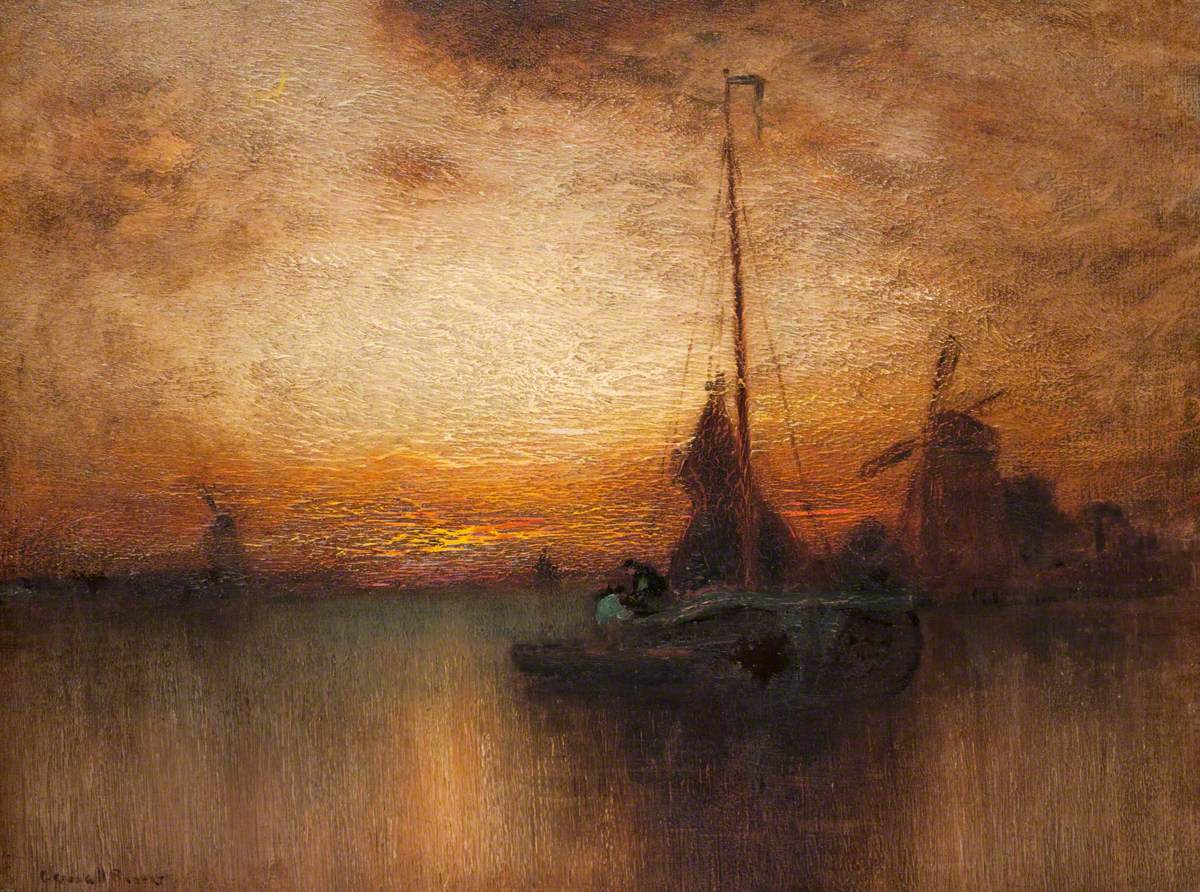
”Dutch Sunset” by George Henry Bogert.

George Henry Bogert (February 6, 1864 – December 13, 1944) was an American landscape painter.

== Life and work ==
George Henry Bogert was born in New York City, the son of Henry Bogert and Helen Anderson Evans. His father was a paper manufacturer, and a noted collector of coins, medals, and writings on numismatics. As a student at the National Academy of Design and later under Thomas Eakins in New York City, he early on displayed the talent that later brought him fame.

In 1884 he went to France and painted landscapes for a time at Grez, near the forest of Fontainebleau, afterwards going to Paris, where he studied under Colin, Aimé Morot, and Pierre Puvis de Chavannes. Four years later he returned to New York and thereafter until his death was a frequent exhibitor at the Society of American Artists, the National Academy of Design, and elsewhere. In 1899, he was elected into the National Academy of Design as an Associate member.

It was in 1901 that his landscape work began to attract attention. At the outset his achievements were tentative, but evidenced sincerity and promise. Within a few years it was evident that the artist was rapidly approaching the completeness that marks reflective work, and his paintings testified to the maturity of his style. In his summer journeys abroad he painted at Étaples on the French coast with Eugène Boudin and in the Netherlands and on the Isle of Wight. In these surroundings he found sympathetic material for many of his subsequent works. His compositions were said to preserve that truth in nature which represents true art and he became a profound synthesist, ever seeking to secure unity of ensemble and endeavoring to avoid striking a false note in his efforts to produce harmony of color and effect. His success in this direction is strikingly illustrated in his composition "Sea and Rain", and in many of his pictures the scope of his artistic vision is wide and comprehensive. A most prolific painter whose work found a ready and discriminating market. Bogert was exceedingly versatile, a characteristic that prevented him from having pronounced style.

In 1911 an exhibit of his work was held at the Albright-Knox Art Gallery in Buffalo, New York, and attracted widespread notice. His work is represented in the permanent collection of the Buffalo Fine Arts Academy, thanks to a gift from the New York merchant, George Hearn. In 1911 and 1914 he painted at the Old Lyme Art Colony in Old Lyme, Connecticut.

In 1895 Bogert executed "The English Channel from St. Ives to Lelant", which was purchased by popular subscriptions in St. Louis and presented to the St. Louis Museum of Fine Arts. He won honorable mention at the Pennsylvanian Academy of Fine Arts in 1892; was awarded the Webb Prize at the exhibition of American artists in 1868 for "Evening, Honfleur"; received the 1899 First Hallgarten Prize from the National Academy of Design; won a bronze medal at the Exposition Universelle in Paris in 1900; was awarded silver medals at the Pan-American Exposition in Buffalo in 1901 and the Louisiana Purchase Exposition at St. Louis in 1904, and received gold medals from the American Society of Arts in 1902 and 1907.

Bogerts work has been displayed in the Metropolitan Museum of Art, National Gallery, Corcoran Gallery of Art, Buffalo Fine Arts Academy, Museum of Fine Arts, Boston, Huntington Library, Pennsylvania Academy, Brooklyn Museum, Edinburgh Museum in Scotland, Shanghai Club in China, Minneapolis Institute of Art, and others, also in private collections, including those of Andrew Carnegie, Clarence Mackay, and Thomas B. Clark.

He married on June 2, 1865 Baltimore Maryland to Margaret Austin Merryman, daughter of Joseph P. Merryman, and had two children: Austin (died in childhood), and Eleanor Bogert, who married Charles Bradford Welles. He died in New York City.
