= William Anderson Coffin =

American journalist

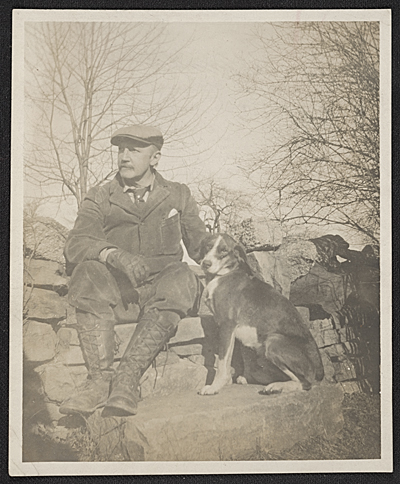
- William Anderson Coffin with his dog, ca. 1900, unidentified photographer. William Anderson Coffin papers, Archives of American Art, Smithsonian Institution.
- Born: January 31, 1855; Allegheny, Pennsylvania
- Died: October 26, 1925 (aged 70); New York, New York
- Education: Yale University
- Known for: Painting
- Awards: Second Hallgarten Prize (1886)

William Anderson Coffin (1855–1925) was an American landscape and figure painter. He also was an art critic, working for the New York Post and Harper's Weekly. In 1917 he would be awarded the French Legion of Honor.

== Personal life and education ==
Coffin was born in Allegheny, Pennsylvania, to James Gardiner Coffin and Isabella C. Anderson, on January 31, 1855. He graduated with a degree in fine art from Yale University in 1874. Three years later he would move to Paris, France, where he would study under Léon Bonnat. In 1882 he moved to New York City. The Coffin family had a farm in Jennerstown, Pennsylvania, which is now the site of Pine Springs Camp, which would appear in many of his landscape paintings. He died on October 26, 1925, in New York City.

== Artistic career ==
While in Paris Coffin would exhibit his work at the Paris Salon in 1879, 1880 and 1882. Upon moving to New York, he would exhibit at the National Academy of Design and write as an art critic for Harper's Weekly, Scribner's Magazine, New York Post, and served as art editor for The Sun. In Buffalo, New York, he directed the Fine Arts Division for the Pan-American Exposition. Coffin served as a member of the New York Advisory Board for the Panama–Pacific International Exposition in 1915. He served as president of the American Artists' Committee of One Hundred, which established a relief fund for families of French artists that served in World War I. In 1917 he was awarded the French Legion of Honor for his charitable work. He was also a member of the Architectural League of New York, the Lotos Club and the National Academy of Design.

=== Legacy ===
In 1970, his papers were donated to the Archives of American Art by Stewart Klonis, who was gifted the papers by Mrs. DeWitt M. Lockman of Manorville, New York.

=== Notable collections ===
- Kenyon Cox; Smithsonian American Art Museum
- Saturday Night in August – Eighth Avenue, c. 1900; Brooklyn Museum

=== Gallery ===
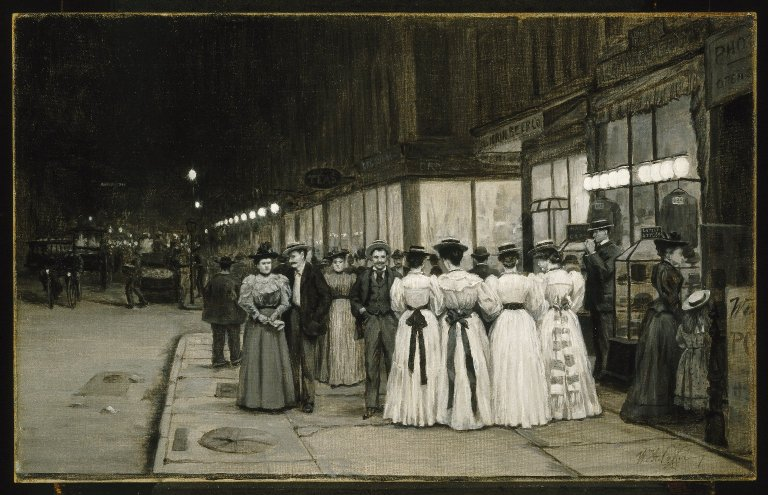
Saturday Night in August -- Eighth Avenue, ca. 1900

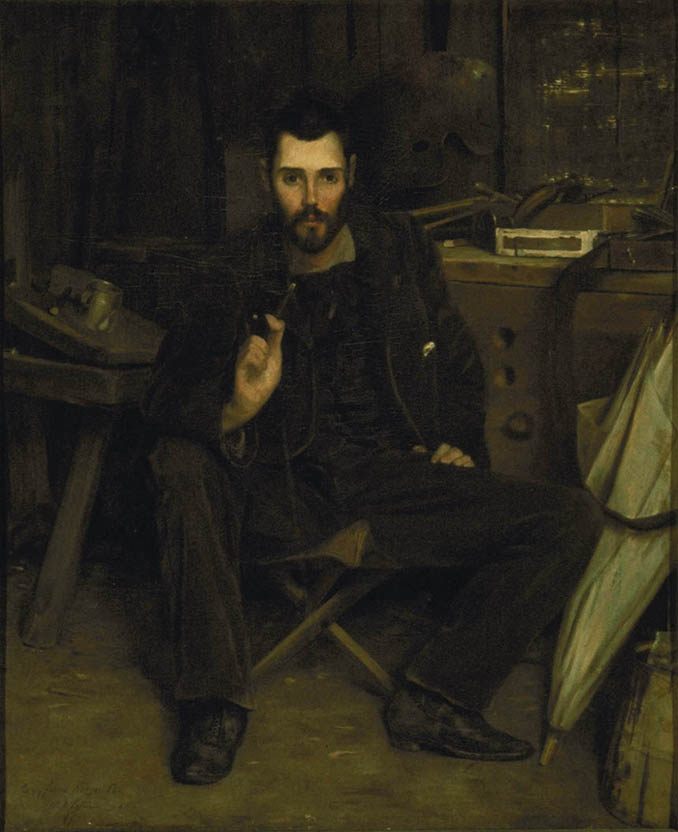
Kenyon Cox

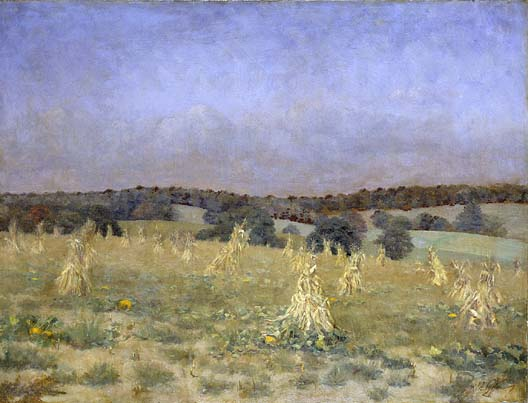
September, ca. 1907
