= Naked Young Woman in Front of a Mirror =

Painting by Giovanni Bellini

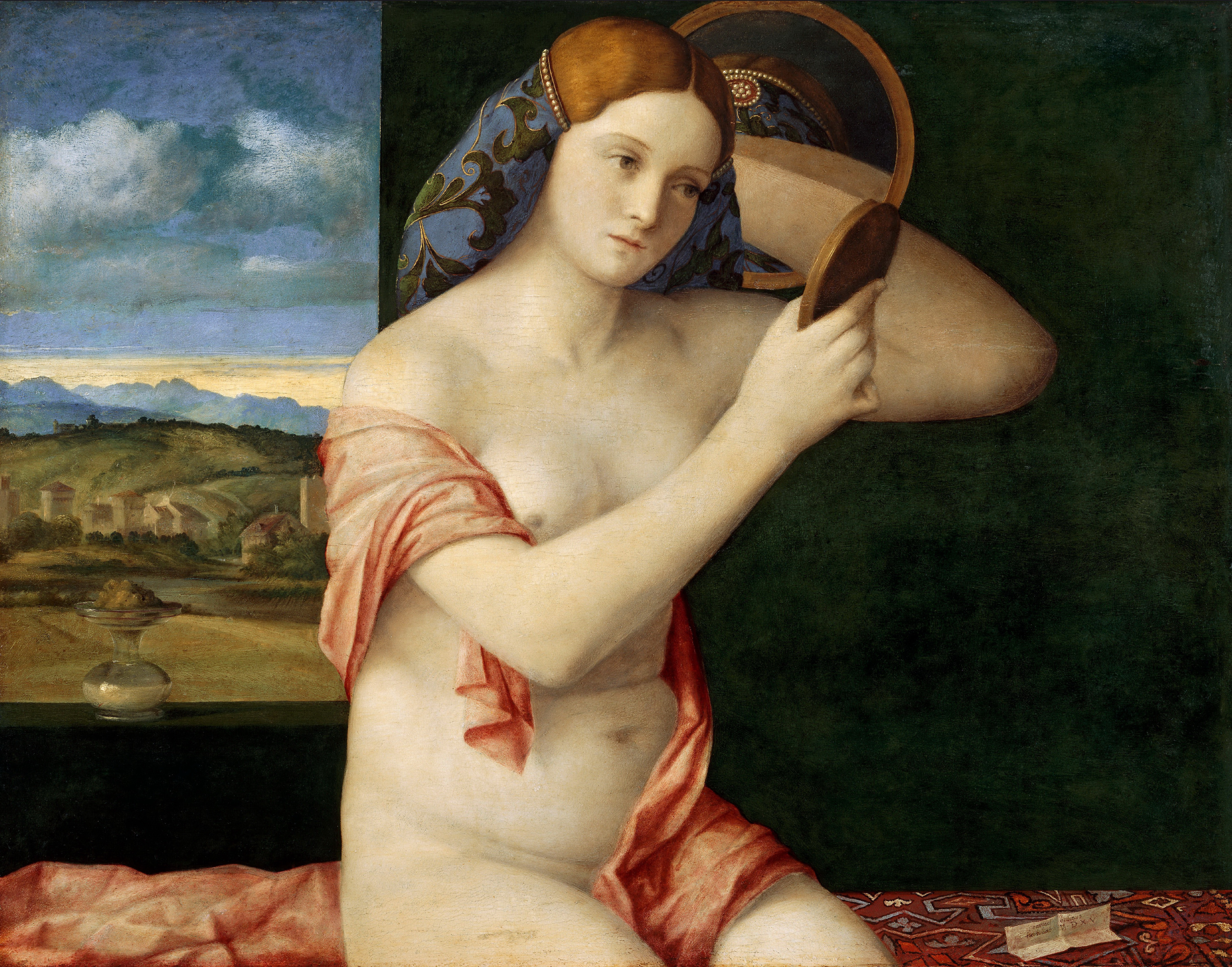
- Artist: Giovanni Bellini
- Year: 1515
- Medium: oil on poplar panel
- Dimensions: 62 cm × 79 cm (24 in × 31 in)
- Location: Kunsthistorisches Museum, Vienna

Naked Young Woman in Front of a Mirror is a painting in oil on poplar panel by the Italian Renaissance artist Giovanni Bellini. Dating to 1515, it was one of his last works, showing him responding to the tonalism introduced by Giorgione. It was acquired by James Hamilton, 1st Duke of Hamilton in 1638 and remained with his family until 1659, when it was acquired in Brussels by Leopold William of Austria. It is now in the Kunsthistorisches Museum in Vienna.

== See also ==
- List of works by Giovanni Bellini
