= Dwight William Tryon =

American painter

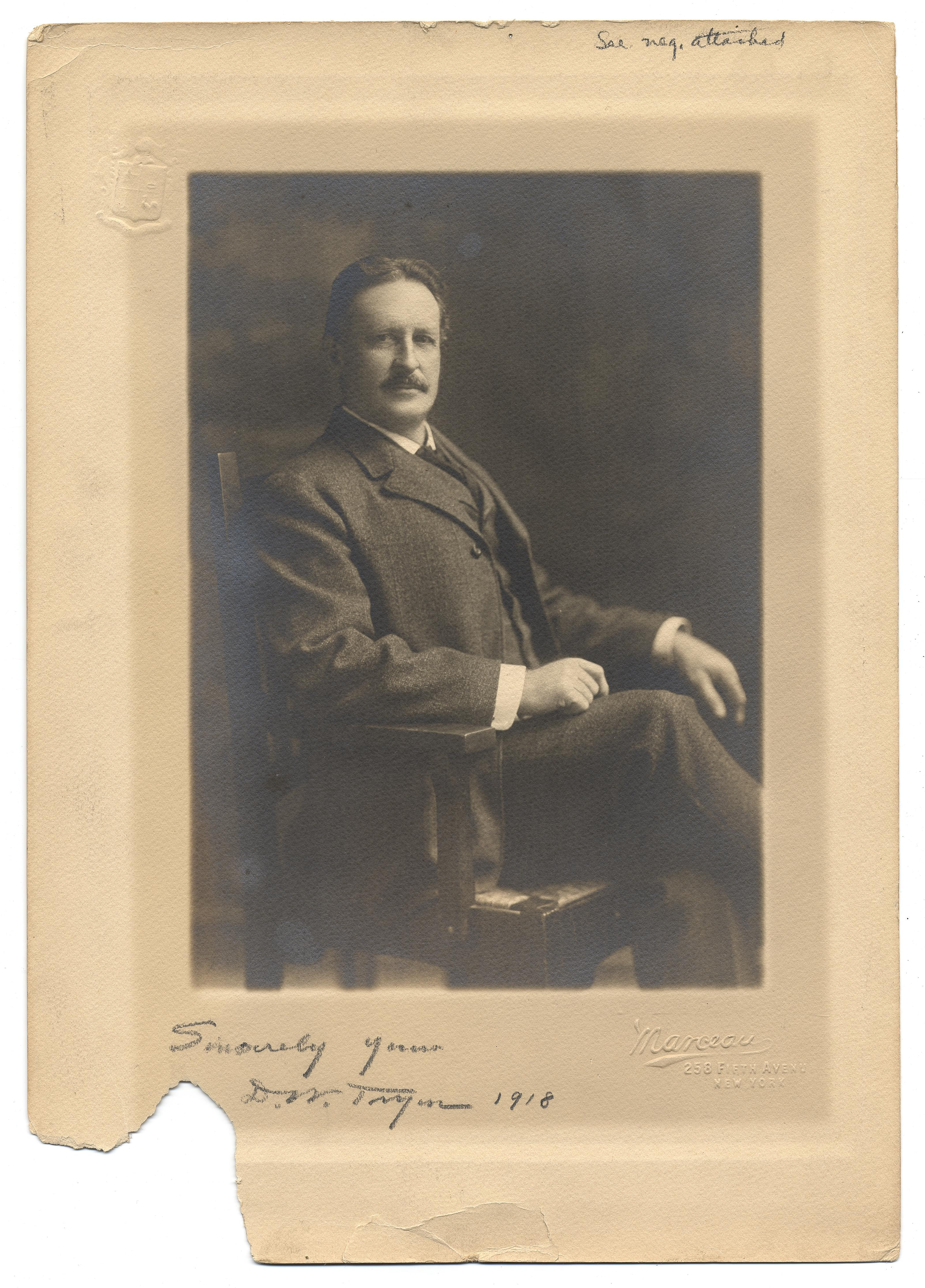
- Tryon in 1918
- Born: August 13, 1849; Hartford, Connecticut
- Died: July 1, 1925 (aged 75); South Dartmouth, Massachusetts
- Education: Pennsylvania Academy of the Fine Arts
- Known for: Painting
- Movement: Tonalism, Barbizon school
- Awards: Third Hallgarten Prize (1887)
- Patrons: Charles Lang Freer

Dwight William Tryon (August 13, 1849 – July 1, 1925) was an American landscape painter in the late 19th and early 20th centuries. His work was influenced by James McNeill Whistler, and he is best known for his landscapes and seascapes painted in a tonalist style.

== Biography ==
Tryon was born in Hartford, Connecticut, to Anson Tryon and Delia O. Roberts. His father was killed in a gun accident before Tryon reached four years of age, and Tryon was raised by his mother on his grandparents' farm in East Hartford. His interest in art evolved naturally. As a young man Tryon took a job at a prominent Hartford bookstore and studied art instruction manuals from the store shelves. He also took to sketching the surrounding countryside during his off hours.

Tryon sold his first painting in 1870. After exhibiting and selling work locally, he successfully exhibited at the National Academy of Design in 1873. His artistic convictions affirmed, Tryon married Alice Belden, quit his job at the bookstore and became a full-time artist. Some of his first works from this period are seascapes and harbor views executed in a luminist manner. Soon after, however, Tryon's style shifted towards the Barbizon school, which was then becoming popular among American artists. He may have been influenced by the works of George Inness and Alexander Helwig Wyant.

In 1876 Tryon decided to advance his skills through a formal study of art. He sold all of his paintings at auction and, with the help of a benefactor, traveled to France with his wife. He enrolled in the atelier of Jacquesson de la Chevreuse, and took classes at the École des Beaux-Arts. He also received instruction from Charles-François Daubigny, Henri Harpignies, and Jean Baptiste-Antoine Guillemet. Impressionism was blossoming in France all around Tryon, but he was not swayed by the new style and remained comfortably within the realm of the Barbizon school.

Tryon traveled and sketched Europe with his wife, and met Abbott Handerson Thayer and his wife with whom he became friends. He returned to the United States in 1881 and settled in New York City where he taught and painted landscapes. In New York, Tryon became friends with artists Robert Swain Gifford and Thomas Dewing. He became an early member of the Society of American Artists and continued to exhibit paintings to the National Academy of Design. He also became a member of the American Water Color Society and the National Institute of Arts and Letters (now The American Academy of Arts and Letters).

On the advice of Gifford, Tryon and his wife built a summer house in South Dartmouth, Massachusetts in 1887. Though he would continue to spend each winter in New York City, South Dartmouth became Tryon's home for the rest of his life. The coastal area appealed to Tryon's aesthetic sensibilities and allowed him to indulge in fishing, his favorite pastime.

By the late 1880s Tryon, working most often in oils, began painting landscapes in what would become his mature and iconic style. Tryon's paintings typically feature a group or broken row of trees in the middle distance, often colored in an autumnal hue, separating a glowing sky above and a foreground marsh or pasture below. He also continued to paint the sea in his mature career, often employing pastel to show a bare expanse of water, sky and beach in various weather and light. He exhibited his works nationally but tended to favor The Pennsylvania Academy of Fine Arts in Philadelphia and the Montross Gallery in New York.

A Detroit industrialist, Charles Lang Freer, first bought a painting by Tryon in 1889 and became his most important patron. Freer eventually bought dozens of Tryon's paintings, including many of his best works, and worked closely with Tryon in the interior design of his Detroit home. Freer, a major collector of Asian art and works by James McNeill Whistler, went on to establish the Freer Gallery of Art, part of the Smithsonian Institution in Washington, DC, where many works by Tryon can be seen today.

He took the first prize for his painting Salt-Marsh, December at the Tennessee Centennial Exposition that was held in Nashville, Tennessee in 1897. He is described in the "Fine Art Catalogue" which is copyrighted by Theodore Cooley as follows: "William Tryon is an American landscape painter whose pictures are greatly sought for their delicacy of coloring and refinement of feeling. A pupil of Daubdigny, he is, like that artist, a painter of country life - the idyllic rusticity of apple trees in bloom, of waving cornfields, of shining valleys and streams rippling gently to the sea. He is especially fine in the silvery-gray atmosphere."

He went on to win the Carnegie Prize at the Carnegie Exhibition of 1908 at the Carnegie Museum of Art.

In addition to his painting, Tryon taught at Smith College from 1886 to 1923, visiting part-time to critique students' work and, late in his career, establishing the Tryon Gallery of Art. He died of cancer in South Dartmouth on July 1, 1925.

== Papers ==
Dwight William Tryon's papers can be found at the Freer Gallery of Art and Arthur M. Sackler Gallery Archives in Washington, D.C. Charles Lang Freer, founder of the Freer Gallery of Art, was a primary patron of Tryon. The collection includes correspondence, photographs, a sketchbook, and newspaper clippings.

== Works by Tryon ==
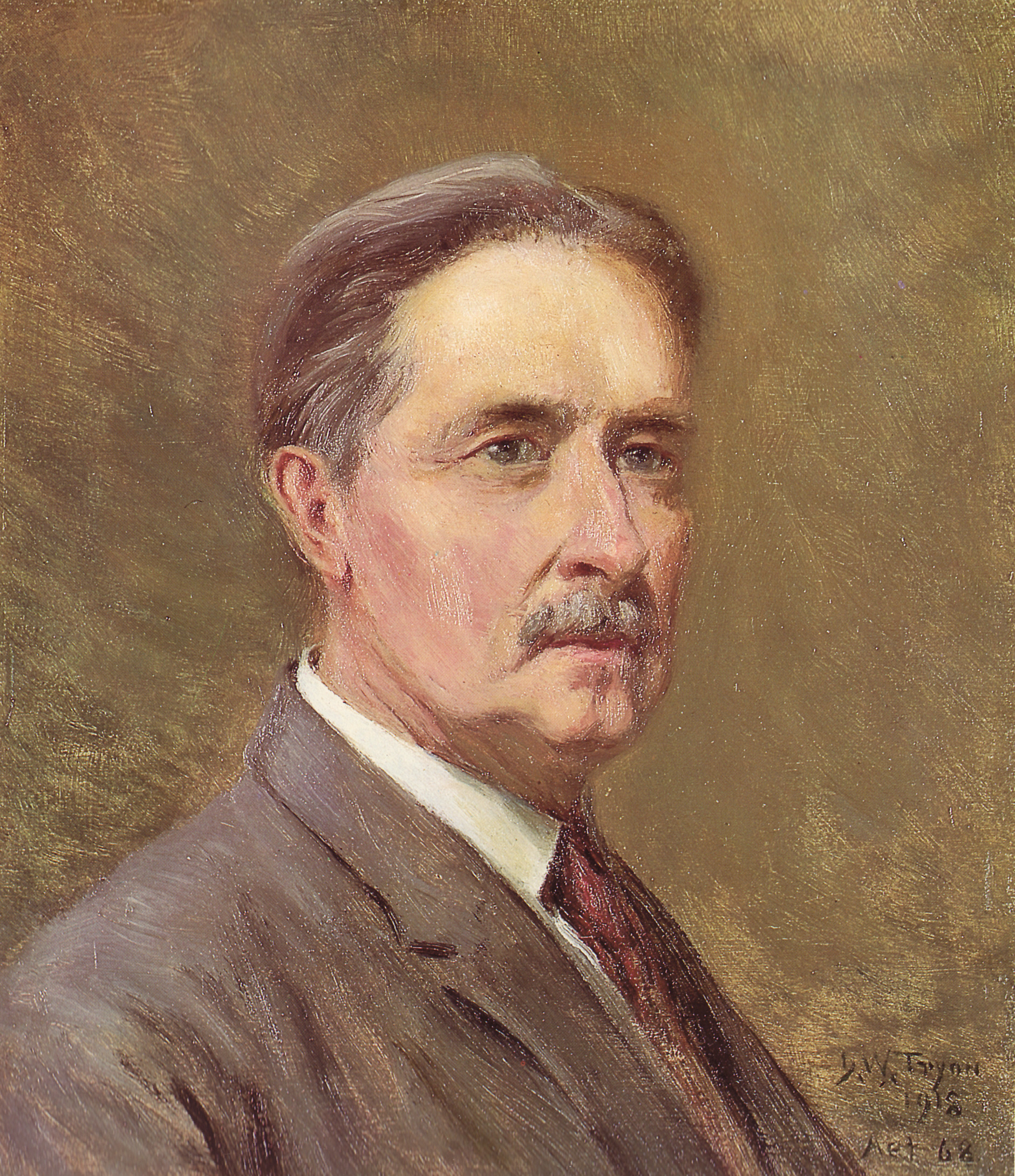
Self Portrait, 1918

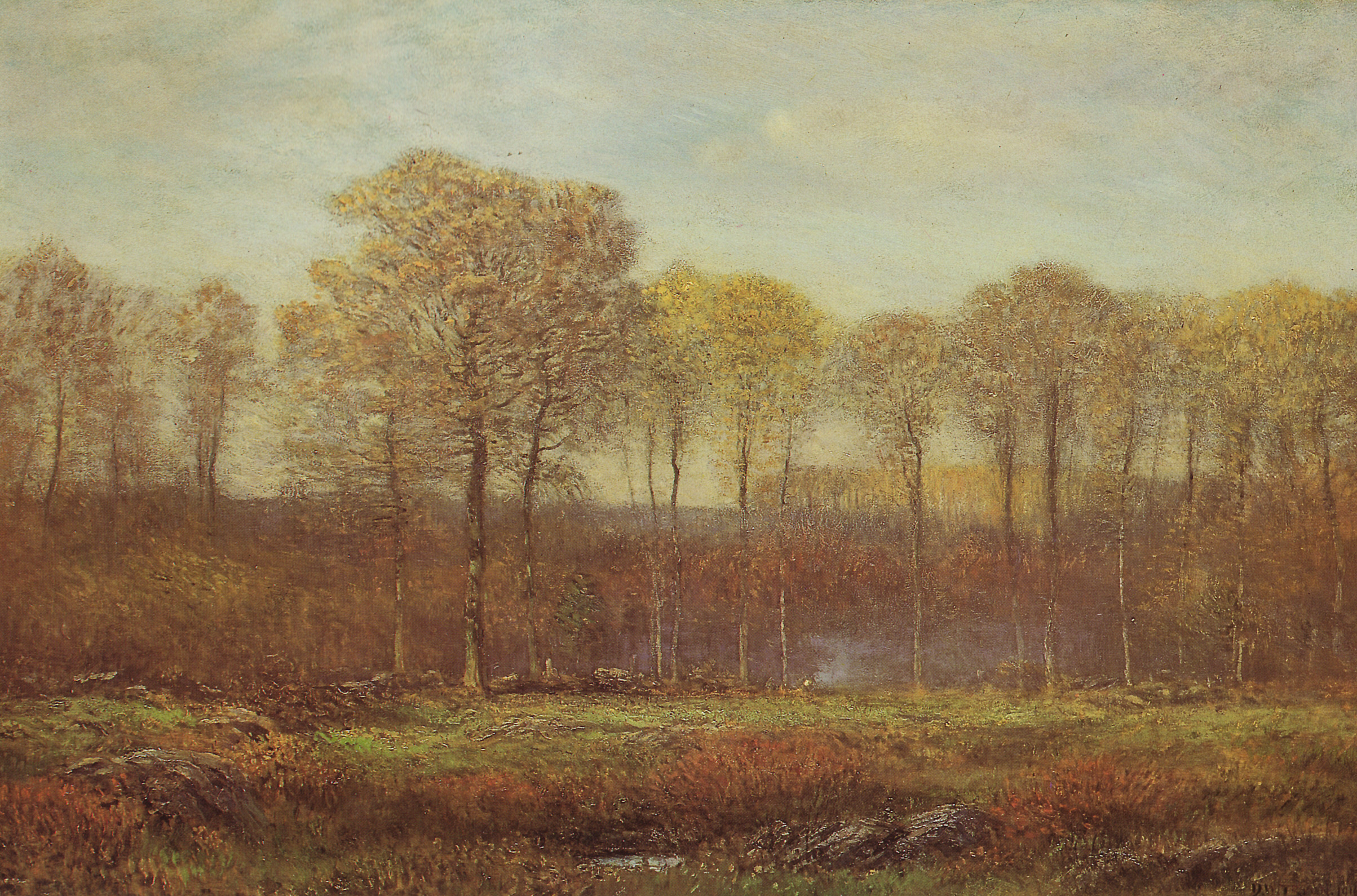
Autumn: New England

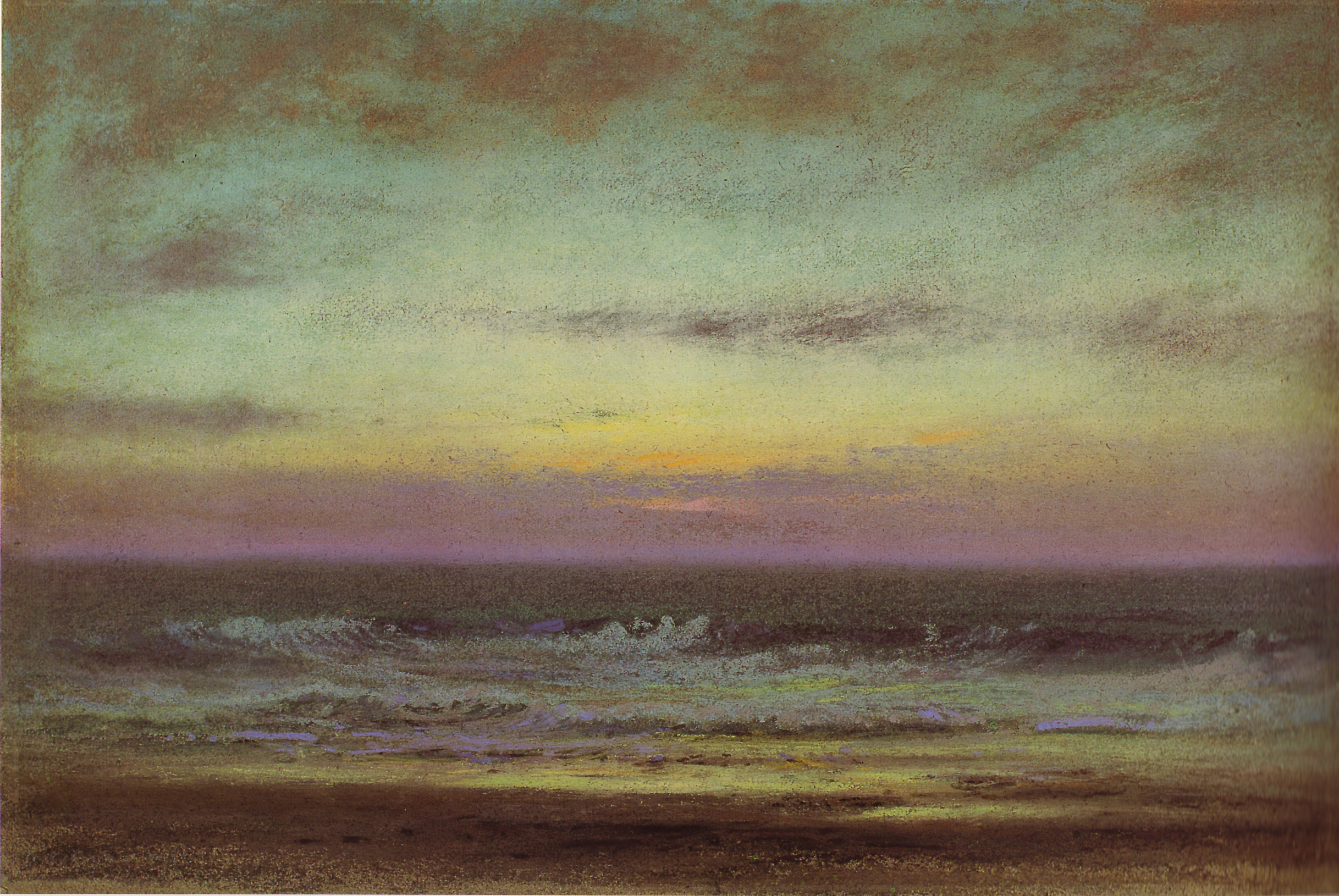
After Sunset: Looking East

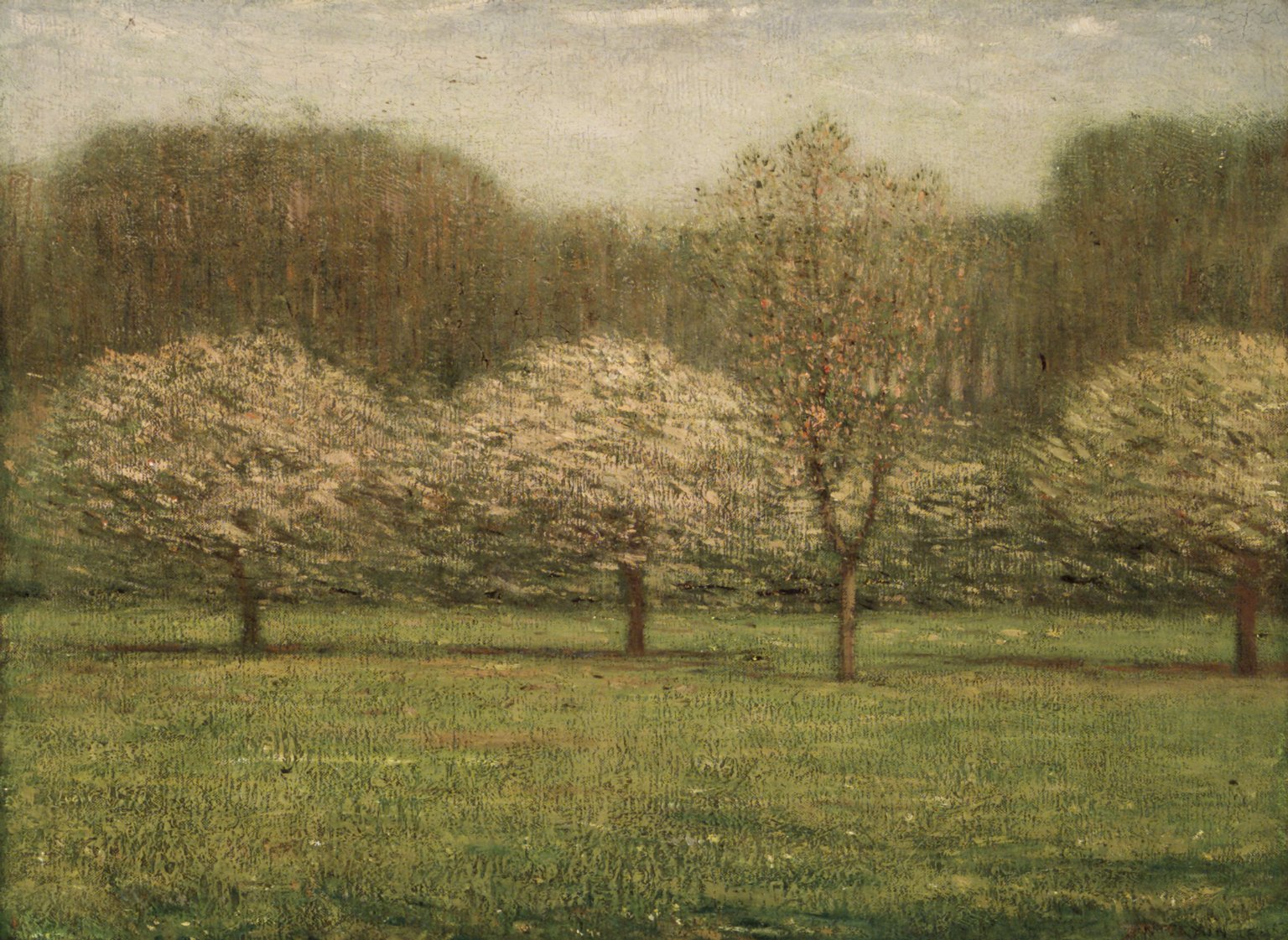
Apple Blossoms, Brooklyn Museum
- Glastonbury Meadows, 1881
- Cerney La Ville, 1881
- Landscape: A Lighted Village, 1887, Freer Gallery of Art, Washington, D.C. Awarded the 1887 Third Hallgarten Prize by the National Academy of Design.
- Early Morning, September, 1904

== Sources ==
- Merrill, Linda (1990). An Ideal Country: Paintings by Dwight William Tryon in the Freer Gallery of Art. Washington, DC: Smithsonian Institution. ISBN 0-87451-538-6.
- Sherman, Frederic Fairchild, American Painters of Yesterday and Today, 1919, Priv. print in New York. Chapter: The Landscape of Dwight W. Tyron
- Chisholm, Hugh, ed. (1911). "Tryon, Dwight William" . Encyclopædia Britannica. Vol. 27 (11th ed.). Cambridge University Press.
