= Dorian Allworthy =

American painter

- Born: Pennsylvania, USA
- Known for: Painting, Print making
- Movement: Realism, Tonalism, Representational

Dorian Allworthy is an American representational, tonal-realist painter working in Chicago. She is also known for her drypoint engravings. She specializes in large figure paintings as well as still life compositions and landscapes.

== Biography ==
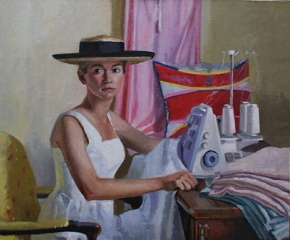
Dorian Allworthy. Holly O'Toole on the Serger. 1995. 30 X 36 inches. Oil on Canvas.

=== Early life and training ===
Dorian Allworthy was born in Pennsylvania. She attended an alternative high school in Philadelphia, and later studied at the Pennsylvania Academy of the Fine Arts. Her great uncle was mid twentieth century painter, Joseph Allworthy.

=== Career ===
Allworthy is a painter and printmaker of still lives, figures, and landscapes. Her work is held in public and private collections, including the Prints and Drawings collection of the Art Institute of Chicago.
