= Jules Turcas =

American painter

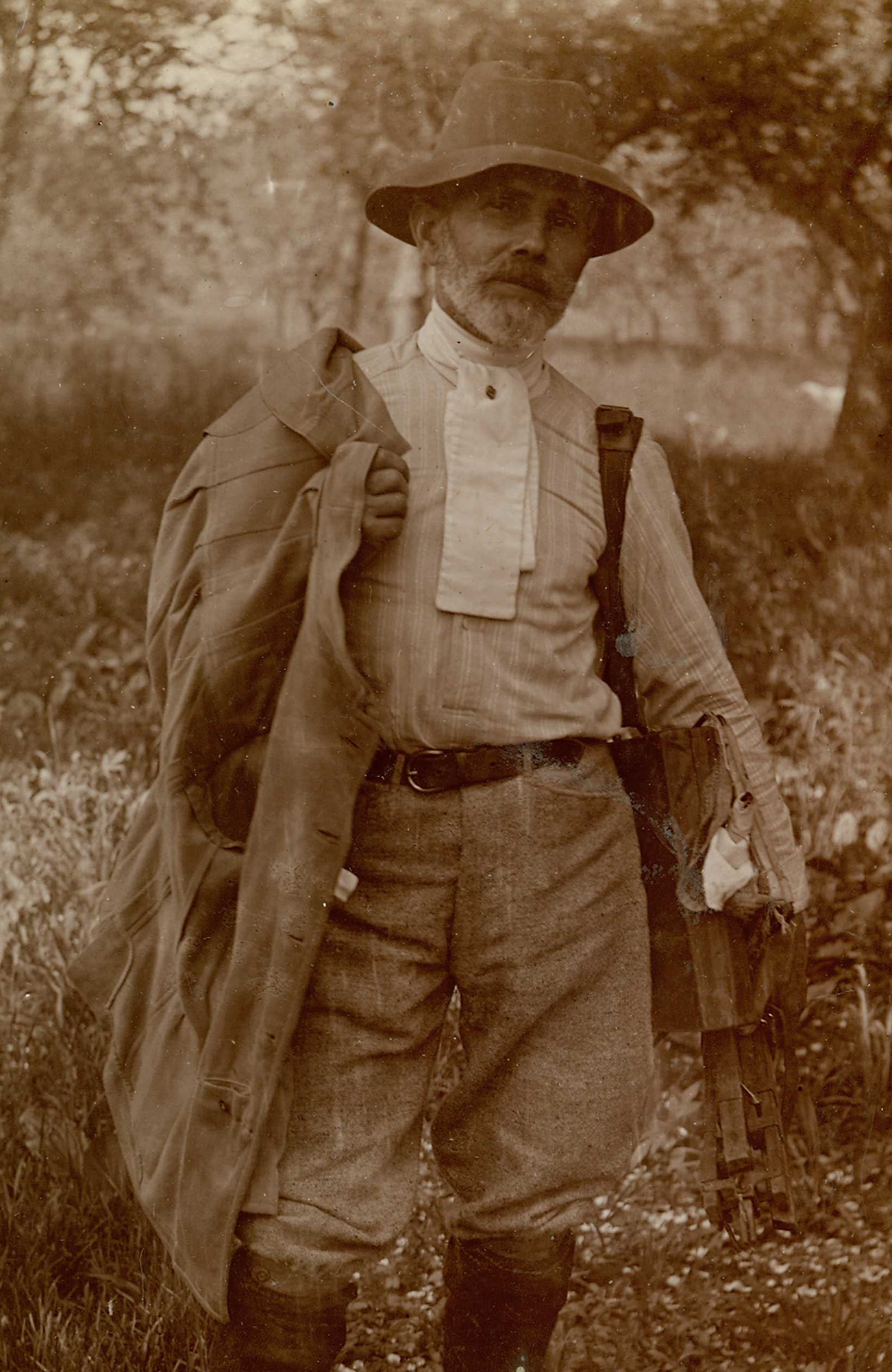
- Jules Turcas, c. 1915
- Born: Julius A. Turcas; March 15, 1851; Cuba
- Died: March 16, 1917 (aged 66); New York City
- Resting place: Fresh Pond Crematory, Fresh Pond, Queens

Jules Turcas (1851–1917) was an American artist known for the Tonalist style of his paintings. He exhibited widely in group shows held by prominent nonprofit organizations such as the National Academy of Design, the New York Watercolor Club, the Pennsylvania Academy, and the Society of American Artists. He was best known for the landscapes and rural scenes he painted in southern New England as a member of the Old Lyme art colony. Clements also made illustrations for books, popular magazines, and poster displays.

== Early life and training ==
Turcas was born in Cuba into a family with connections in New Orleans. Turcas is known to have, at some point, studied art in Germany.

== Career in art ==
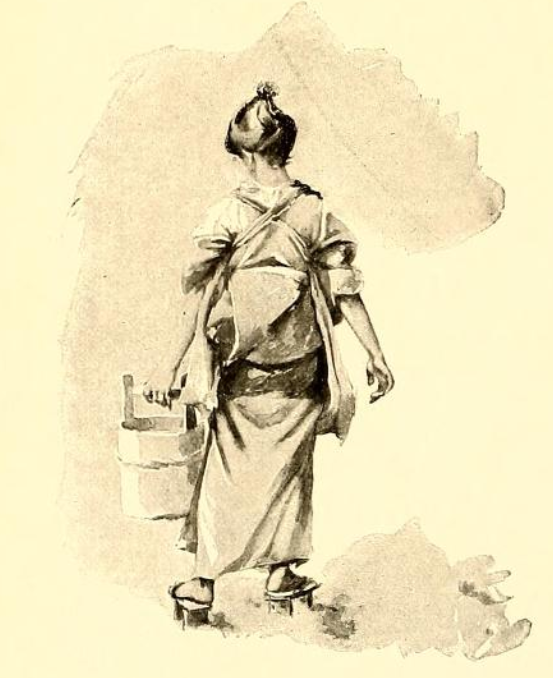
Jules Turcas, 1893, "Noshi and the Morning Glory", illustration, St Nicholas magazine

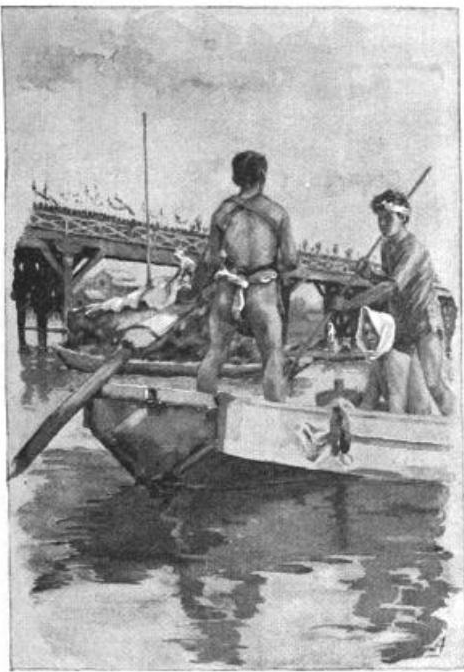
Jules Turcas, illustration, "A Japanese Venice", 1893, Harper's Weekly

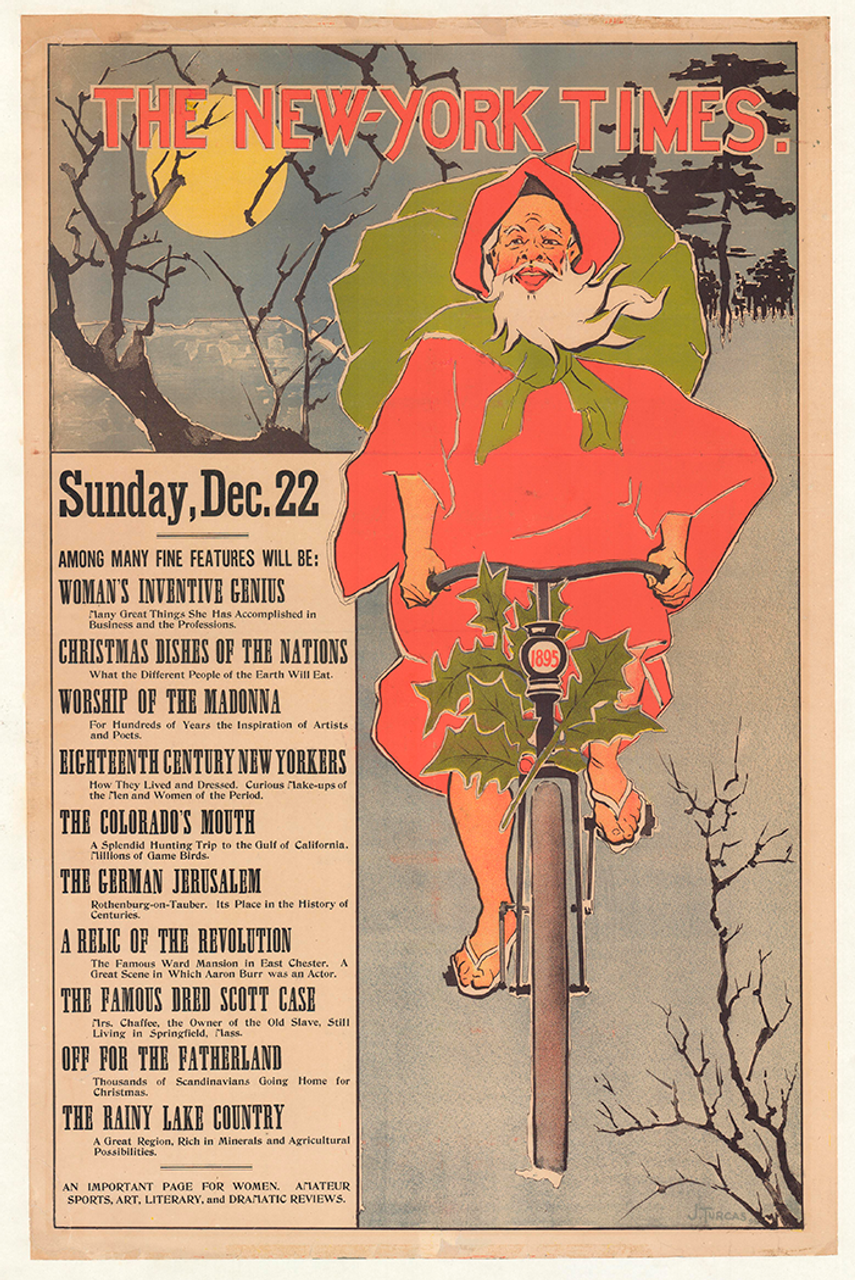
Jules Turcas, 1895, St. Nicholas Advertisement, poster, 19.5 x 30 inches

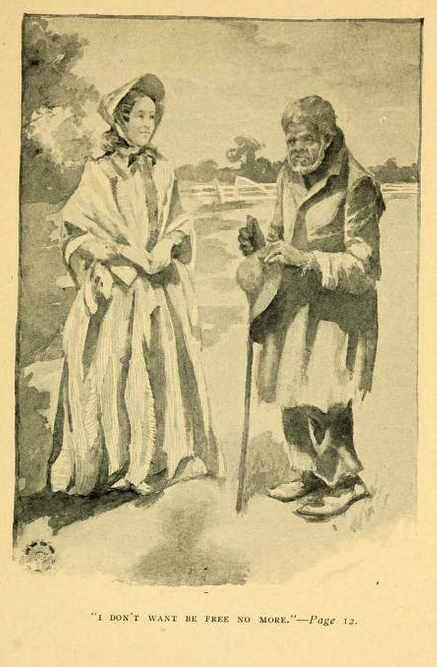
Jules Turcas, 1895, "Don't Want to Be Free", illustration, A Girl's Life in Virginia

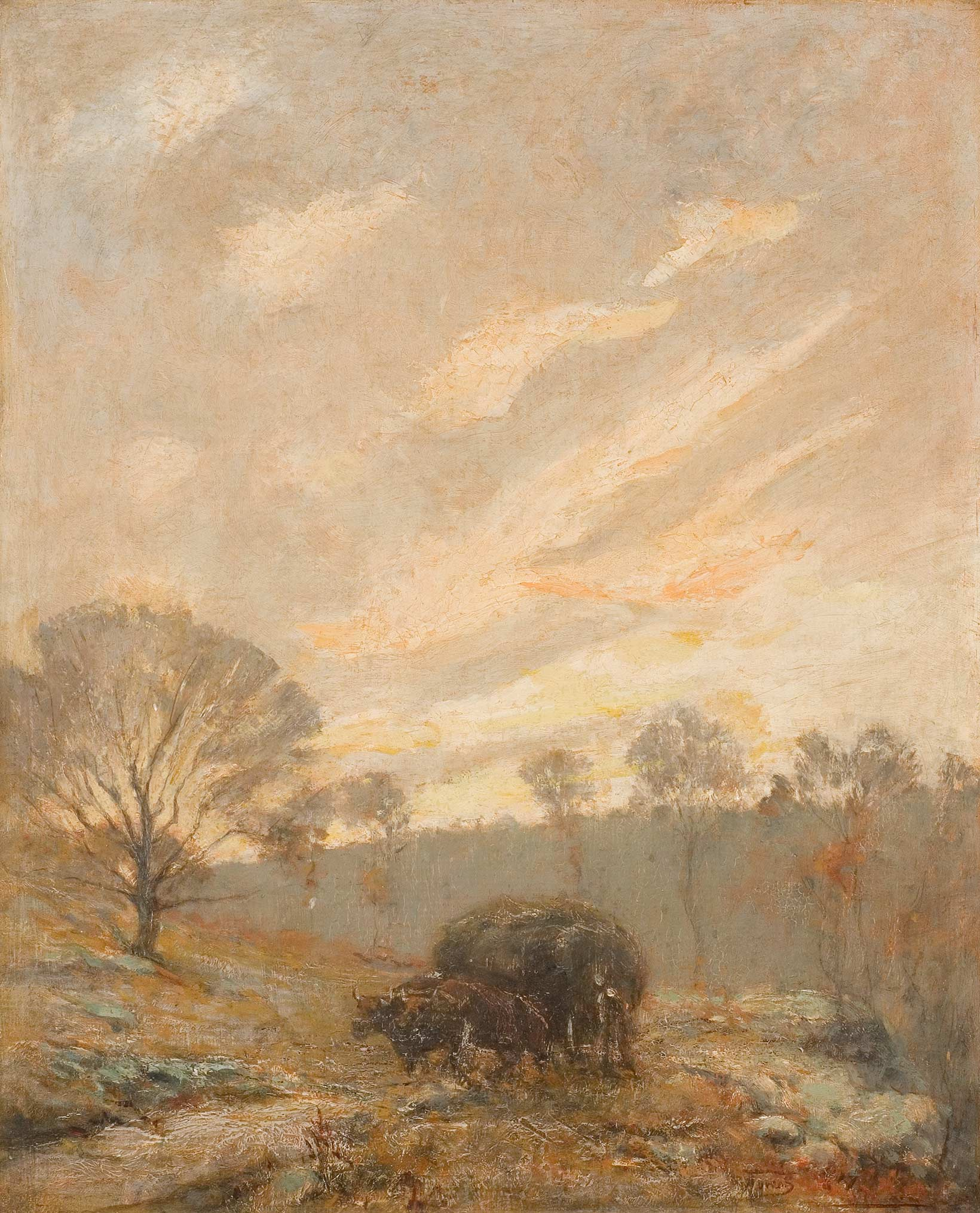
Jules Turcas, 1900-1917, "Landscape with Oxen", oil on board

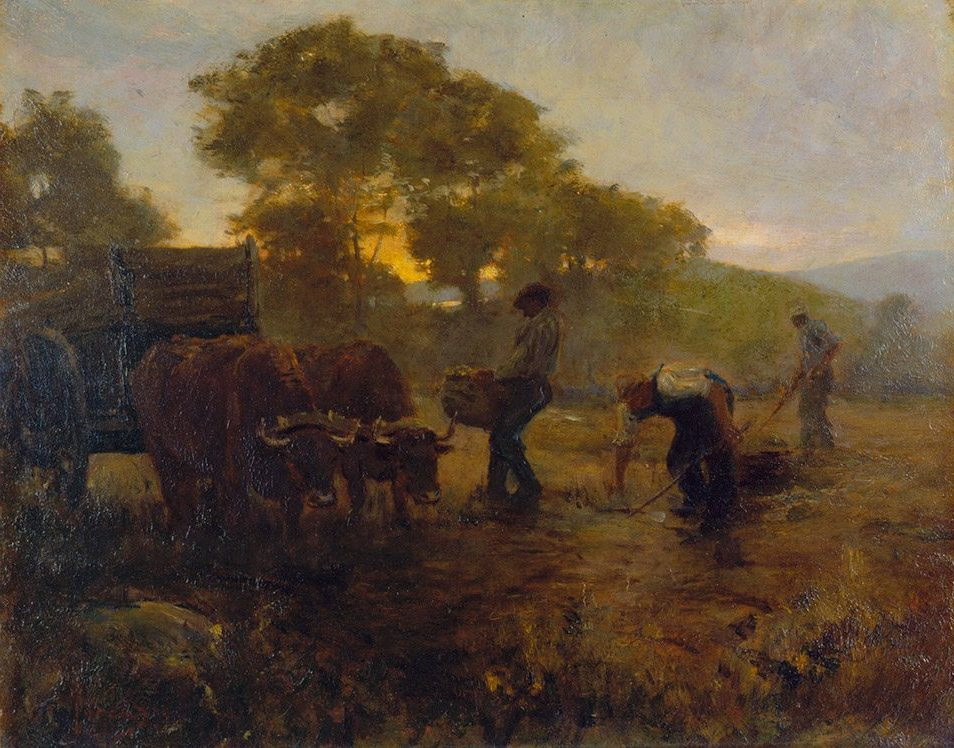
Jules Turcas, 1900-1917, "Potato Harvest", oil on board

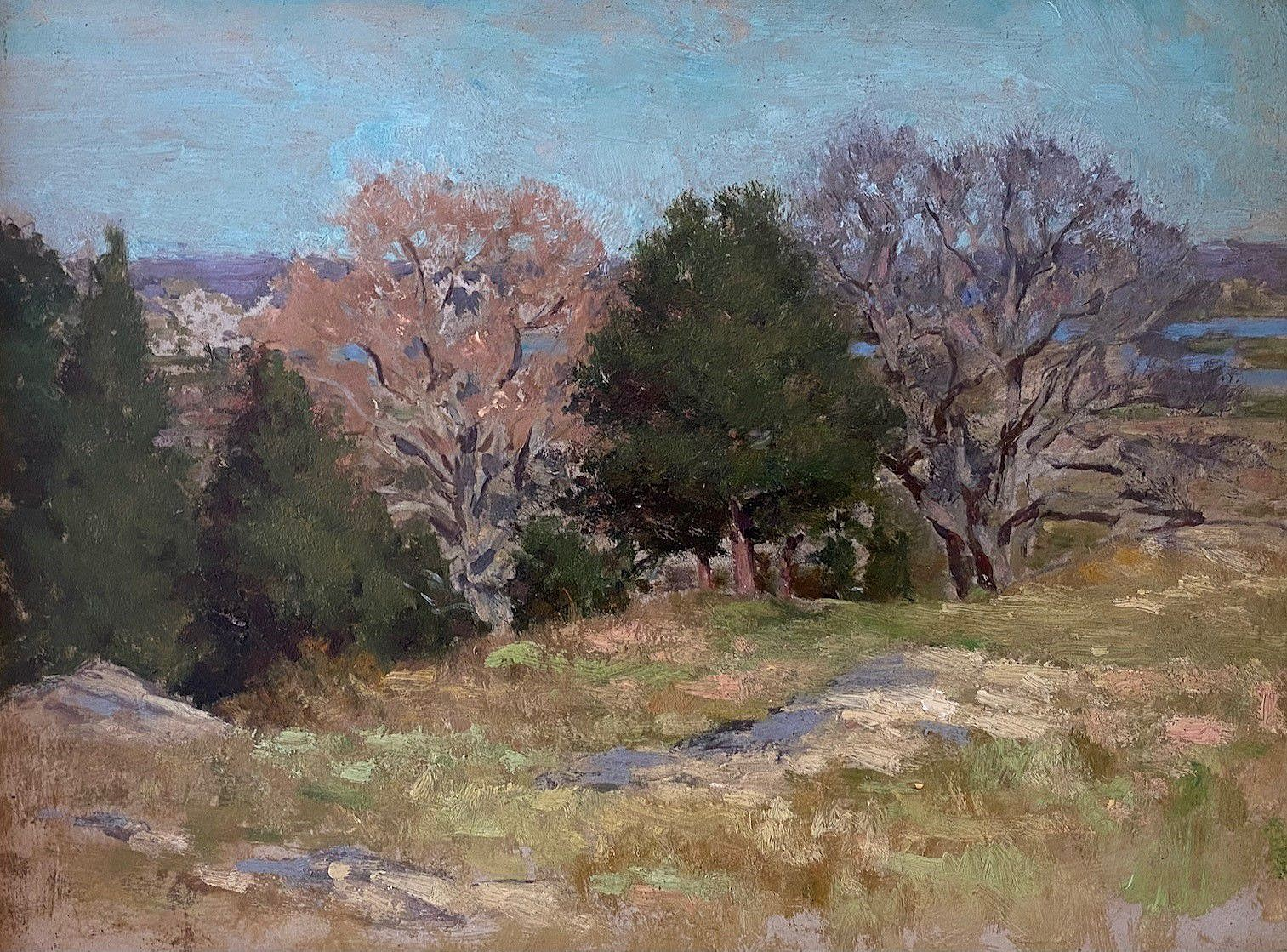
Jules Turcas, 1900-1917, "Old Lyme Hills", oil on board, 12 x 16 inches

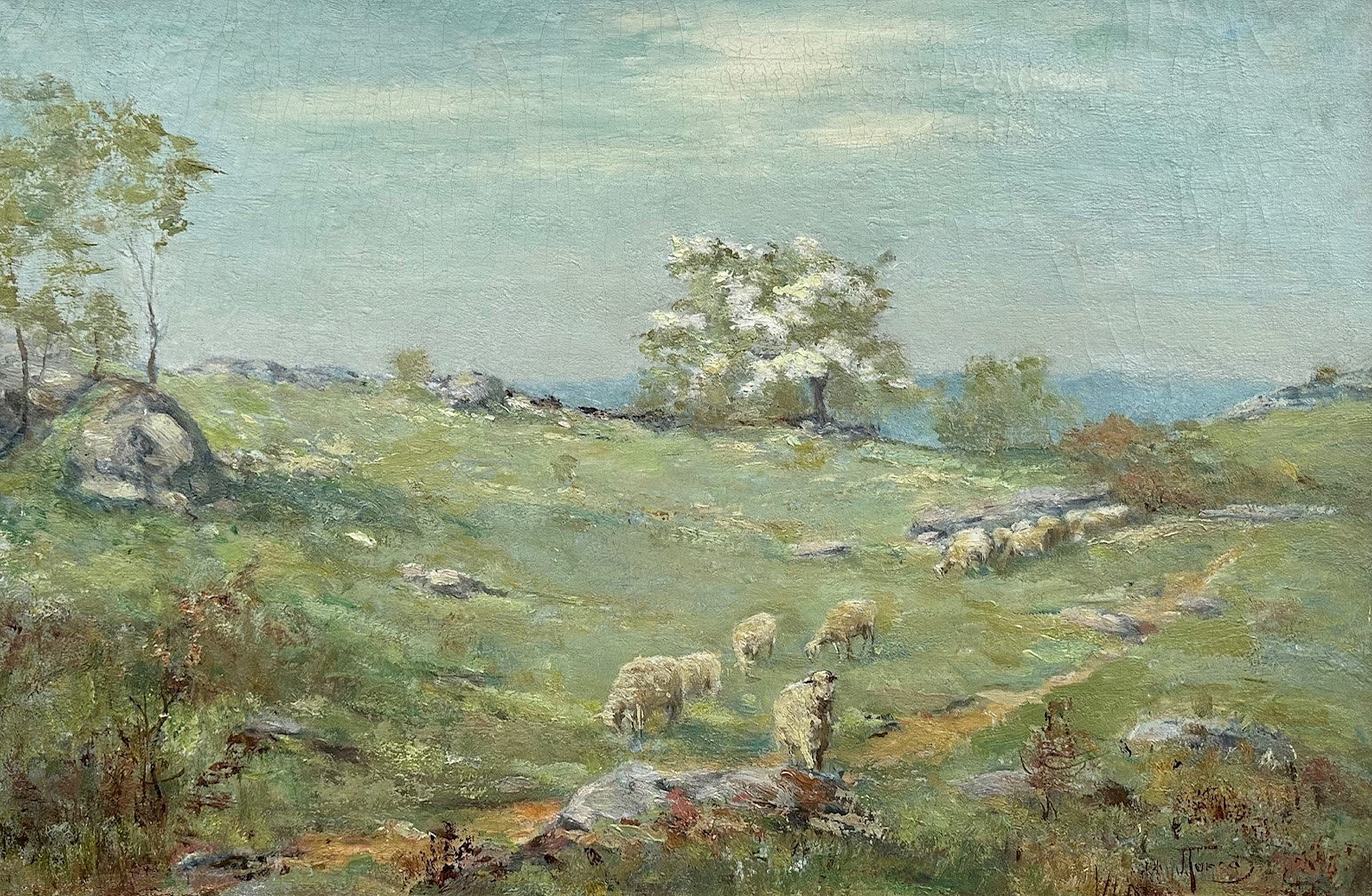
Jules Turcas, 1900-1917, "Sheep Meadow in Spring", oil on board, 16 x 24 inches

In 1881, Turcas was living in Brooklyn, New York, and had begun to establish himself as a yachtsman, angler, and professional illustrator. In July of that year, he fished and made sketches during a schooner cruise from Manhattan to Cape Cod and back. His companions were the editor of the New York Times and other prominent New Yorkers. Three years later, he joined another schooner expedition, this time down the west coast of Florida to the Keys. At about that time, he became a member of an informal dining club of fishing enthusiasts called the Ichthyophagi.

In 1890, Turcas illustrated a story that appeared in a popular semi-monthly magazine called Short Stories. The piece described a cynical and embittered artist who was transformed during a Christmas Eve dream. One of the small illustrations Turcas made shows a dream vision of one of the artist's models in his studio. In 1893 Turcas provided illustrations for two magazines. The first were published in St. Nicholas magazine accompanying a poem about a morning glory vine that became entwined around a water bucket. Translated from Japanese by Mary M. Scott, the verse was called "Noshi and the Morning Glory". Turcas's picture showed young Noshi with her bucket. The second, published in Harper's Weekly, accompanied an article about the canals and waterways of Tokyo. That year, he also made the title page illustration and other pictures for the Book-Lover's Almanac. One journalist said the illustrations revealed "an artist of real merit" who was sure to become better known, and another said his work was "happily conceived and in closest union with the subject matter". A year later, when Turcas illustrated a poem by Henry Bedlow in the New York Times, a reporter said the results showed a "vigorous and adroit pencil". When in 1895 Turcas made the cover illustration for the Easter number of The Art Interchange magazine, a reporter noted Japanese influence in his drawing and called it an "artistic and special" cover design. That year Turcas also contributed illustrations to a memoir of southern gentility called A Girl's Life in Virginia Before the War.

In the early 1890s, Turcas began to show works in major exhibitions. In 1893 he showed a landscape in the New York Watercolor Club's annual exhibition and a pastel of a young boy in a red tie at the annual exhibition in the National Academy. Reviewing the latter, a critic for the British Magazine of Art approved his commitment to method and praised his skill in drawing. In 1894, he showed a pastoral in the annual exhibition of the Pennsylvania Academy and an urban scene in the Water Color Club exhibition. Reviewing the latter, a critic for the New York Times noted a "simple sincerity" of workmanship that made the painting worth extended contemplation.

Between 1895 and 1905, Turcas continued to show in large, well-publicized exhibitions, including the American Watercolor Society (1900), Pan-American Exposition (1901), and Boston Art Club (1901). In 1902 he showed at the Worcester Art Museum, Union League Club, American Art Society, and Society of American Artists, He won medals at the Pan-American Exposition in 1901 and an American Art Society exhibition in 1902. Between 1904 and 1916, his work appeared in exhibitions held by the National Arts Club (1904), Pennsylvania Academy, Art Club of Philadelphia, Lewis and Clark Centennial Exposition (1905), National Academy (1906–1913), Corcoran Gallery (1907), and Allied Artists (1916).

Turcas was never represented by a private gallery and never held an independent exhibition. In 1912, he and George H. Clements appeared in a duo exhibition at New York's Century Club. Turcas contributed 40 canvases to the show. Reviewing it, a critic for the New York Times said that Turcas had a "special faculty for gaining charm of surface and texture from his pigment."

In the 1890s Turcas rented a studio in the Vandyke Studio Building on 8th Avenue near Columbus Circle in Manhattan. In August 1894, a fire that originated in his studio destroyed the upper floors of the building. He was not present at the time and lost a half-completed portrait to the blaze. In 1901 he joined with other artists in designing, constructing, and managing a cooperative studio apartment building at 27 West 67th Street, a few blocks north of the Vandyke. For extended periods Turcas served as either secretary or treasurer of the corporation that was formed to manage the building.

At the turn of the century, New York tonalists, led by Henry Ward Ranger, formed an art colony in Old Lyme, Connecticut near the Long Island Sound. During its first decade the group held exhibitions at a local library and in 1914 organized as the Lyme Art Association and began to raise funds for the purchase of its own gallery. In 1905 Turcas purchased a home in the village, and began exhibiting with the other artists who spent their summer months in Old Lyme. Reviewing paintings he exhibited there in 1907, a critic praised Turcas for his individuality and called attention to a "glowing" autumn landscape, "rich with color and strong in detail." After the outbreak of World War I, Turcas used his skill at illustration in an organization he formed with two other artists to promote American support for the Allies. On March 16, 1917, Turcas died of pneumonia at his home in the artists' 67th Street cooperative building he helped to build.

=== Artistic style and critical reception ===
Turcas was principally a landscape artist who, along with other tonalists, favored cool palettes and soft brush strokes in painting bucolic twilight and autumn scenes. This style, like that of the other tonalists, took its origin from the 19th-century Barbizon School. Regarding this connection, a New York Times critic saw strong Barbizon influence in one of his paintings but said, "His style has a more personal accent, and his farm workers somehow seem more real than the French peasants transplanted to New England in so many paintings by his contemporaries." After Turcas died, a fellow artist, Charles Vezin, wrote, "His art was strong, reserved, quiet, noble, and will survive the fashions of manner, technique, and subject, and will live when no one is left who knew his soul incorporate."

== Personal life and family ==
Turcas was born on March 15, 1851, in Cuba. Early records give his name as Julius A. Turcas. (Note: Two early passport applications and two sets of records concerning his father's estate give this name.) His father was Jacques Leon Turcas (1814–1872), a New Orleans-born plantation owner who went by the name Leon. His mother was Catherine Sammos Turcas (died 1873).

His father's family came from France and lived in Cuba. During the 19th century, they owned coffee plantations worked by slaves in the eastern part of the island. They were in New Orleans at the time of his father's birth thus giving Turcas American citizenship. His parents moved from Cuba to New York following the Cuban revolution of the 1860s. His father died in 1872 in that city and his mother died a year later when the ocean liner on which she was traveling collided with an iron-clad sailing ship.

He had two siblings, a sister, Catherine, and a brother, Leonce. Catherine was traveling to her wedding in Paris when she died with her mother on board the Ville de Havre in 1873. Leonce also died in 1873. He was visiting Cuba at the time, working on details connected with the settlement of his father's estate.

In 1881, when he was 30, Turcas made sketches on a fishing expedition from New York to Cape Cod and return. (Note: Led by John Foord, editor of the New York Times, and including a half dozen prominent New Yorkers, the fishing expedition took place in July 1881. Like the other participants, Turcas was a member of a fishing club that held annual banquets called "The Ichthyophagous Dinner")

Turcas married Ella Dallett in 1896. She was the daughter of a shipping magnate named John Dallett. Although little is known about her career, she was an artist who exhibited landscape paintings early in the 20th century. Born in 1865, she outlived Turcas by 24 years, and was still living in their studio apartment on 67th Street when she died in 1941. In 1899 they had a daughter whom they named Antoinette. She married in 1924 and died in 1968.

Turcas died of pneumonia on March 16, 1917, while at home in his studio apartment on West 67th Street in Manhattan.
