= Joseph Allworthy =

American painter (1892–1991)

- Born: 19 September 1892; Pittsburgh, Pennsylvania
- Died: 17 August 1991 (aged 98); Chicago, Illinois
- Known for: Painting
- Movement: Realism, Tonalism, Representational

Joseph Allworthy (September 19, 1892 – August 17, 1991) was a prominent mid-twentieth-century American representational, tonal-realist painter based in Chicago, known for his still life compositions and portraits. He also did notable work in the field of commercial art and advertisements.

== Biography ==
=== Early life and training ===
Allworthy was born in Pittsburgh, Pennsylvania, on September 19, 1892, to parents of German descent. He came from a family of artists. His grandfather and granduncles painted murals and frescoes in Catholic churches after the American Civil War. His father was a decorator and illustrator who assisted in the adorning of the walls and ceilings of the Congressional Library at Washington. Joseph Allworthy got his initial training under his father and at the age of 14 worked as an errand-boy in the art department of RR Donnelley. He began his formal artistic studies at the Art Institute of Chicago, but never graduated and went on to study at the 'Grand Central' in New York. Like all aspiring American artists of the time, he headed to Europe, but had to leave with the outbreak of the First World War.

It was in Madrid at el Museo del Prado that Allworthy had an epiphanic experience that left an indelible mark on him as a painter – he discovered Diego Velázquez, whom he viewed as 'natural and eternal as nature itself'. After the War, Allworthy returned to Paris wanting to study under the late-Impressionist painter Jean-Paul Laurens, who was then a professor at the École des Beaux-Arts and Académie Julian. It is uncertain how long or for that matter whether he ever studied under Laurens, as Laurens died in March 1921. Duriung his visit in 1926–27 he said "I was fortunate enough to study with a man who by means not revealed to me inherited the thinking that was Chardin's, Corot's and Manet's. From that time on, my work went steadily forward in goodness and quality. Today there is no one that I know of anywhere in our world who is interested in this great heritage." This was the Australian painter Max Meldrum, later known for his "tonal style" of painting. He studied under Meldrum and adopted his techniques and theory of art.

=== Career ===
Joseph Allworthy established himself as a prominent painter excelling in still life compositions. In 1931 a critic had this to say of him: "Joseph Allworthy is a young Chicago painter whose ability to paint an exquisite and flawless still life has won him great admiration. There are still life arrangements here which will add to his glamorous reputation and there are a few portraits of considerable charm..." Like other artists of his kind, Allworthy also painted portraits. Allworthy began to progressively focus more on portraits, so much so, in 1960 a critic referred to him as "a distinguished portrait painter." Although he also painted landscapes he never considered it as his métier, but did them as a part of his investigations into his theory of vision and painting. Allworthy's work became significant in the middle of the 20th century when decades after the Armory Show in New York introduced modern art to America, Allworthy focused on keeping the tradition of tonal, representational art alive in the mid-1900s. In an Arts Club of Chicago show in 1958, a critic noted, "It is a happy break for visitors who have been shown almost nothing but the most extreme nonrepresentational art in show after show of foreign painting all year in this gallery. Joseph Allworthy's portrait is done with the old time skill of a Sargent."

==== Still life ====
Allworthy, "whose paintings of still life are practically perfect," first gained attention of the art world in the early 1930s with his still life arrangements, and he continued to paint them even after his focus had shifted to other forms. His still life paintings are today scattered all over the U.S., Canada and Mexico in various museums and private collections.

==== Portrait ====
Allworthy's favorite subject was the human figure and his heroes were the great masters of portraiture: Velázquez, Rembrandt, Corot and Henry Raeburn. His ultimate reputation, rested as the preeminent portrait painter of the American Midwest in the middle of the 20th century. As his skill in this genre grew and drew attention, it overtook his existent reputation as a still life painter. As a critic noted "Joseph Allworthy lives up to his reputation in a brilliant, smooth still life and surpasses it in a portrait of a model in gypsy dress." He was sought after to paint official portraits by prominent men and women, in the realms of education, industry and politics, in the Midwest. Portraits by him now hang in major universities, colleges and industrial houses.

The subjects of Allworthy's portraits are a veritable who's who of the American Midwest of the mid-century. They included Drug manufacturer Eli Lilly (industrialist), Banker Walter J. Cummings, Boeing Chairman, William E. Boeing, the brewers Pabst brothers, the chairman of the board of trustees of the University of Chicago Laird Bell and many others associated with several universities across the United States. He painted the official portrait of Adlai Stevenson for his 1952 presidential bid and later his sister's too. His portrait work also extended into the international political arena, painting many diplomats and foreign leaders. But perhaps the largest collection of his portraits – 28 of them – is of the cattle barons of the Midwest. These are portraits of men in the livestock industry and were hung in the celebrated quarters of the Saddle and Sirloin Club of the Stockyards Inn until it was demolished and now hang in the rebuilt club in Louisville, Kentucky.

==== Landscapes ====
Although Allworthy, of necessity, continued to paint landscapes all through his career, he never considered it his métier and he rarely exhibited them. The scores of landscapes he painted were more directed toward his studies of vision and theory of painting and they form a veritable itinerary of his worldwide travels.

==== Commercial art ====
A little known side of Allworthy's career, but which nonetheless had considerable significance for him, was his work as a commercial artist. He was proud of his skills in lettering, design, layout, typography and commercial paintings and was much sought after for them. He even earned a comfortable living out of it. He had accounts with General Motors, Carnation milk, Goodyear Tire and Rubber Company, Pabst Brewing Company, Swift & Company and Florsheim Shoe. What characterized his works was that whether he painted sliced ham, a bottle of beer, a pair of shoes or a Buick sedan, he saw them as works of art – as still life compositions.

== Theory of vision and painting ==
Allworthy was an artist who deeply contemplated on the nature of his art. Profoundly influenced by the great past masters Velázquez and Rembrandt, and more immediately by his teacher Max Meldrum, Allworthy tried to develop further the latter's theory of vision and painting. He contended visual sensations are interpreted with the aid of one's past experience of other pictures or nature. Beauty, ugliness, order, confusion are visual properties, indisputable verities that are the same for all viewers allowing of no dispute. But because of personal likes and dislikes not all are capable of unprejudiced vision. Hence, the true recognition of these qualities is essential for a painter engaged in using them to bring about a definite objective through their employment. He termed this skill "detached or unprejudiced vision" and one painter more than anyone else embodied it for him – Velázquez.

== Personal life ==
In 1916 he married Grace Geymer. The two were lifelong traveling companions. They visited most European cities and the galleries to study the old masters first hand. In 1922 they bought a townhouse in the Gold Coast in Chicago, where the couple spent the rest of their lives – on its third floor was Joseph's studio. Grace was the subject of many portraits by Allworthy.

== Legacy ==
Allworthy never considered himself a teacher. In the summer of 1934, The American Academy of Art announced that "Joseph Allworthy, well known Chicago painter of portraits and still life, will teach a class in painting in their evening school. Mr. Allworthy has had a number of invitations to teach in schools throughout the country, but this is the first time he has yielded to the temptation." And again, in the summer of 1942, the Saugatuck Summer Art School had the privilege of him serving as the instructor in charge, announcing that "Joseph Allworthy is an outstanding painter! The opportunity of working with him is one not to be lightly dismissed." These are the only two known instances where he has imparted instruction. At the twilight of his career in the late 1970s he not only bequeathed his studio to his grand-niece and adopted daughter Dorian Allworthy, but also imparted the secrets of his art to her. The studio to this day preserves not only his memory but also his heritage, as Dorian Allworthy continues to perpetuate his legacy.
