= Pakatakan Artists Colony Historic District =

Historic district in New York, United States

- U.S. National Register of Historic Places
- U.S. Historic district
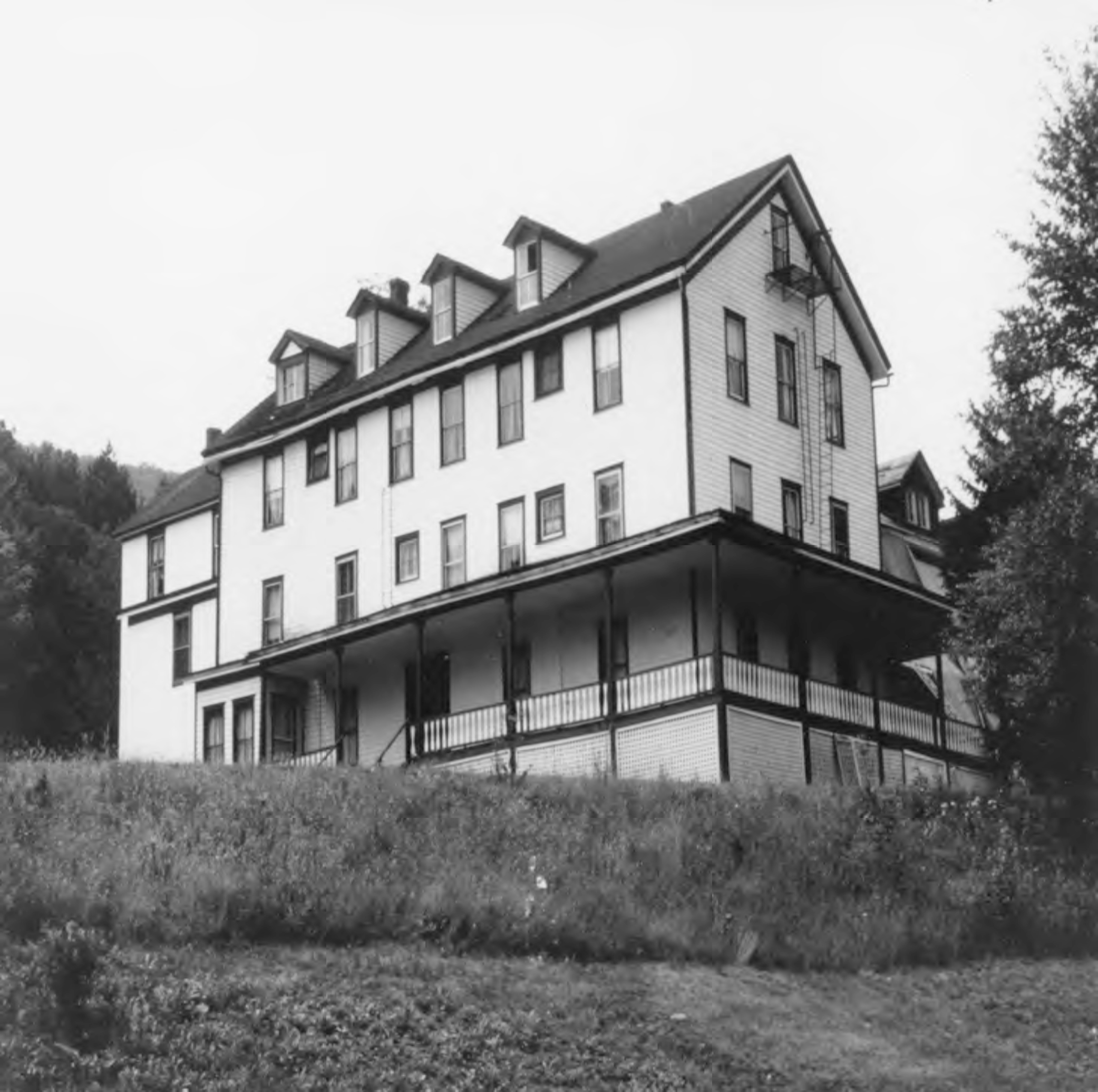
- Hoffman House (Pakatakan Lodge)

- Location within New York Location within the United States
- Location: NY 28 at jct. with Dry Brook Rd., Arkville, New York
- Coordinates: 42°8′33″N 74°37′30″W
- Area: 65 acres (26 ha)
- Built: 1886
- Architectural style: Shingle Style
- NRHP reference No.: 89000046
- Added to NRHP: February 21, 1989

Pakatakan Artists Colony Historic District is a national historic district located at Arkville in Delaware County, New York. The district contains 33 contributing buildings and two contributing structures built between 1886 and the 1960s. It consists of a small mountainside collection of studios and residences clustered about the original Pakatakan Lodge. It is an extremely well preserved collection of unusual Shingle Style and other wood frame seasonal buildings.

It was listed on the National Register of Historic Places in 1989.

== History ==
The name "Pakatakan" is the name of the mountain near the colony. It is believed to mean "meeting of the waters" from the Tuscarora peoples. Arkville was one of the earliest settlements in the area, originating at the beginning of the 19th century. The 1870s were the beginning of tourism in the Catskills and hotels were built along the Ulster and Delaware railroad.

In 1886, the first structure of the Pakatakan Artists Colony was built, the Hoffman House. The Hoffman House was initiated through John Francis Murphy's persuasion of local businessman Peter F. Hoffman to build a hotel to cater to artists. The artists who came to the Hoffman House included Alexander Helwig Wyant, George Smillie, Parker Mann (1852–1918) and Edward Loyal Field (1856–1914). These artists were associated with the Catskill Mountain School of landscape artists whose distinct style was distinct from their predecessor, Hudson River School.

== Architecture ==
The original buildings were built between 1886 and 1930 and are primarily shingled or novelty styled with simile design and limited ornamentation. Common features include shingled sides, steeply pitched roofs, overhanging unboxed eaves, and brick fireplaces. They are incorporated harmoniously on the landscape. The studio buildings largely have large, multi-pane windows to provide views of the landscape and the interior space primarily devoted to a large, high-ceiling room.

== Gallery ==
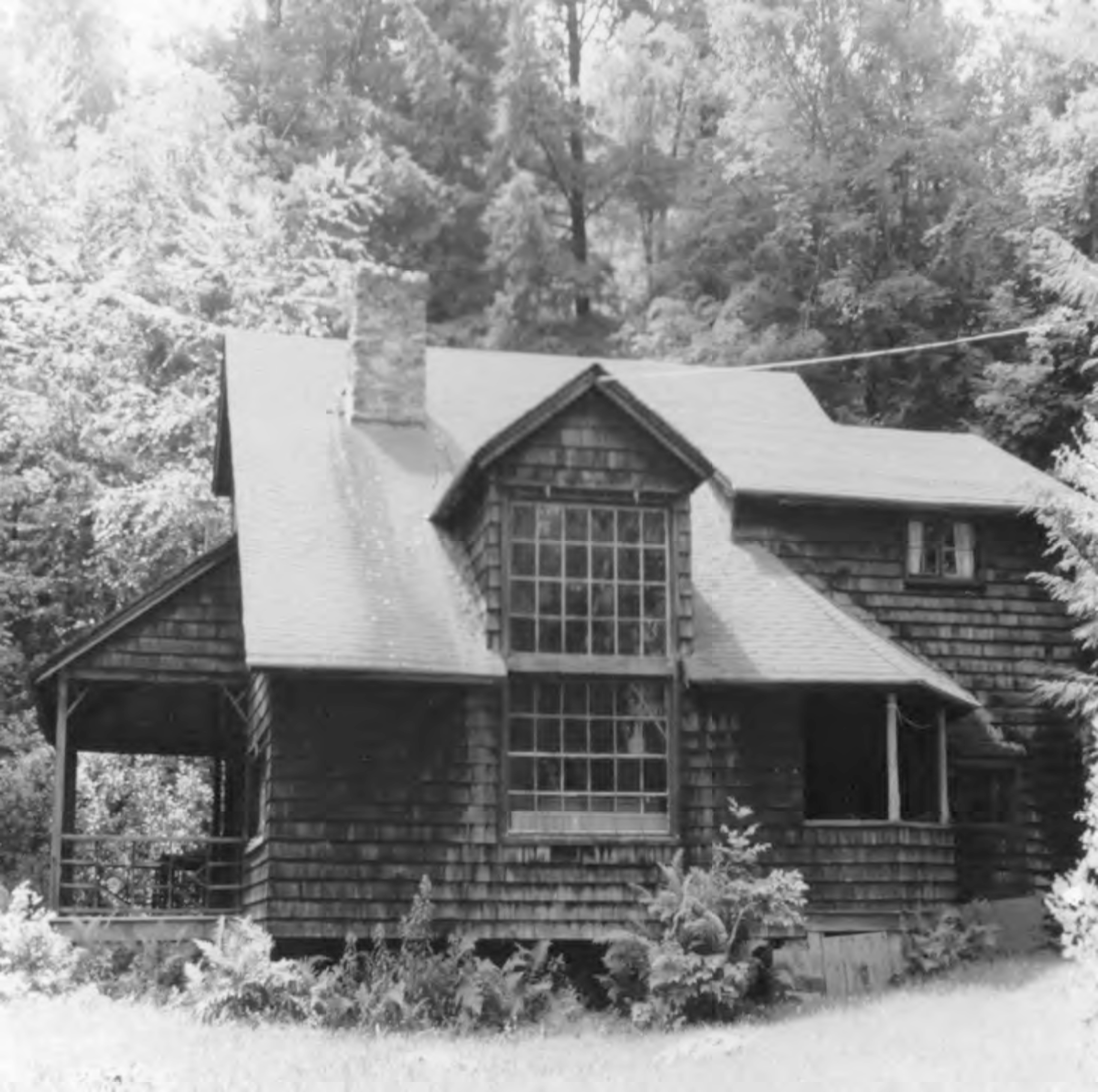
Field Studio

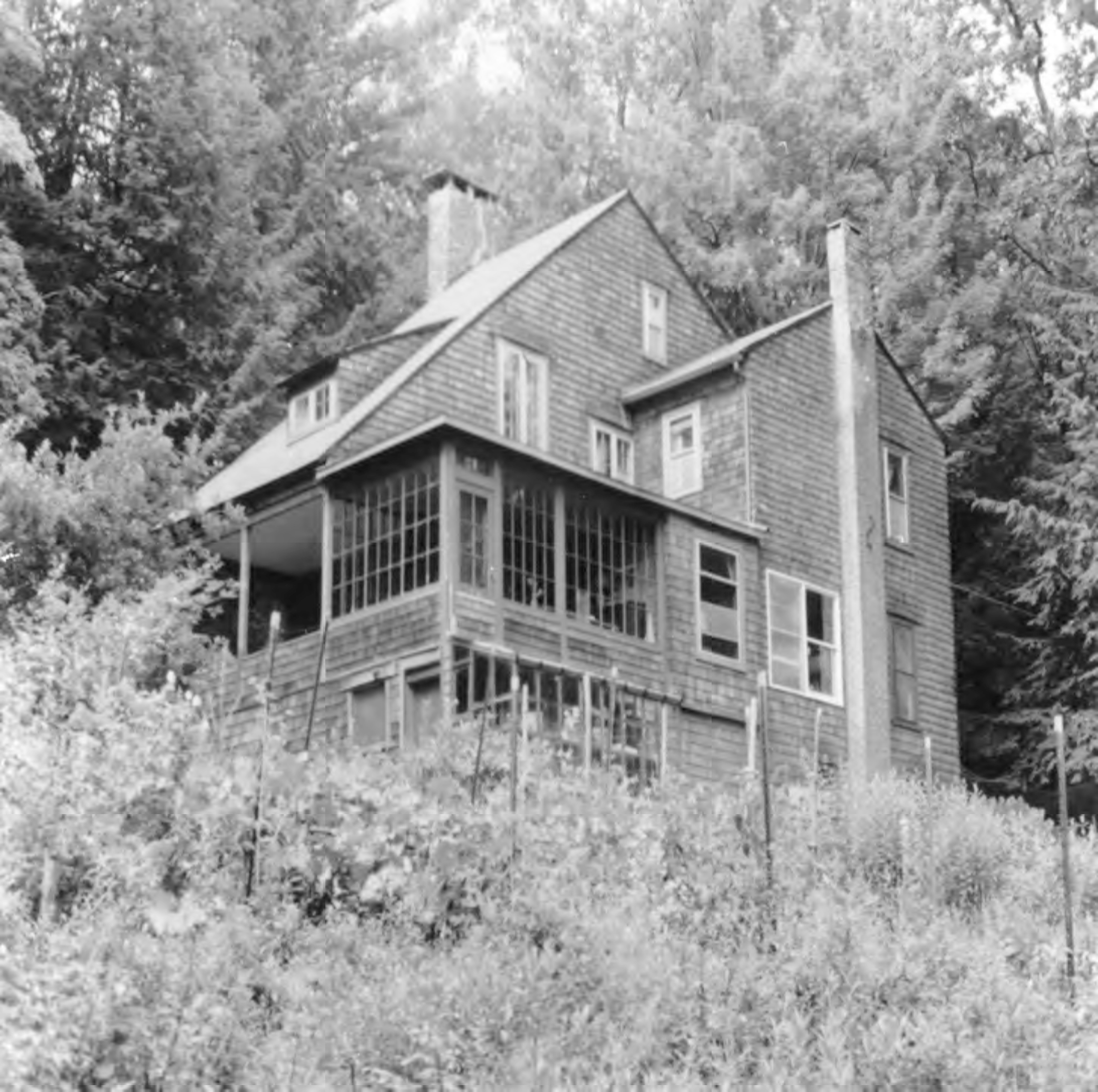
Murphy Residence

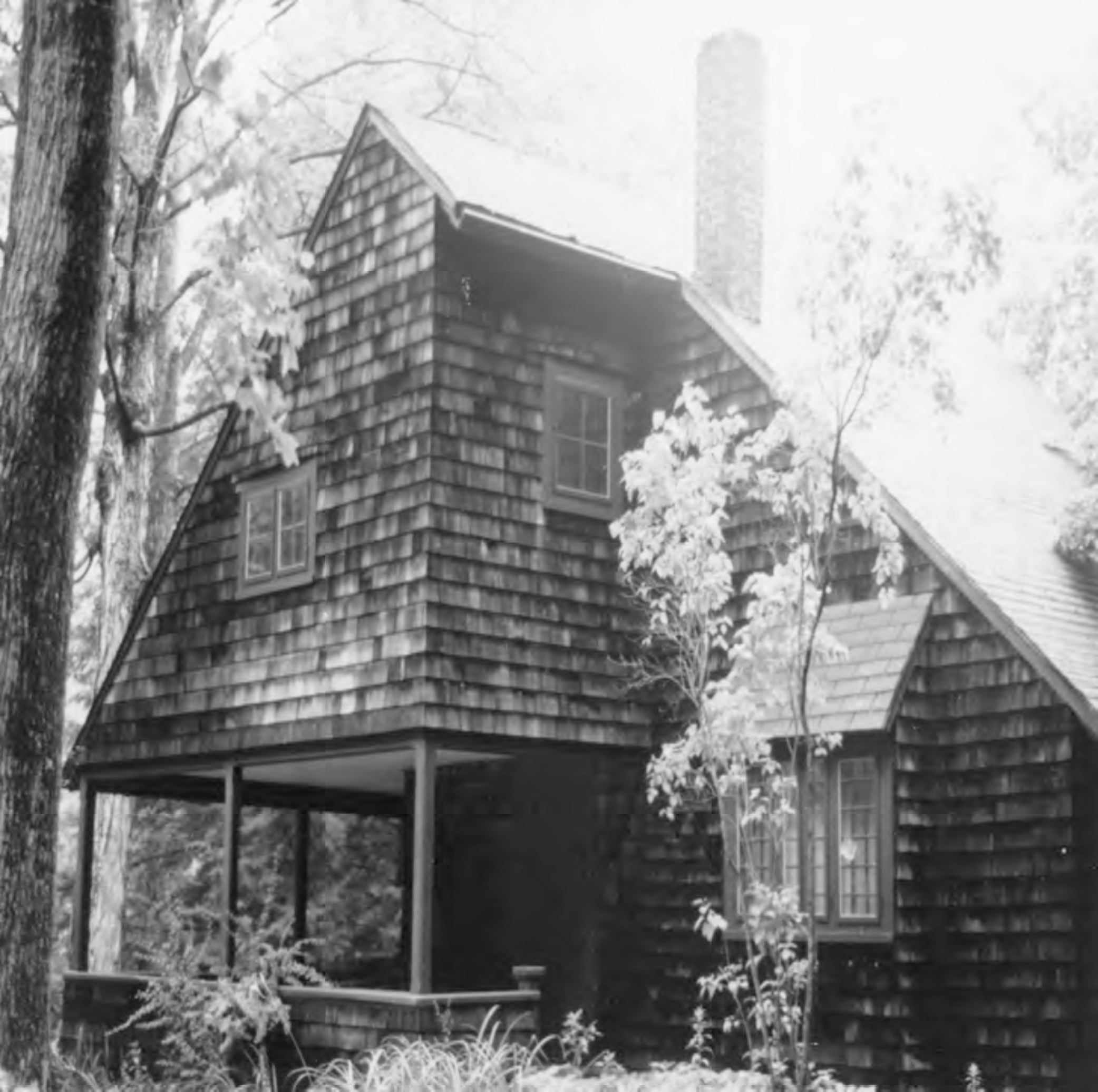
Upper Studio

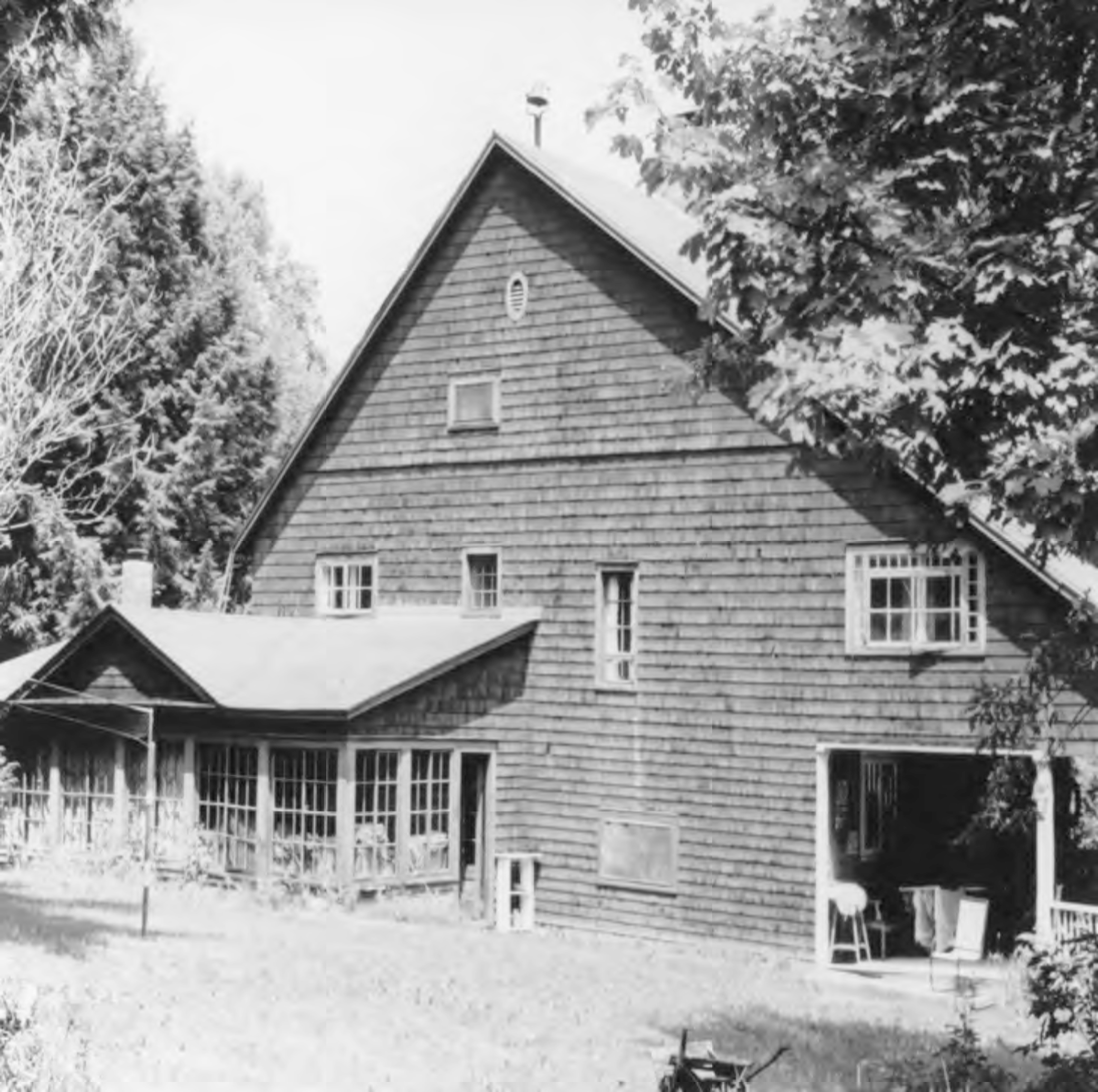
Wyant Studio

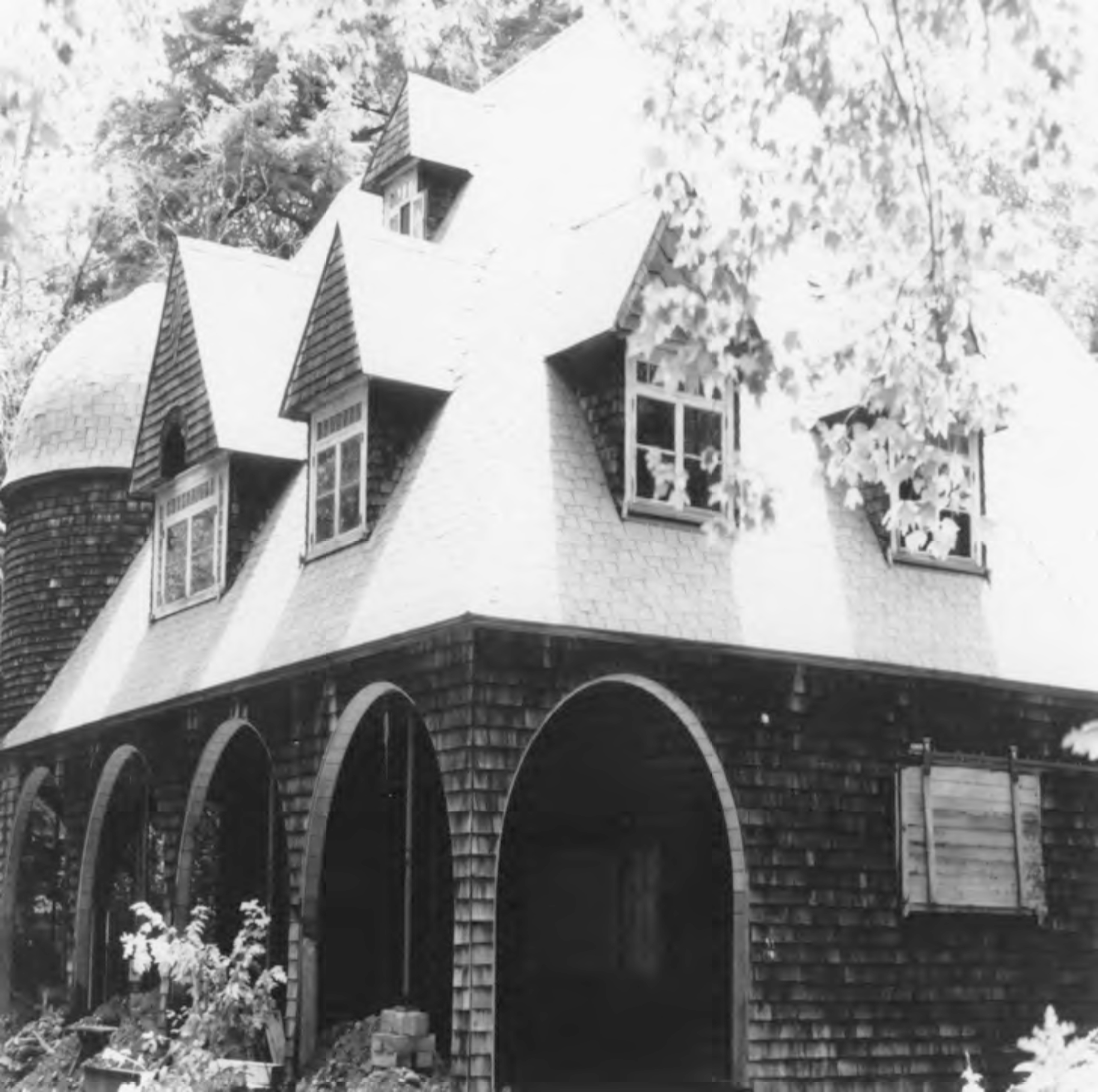
Locke House

== See also ==
- National Register of Historic Places listings in Delaware County, New York
