= John Francis Murphy =

American painter (1853–1921)

- John Francis Murphy, circa 1920
- Born: December 11, 1853; Oswego, New York
- Died: January 30, 1921 (aged 67)
- Known for: Landscape painting
- Style: Tonalism

John Francis Murphy (December 11, 1853 – January 30, 1921) was an American landscape painter. His style moved from poetic Tonalism to the innovative application of multiple layers of pigment, in order to create a sparse, brooding landscape, later in his career.

== Biography ==
John Francis Murphy was born at Oswego, New York on December 11, 1853. His father, Martin Francis Murphy (1822-1899) had immigrated from Waterford to Oswego where he married Hannah Gregory (1839-1899). In 1870, he moved to Chicago and became a sign painter. After being dismissed from his job, Murphy moved to New York City where he taught himself painting, in 1875. In 1887, he built a studio in Arkville, New York and founded the Pakatakan Artist Colony.

He first exhibited at the National Academy of Design in 1876, and was made an associate in 1885 and a full academician two years later. He became a member of the Society of American Artists in 1901 and of the American Watercolor Society. At first influenced by Wyant and Inness, after 1900 he attacked the modern problems of light and air, thus combining the old and new theories of landscape painting. He received numerous awards, including a gold medal at Charleston in 1902 and the Inness medal in 1910.

He died on January 30, 1921, of pneumonia in New York City.

== Gallery ==
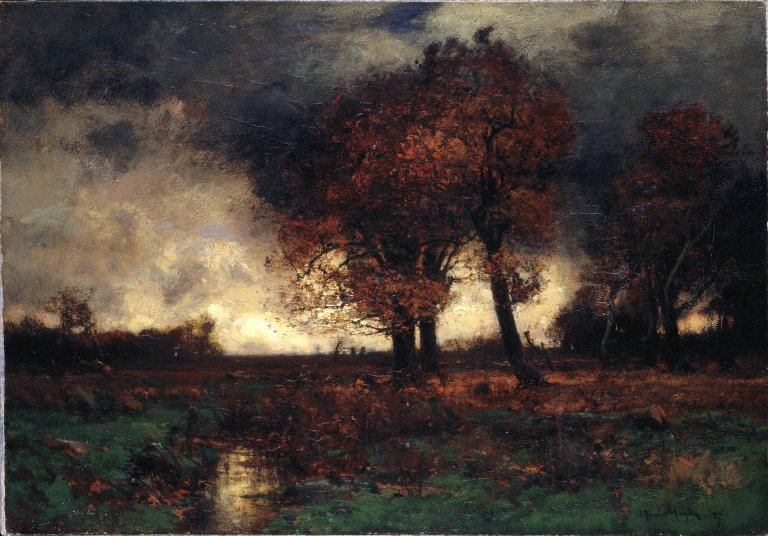
A Stormy Day - Brooklyn Museum

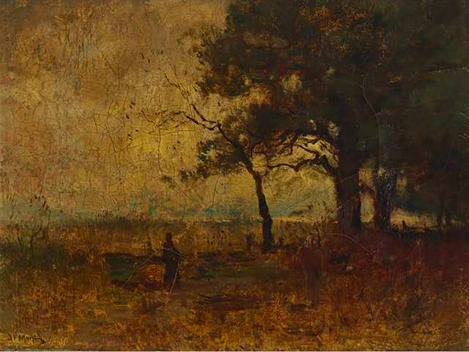
Figure Standing in a Field

== Works ==
Representative examples of his work are:

- October (Corcoran Gallery of Art, Washington)
- The Path to the Village (National Gallery of Art, Washington)
- Indian Summer (National Gallery of Art, Washington)
- Indian Summer Oaks, 1887 (Cahoon Museum of American Art, Cotuit, Massachusetts)
- The Old Barn (Metropolitan Museum, New York)
- The Hill Top (Art Institute of Chicago)
- Afternoon Lights on the Hills (Carnegie Institute, Pittsburgh)
- Neglected Lands (Buffalo Academy)
- Twilight
- Late September
- Golden Autumn (National Cowboy & Western Heritage Museum, Oklahoma City)
- The River Farm
- Tints of a Vanished Past, awarded the 1885 Second Hallgarten Prize by the National Academy of Design.
- Golden Autumn, 1898 (Salmagundi Club, New York)

== Sources ==
- Cahoon Museum of American Art: https://web.archive.org/web/20120326172806/http://www.cahoonmuseum.org/american-impressionism.php
- Sherman, Frederic Fairchild, American Painters of Yesterday and Today, 1919, Priv. print in New York. Chapter: Miniature landscapes by J. Francis Murphy: https://archive.org/stream/americanpainters00sheriala#page/n17/mode/2up
