= Alexander Helwig Wyant =

American painter

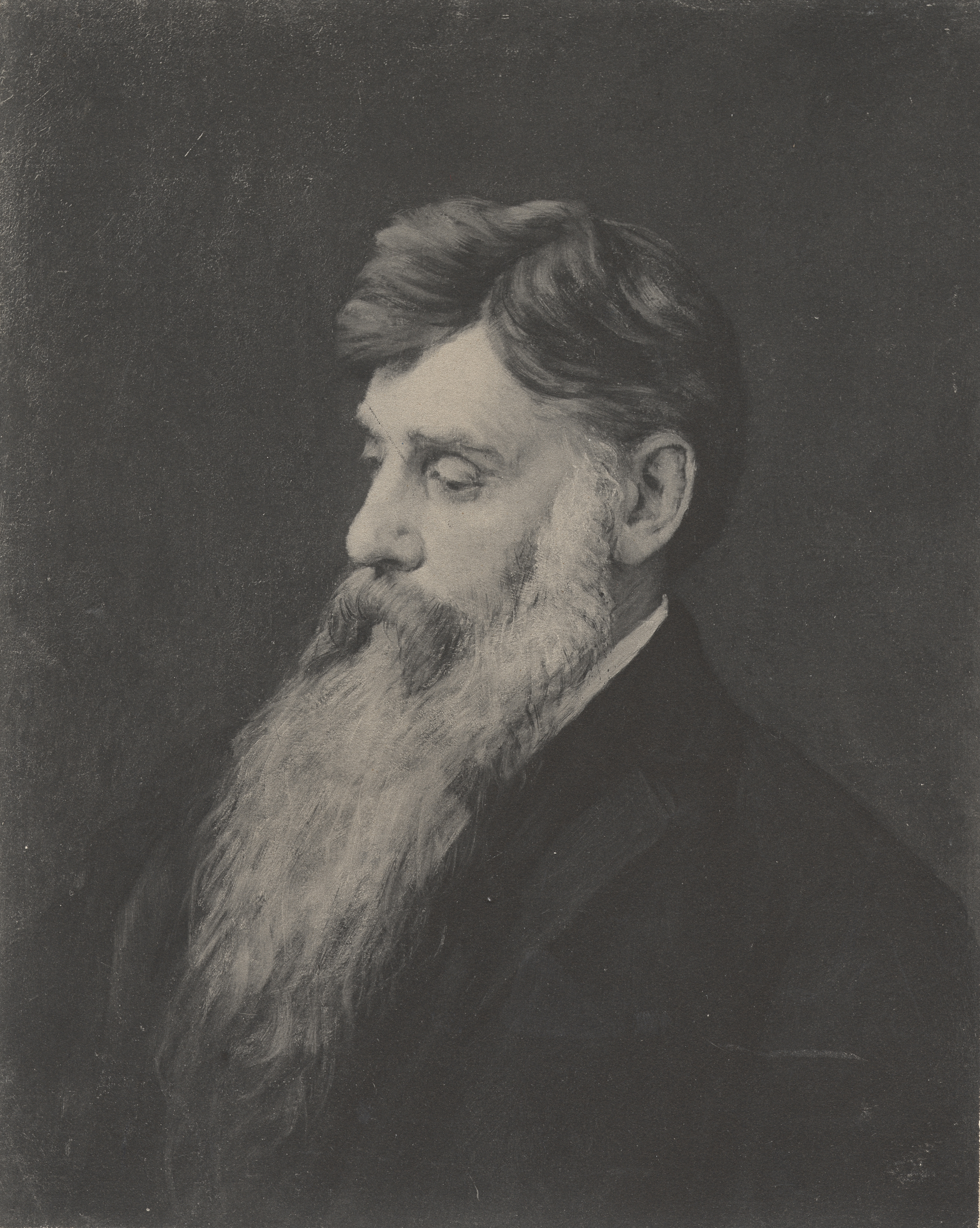
- Alexander H. Wyant
- Born: January 11, 1836; Port Washington, Ohio, U.S.
- Died: November 29, 1892 (aged 56)
- Known for: Landscape art, Painting
- Movement: Tonalism

Alexander Helwig Wyant (January 11, 1836 – November 29, 1892) was an American landscape painter. His early works belonged to the Hudson River School, with its direct pastoral narrative, but evolved into the more moody and shadowy Tonalism. After a stroke which paralysed his right arm, he taught himself to paint with his left.

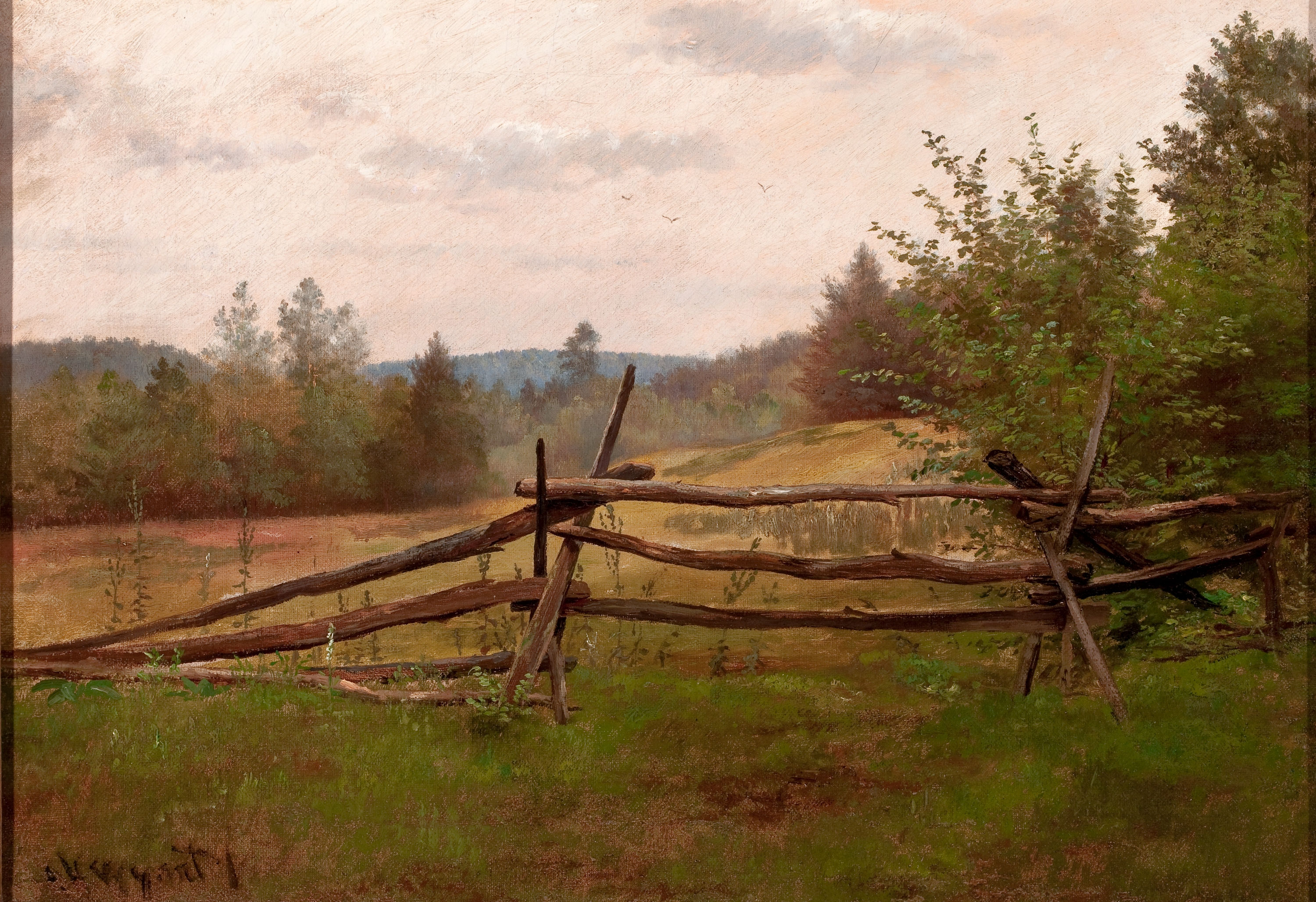
Split Rail Fence

== Biography ==
Alexander Wyant was born at Port Washington, Ohio. He started painting beside the Ohio River when he was in Cincinnati, Ohio. A landscape painter in the style of George Inness, whom he later met in New York City. His early paintings followed closely the Hudson River School tradition, while the later—infused with low-key colors, atmospheric features and poetic interpretation—are representative of tonalism.

Raised in Defiance, Ohio, Alexander H. Wyant worked during his teens as a sign painter in nearby Port Washington. In 1857 he was impressed with some paintings by George Inness at an exhibition in Cincinnati and soon left for New York to meet Inness. After returning to Cincinnati, Wyant secured the support of Nicholas Longworth and went to study in New York in 1860. He went on a trip that started in Paris in 1860 where he saw Corot and Dupré's works before moving on to Germany.

After an interlude of two years in Cincinnati, he moved back to New York City in 1863. He exhibited for the first time at the National Academy of Design in 1864 and was elected an associate there in 1868 and an academician in 1869. Wyant went abroad in 1865, studying for a few months with the Norwegian painter Hans Gude in Düsseldorf and Karlsruhe, Germany, and making brief stops in England and Ireland before settling again in New York. After 1866 Wyant gradually shifted toward a more fluid handling of paint, with increasing reliance on a palette emphasizing shades of white, gray, and the earth colors. From 1867 he exhibited his watercolors almost annually and was instrumental in the founding of the American Watercolor Society in 1878.

A partial stroke while on a government expedition to Arizona and New Mexico in 1873 led to paralysis of his right arm. Between 1874 and 1880 he worked in his studio in New York City, teaching himself to paint with his left hand. After his marriage in 1880 to his student, Arabella Locke, he began to spend most of his time in Keene Valley, New York. He moved in 1889 to Arkville, New York (in the Catskills). He frequently painted in the Adirondacks as well as in the Catskills. He died in 1892 in New York City shortly after completing Arkville Autumn Landscape, his last painting. He was only moderately appreciated during his lifetime, though after his death his works were eagerly sought for.

== Career ==
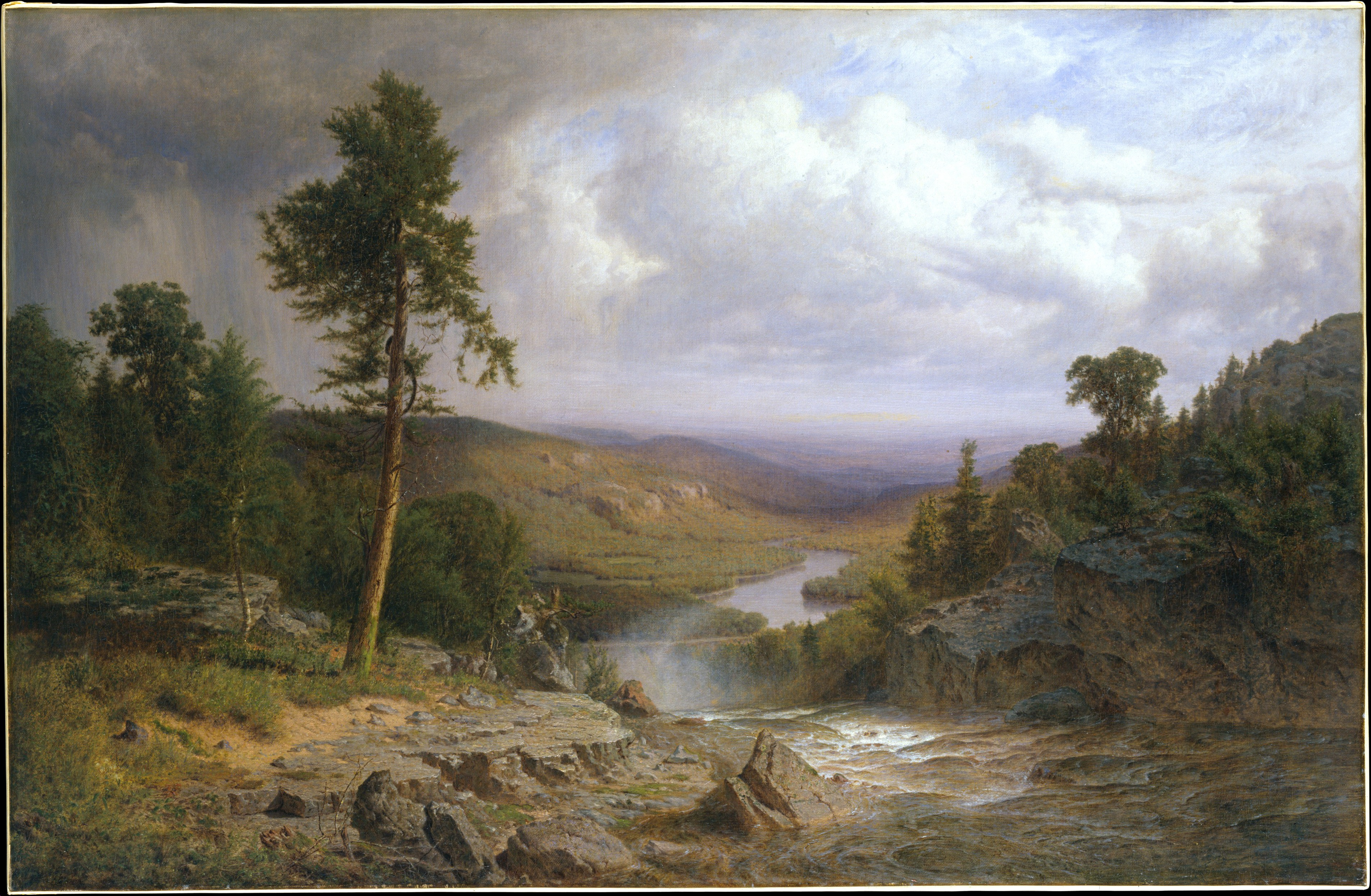
Tennessee, Alexander H. Wyant, Metropolitan Museum of Art

Wyant's signature style was developed slowly and not without several false starts along the way. Special contributions came from his initial contact with Inness shortly after that artist's sojourn in France; the startling revelations disclosed to Wyant by his study of John Constable and J. M. W. Turner and his stroke in 1873, which accelerated the artist's movement away from the sort of detailed examination of natural facts that one finds, for example, in his well-known, Mohawk Valley, in the collection of the Metropolitan Museum of Art. In his later years Wyant's solitary, introspective mood came to blend more closely than ever with his landscapes, especially those from the Arkville area at the Pakatakan Artists Colony, where a kindred spirit, John Francis Murphy, also worked.

He was a member of the Century Association and the National Academy of Design, to which he was elected in 1869. Exhibitions included the following venues: National Academy of Design, 1865–1892; Brooklyn Art Association, 1867–1892; Boston Art Club, 1877–1882; Pennsylvania Academy of Fine Arts, 1879–1881; Art Institute of Chicago; and Metropolitan Museum of Art. Public collections that own or display Wyant's work include the National Museum of American Art, Brooklyn Museum, Metropolitan Museum of Art, Toledo Museum of Art, Tennessee State Museum, Dayton Art Institute, Kentucky Art Museum, Snite Museum of Art and Yager Museum of Art & Culture.

He was also known as Alexander Wyant and A. H. Wyant.

== Other sources ==
- Smithsonian American Art Museum, Washington, DC.
