= Art methodology =

Techniques for art study or reassessment

Art methodology refers to a studied and constantly reassessed, questioned method within the arts, as opposed to a method merely applied (without thought). This process of studying the method and reassessing its effectiveness allows art to move on and change. It is not the thing itself but it is an essential part of the process.

An artist drawing, for instance, may choose to draw from what they observe in front of them, or from what they imagine, or from what they already know about the subject. These 3 methods will, very probably, produce 3 very different pictures. A careful methodology would include examination of the materials and tools used and how a different type of canvas/brush/paper/pencil/rag/camera/chisel etc. would produce a different effect. The artist may also look at various effects achieved by starting in one part of a canvas first, or by working over the whole surface equally. An author may experiment with stream of consciousness writing, as opposed to naturalistic narrative, or a combination of styles.

== Fine Art compared with Traditional Crafts ==
In stark contrast to fine art practice is the traditional craft form. With traditional crafts, the method is handed down from generation to generation with often very little change in techniques. It is usually fair to say that folk crafts employ a method but not an art methodology, since that would involve rigorous questioning and criticising of the tradition.

== Art Methodology compared with Science Methodology ==
An art methodology differs from a science methodology, perhaps mainly insofar as the artist is not always after the same goal as the scientist. In art it is not necessarily all about establishing the exact truth so much as making the most effective form (painting, drawing, poem, novel, performance, sculpture, video, etc.) through which ideas, feelings, perceptions can be communicated to a public. With this purpose in mind, some artists will exhibit preliminary sketches and notes which were part of the process leading to the creation of a work. Sometimes, in Conceptual art, the preliminary process is the only part of the work which is exhibited, with no visible result displayed. In such a case the "journey" is being presented as more important than the destination. Conceptual artist Robert Barry once put on an exhibition where the door of the gallery remained shut and a sign on the door informed visitors that the gallery would be closed for the exhibition. These kind of works question accepted concepts, such as that of having a tangible work of art as result.

== Some Art Methodology statements ==
=== Global Responsibility ===
The Peace Through Art methodology developed by the International Child Art Foundation (ICAF) was recognized as a Stockholm Challenge Finalist for 's statement on the methodology of the programme says: "the Peace Through Art methodology draws upon the creativity and imagination of young people, and teaches them the ethics of responsibility in this interdependent global village that has come to be our world. The methodology incorporates best practices from the fields of psychology, conflict resolution and peace education, while employing the power of the arts for self-expression, healing and communication."

Pauline Mottram SRAsTh, gave a short paper entitled "Towards developing a methodology to evaluate outcomes of Art Therapy in Adult Mental Illness." for the October 2000 TAoAT Conference. Here's an excerpt:

"In addressing the effectiveness challenge and in seeking a means of measuring outcomes of the art therapy service that I deliver, I have sought a methodology that can provide a valid and reliable quantitative outcome, whilst still respecting the aesthetic and humanistic nature of art therapy practice. This endeavour is made all the more complex by the fact that art therapy lacks a fully developed theory and it has a fragile research base. Generally it is argued that art therapy is more compatible with qualitative research designs that encompass subjectivity, rather than quantitative objective methods. Kaplan (1998, p95) states that 'Qualitative is exploratory and theory building. Quantitative tests hypothesis in order to refine and validate theory.' She holds that art therapy cannot afford to reject either form of inquiry."

=== Generative Art ===
In "The Methodology of Generative Art" by Tjark Ihmels and Julia Riedel, an online article at Media Art Net Mozart's "musical game of dice" is cited as a precedent for the methodology of Generative art which, say the authors, has "established itself in nearly every area of artistic practice (music, literature [3], the fine arts).":

"Mozart composed 176 bars of music, from which sixteen were chosen from a list using dice, which then produced a new piece when performed on a piano. Sixteen bars, each with eleven possibilities, can result in 1,116 unique pieces of music. Using this historical example, the methodology of generative art can be appropriately described as the rigorous application of predefined principles of action for the intentional exclusion of, or substitution for, individual aesthetical decisions that sets in motion the generation of new artistic content out of material provided for that purpose."
