= Tonalism =

Artistic movement

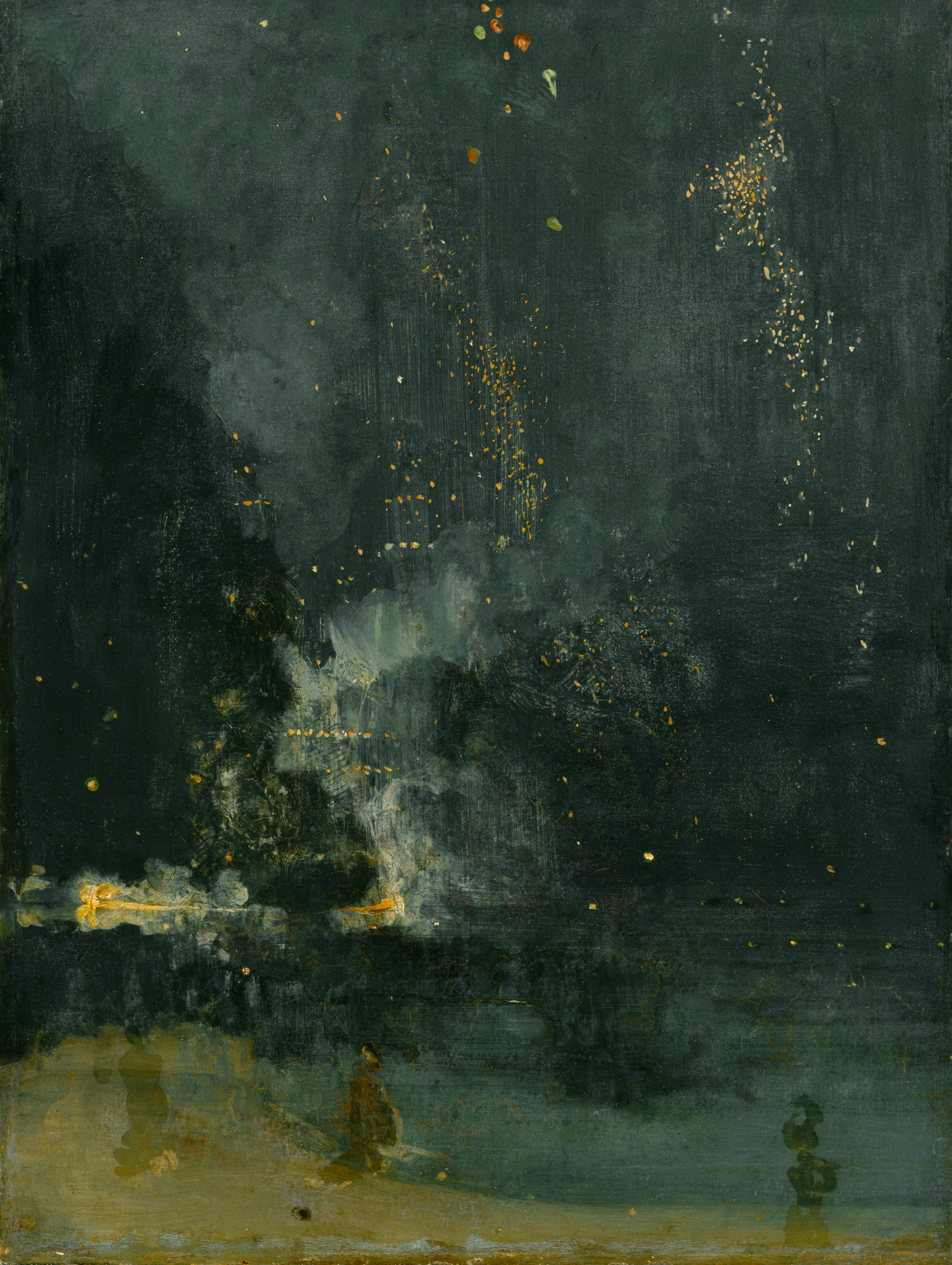
- James McNeill Whistler, Nocturne in Black and Gold: The Falling Rocket, c. 1875; oil on panel; 60.3 × 46.4 cm
- Years active: from the 1880s into the early 20th century
- Location: United States
- Major figures: Albert Pinkham Ryder, George Inness, John Henry Twachtman, James McNeill Whistler
- Influences: French Barbizon school, Hudson River School
- Influenced: Milton Avery, the Color Field painters, the circle of artists around Alfred Stieglitz, and etchers like Edith Loring Getchell

Tonalism was an artistic style that emerged in the 1880s. The movement was eventually eclipsed by Impressionism and European modernism.

== French origins ==
The French Barbizon school artists emphasized mood and shadow. The movement was eventually eclipsed by Impressionism and European modernism.

== America ==
American artists began to paint landscape forms with an overall tone of colored atmosphere or mist. Between 1880 and 1915, dark, neutral hues such as gray, brown or blue, often dominated compositions by artists associated with the style.

During the late 1890s, American art critics began to use the term "tonal" to describe these works, as well as the lesser-known synonyms Quietism and Intimism. Two of the leading associated painters were George Inness and James McNeill Whistler.

== Australia ==
Australian tonalism emerged as an art movement in Melbourne during the 1910s when it was promoted as a method of 'scientific' realist painting by Max Meldrum through his art school.

== Britain ==
St Ives artists were the leading exponents of this style in British landscape painting.

== Canada ==
In Canada the movement emerged in the 1890s through the influence of the American, Whistler.

== Artists ==
- Willis Seaver Adams
- George Ames Aldrich
- Joseph Allworthy
- Edward Mitchell Bannister
- Clarice Beckett
- Ralph Albert Blakelock
- Emanuele Cavalli
- Jean-Charles Cazin
- Colin Colahan
- Paul Cornoyer
- Bruce Crane
- Leon Dabo
- Elliott Daingerfield
- Angel De Cora
- Charles Melville Dewey
- Thomas Dewing
- Charles Warren Eaton
- Henry Farrer
- Edith Loring Getchell
- Percy Gray
- L. Birge Harrison
- Arthur Hoeber
- George Inness
- William Keith
- Percy Leason
- Xavier Martinez
- Arthur Frank Mathews
- Max Meldrum
- Robert Crannell Minor
- John Francis Murphy
- Frank Nuderscher
- Fausto Pirandello
- Henry Ward Ranger
- Granville Redmond
- Albert Pinkham Ryder
- William Sartain
- Edward Steichen
- Dwight William Tryon
- Jules Turcas
- John Twachtman
- Clark Greenwood Voorhees
- J. Alden Weir
- James McNeill Whistler
- Alexander Helwig Wyant
- Raymond Dabb Yelland

== Gallery ==
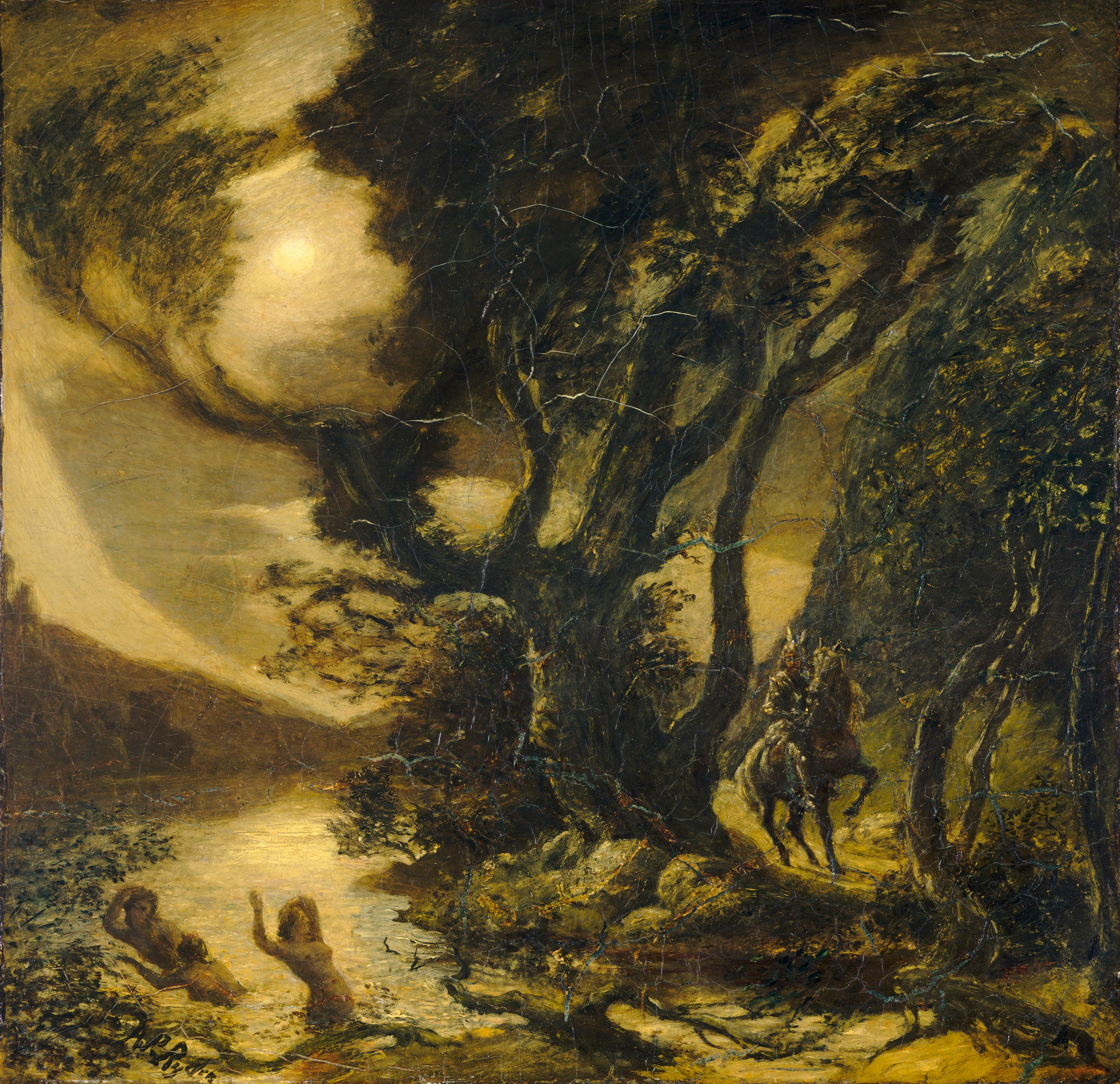
Albert Pinkham Ryder, Siegfried and the Rhine Maidens (1888 - 1891), National Gallery of Art, Washington, DC

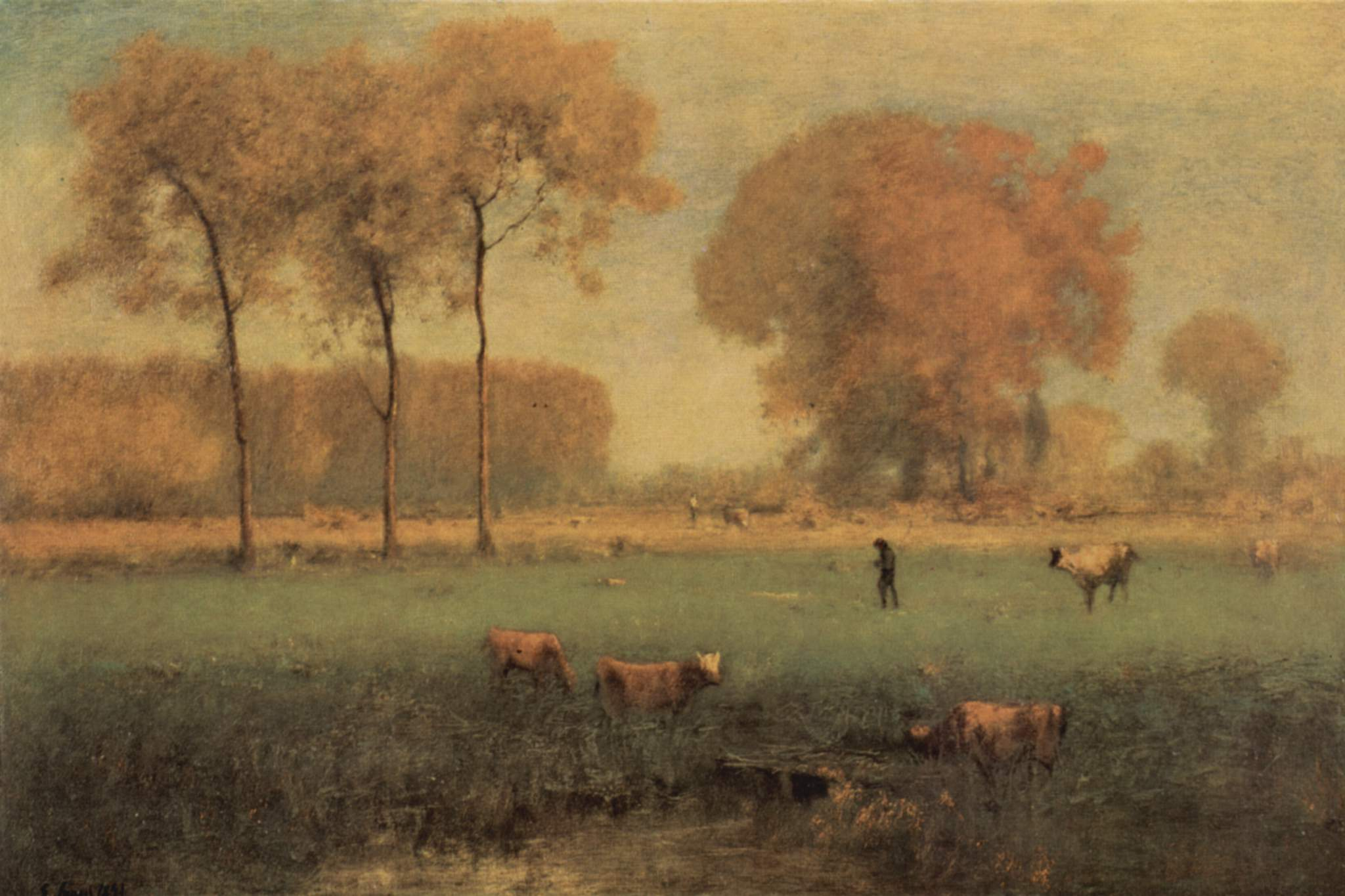
George Inness, Summer Landscape, 1894

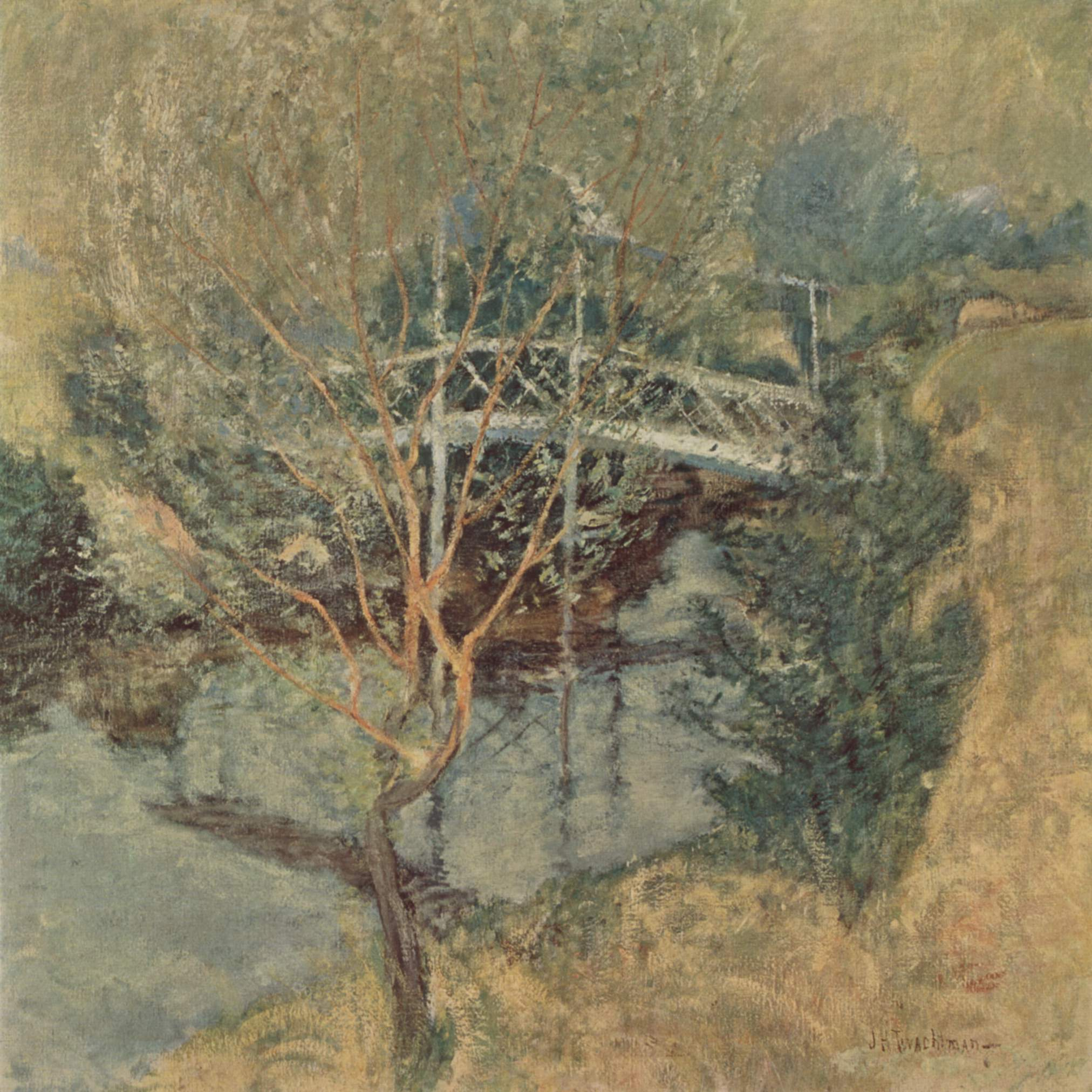
John H. Twachtman, The White Bridge, c. 1895, Minneapolis Institute of Arts

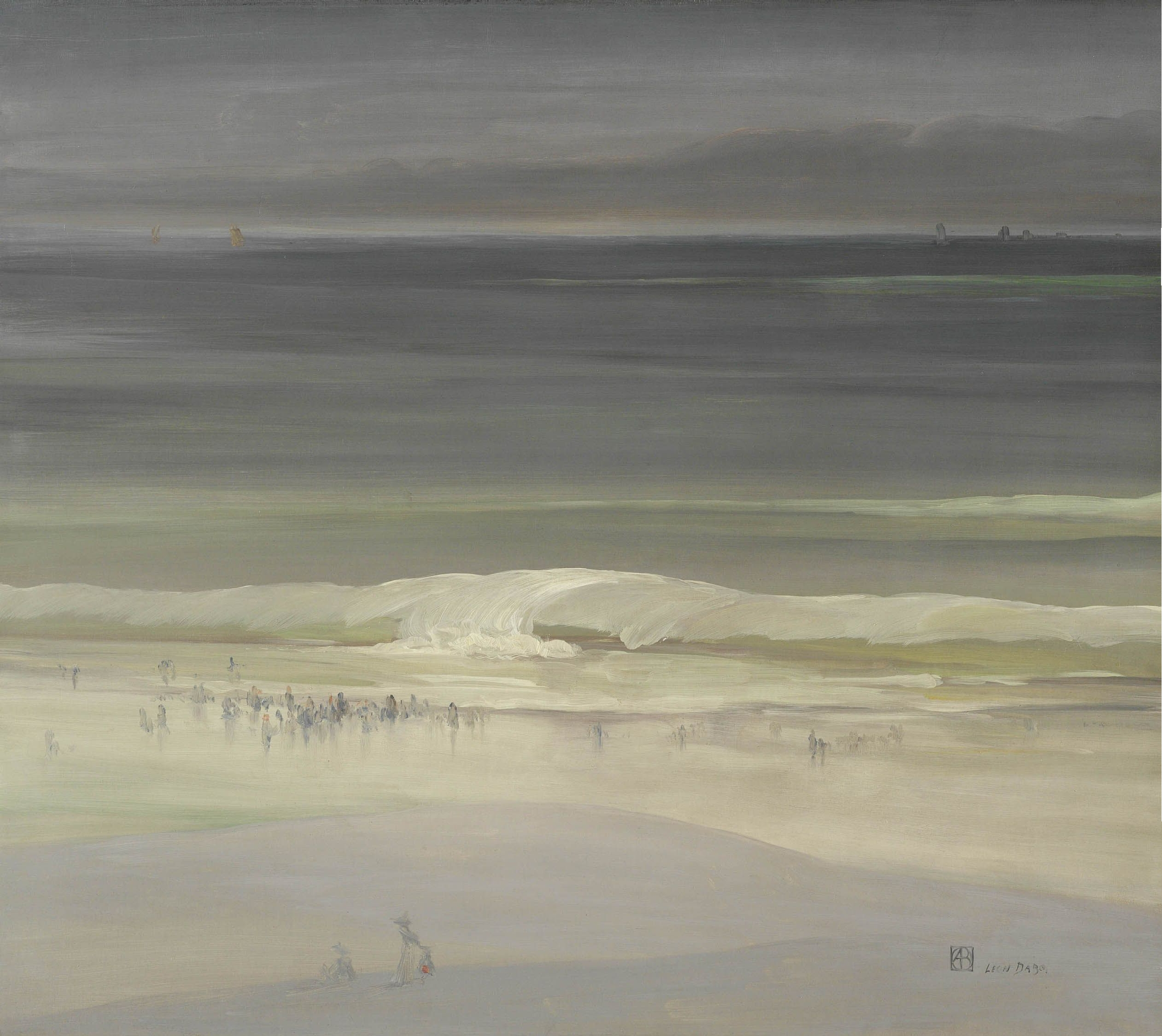
Leon Dabo, The Seashore, c. 1900; Oil on masonite; 76.8 x 86.4 cm

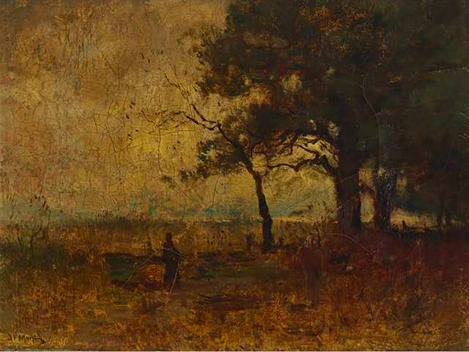
John Francis Murphy, Brooding New York landscape, c. 1900

== See also ==
- California Tonalism
- List of paintings by James McNeill Whistler
