= Hélène Sardeau =

American sculptor

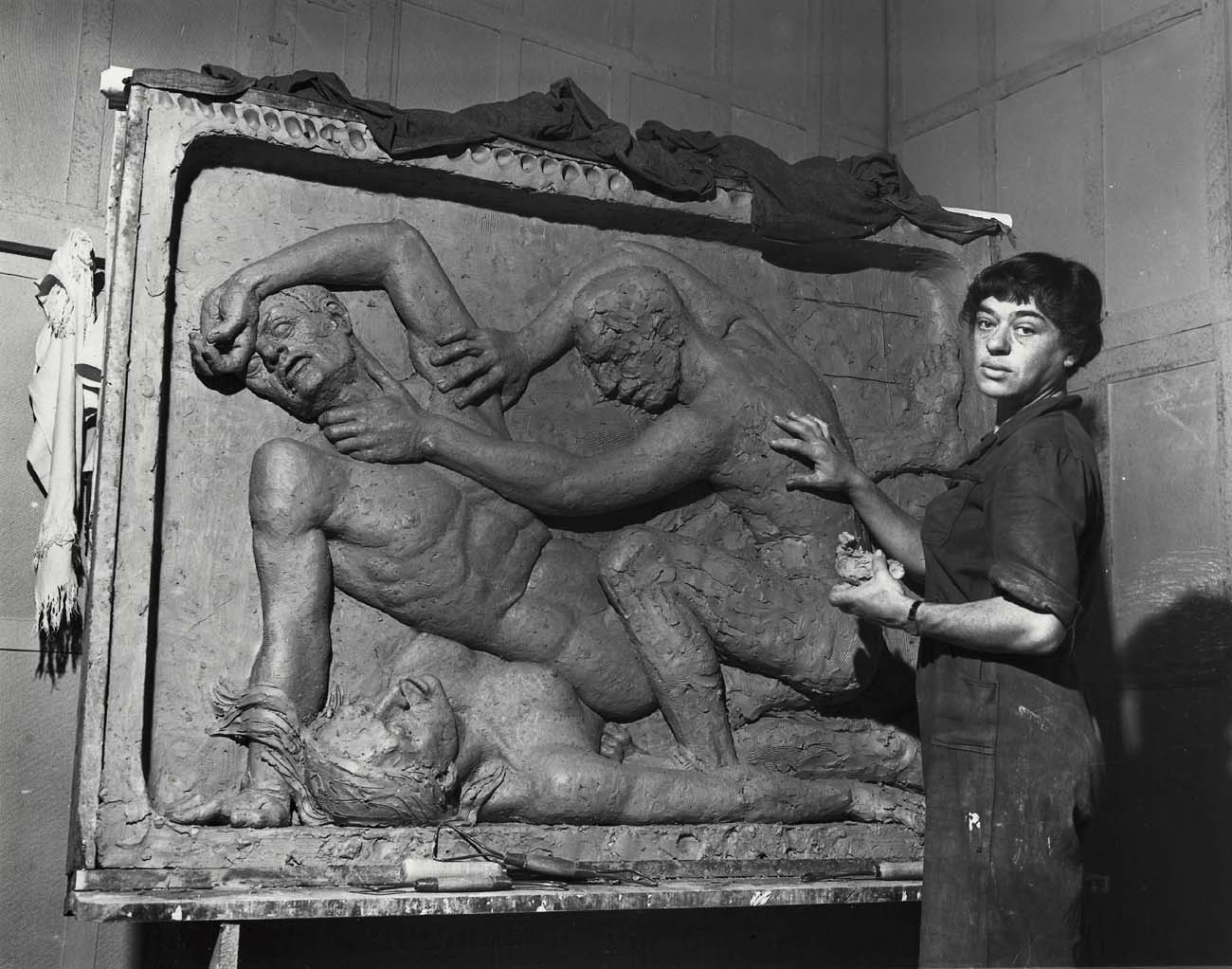
- Hélène Sardeau, mid to late 1930s
- Born: July 7, 1899; Antwerp, Belgium
- Died: March 23, 1969 (aged 79); Croton-on-Hudson, NY, U.S.
- Known for: Sculpture
- Movement: American modernism
- Spouse: George Biddle (m. 1931)

Hélène Sardeau (July 7, 1899 – March 23, 1969) was an American sculptor, born in Antwerp, Belgium, who moved with her family to the United States when she was about 14 years old.

== Early years ==
Sardeau arrived in the United States in 1913. She studied at Barnard College, the Art Students League of New York, Cooper Union, and at the School of American Sculpture, all in New York City. She studied with Mahonri Young. In the 1920s, she and he sister, Mathilde, created decorative portrait dolls depicting actors and actresses. She is credited with the masks for the 1927 film Prometheus in Chains.

== Career ==
She was a founding member of the Sculptors Guild. Her first major commission was The Slave (1940), completed as part of the Central Terrace of the Ellen Phillips Samuel Memorial in Philadelphia and exhibited at the Museum of Modern Art before its permanent installation. Her terra cotta sculpture, The Lovers (1937), was included in the Museum of Modern Art's Three Centuries of American Modernism (May 24–July 31, 1938), an exhibition that also traveled to the Musée du Jeu de Paume in Paris. In 1942, Brazil's Minister of Education commissioned Sardeau and her husband, George Biddle, for sculptural reliefs and mural paintings, respectively, at the National Library in Rio de Janeiro, for which Sardeau sculpted on the themes of violence and compassion. In the summer of 1949, she was one of 254 sculptors who exhibited in the 3rd Sculpture International held at the Philadelphia Museum of Art. In Life magazine's photograph of the International, she is pictured in the second row from the front, fourth from the left.

== Personal life ==
Sardeau was the wife of painter George Biddle. They had a son named Michael John.

Her papers can be found in the Smithsonian Institution's Archives of American Art.

== Work ==
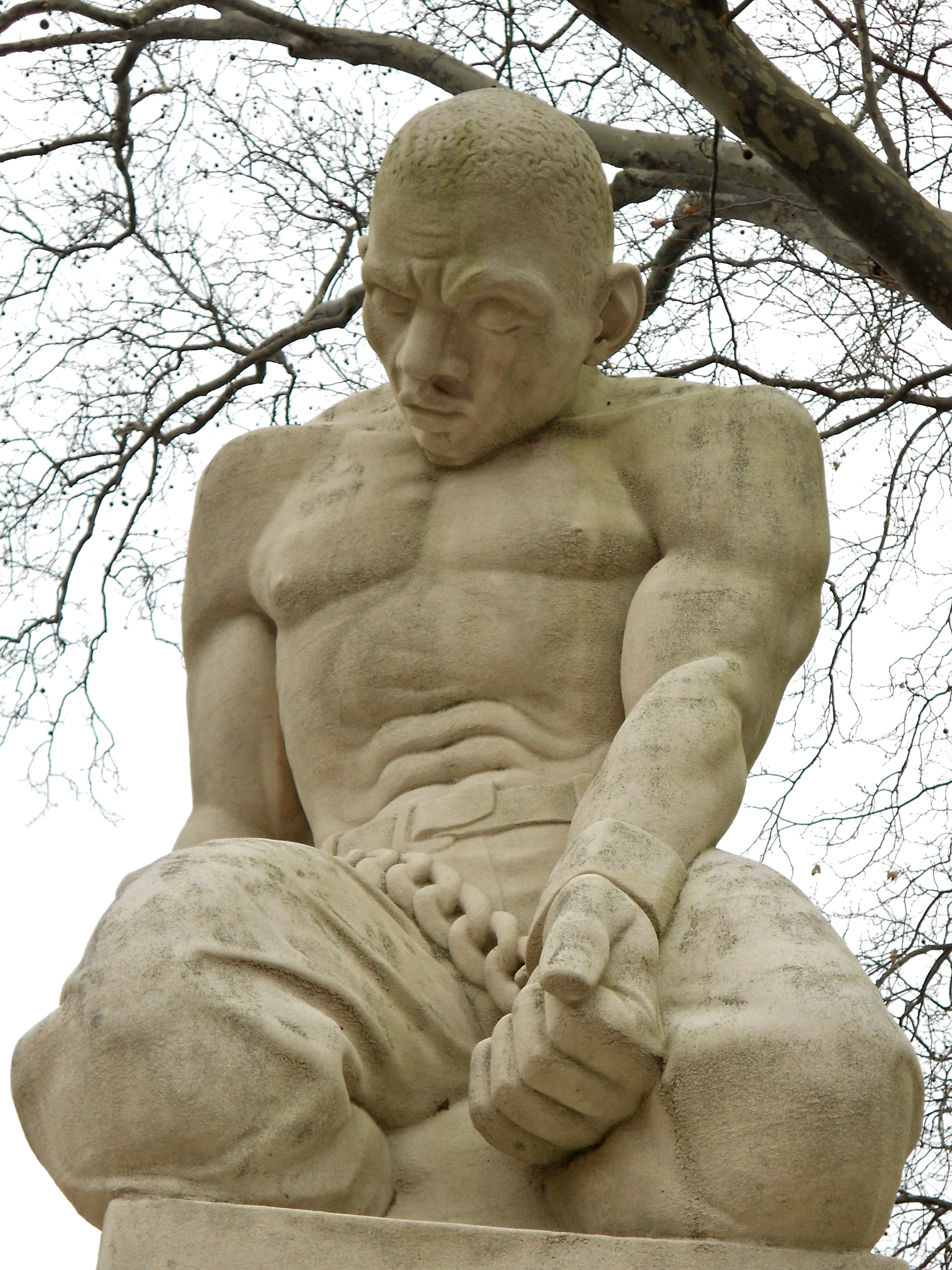
The Slave in Philadelphia's Fairmount Park

- In many private collections and:
- Amazon, Pennsylvania Academy of the Fine Arts, Philadelphia (1932)
- Mother and Child, Whitney Museum of American Art, New York City (1933)
- Sailors of the United States Mails (full-scale model, Ossining, NY Post Office), plaster with metal armature and hemp, Smithsonian American Art Museum, Washington, D.C. (1936)
- The Slave, limestone, Ellen Phillips Samuel Memorial, Fairmount Park, Philadelphia (1940)
- Negro Lament, Philadelphia Museum of Art (1941)
- Planting, Mother and Child, Reaping, post office reliefs, metal, Greenfield, MA (ca. 1941)
- Reliefs for the National Library of Brazil, soapstone, Rio de Janeiro, Brazil (1942)
- Icarus, plaster and bronze (1951)
- Kneeling Woman, bronze, Metropolitan Museum of Art, New York City (1955)
- Rape of the Sabine, Corcoran Gallery of Art, Washington, D.C.
- Untitled, relief print, woodcut, University of Maryland Art Gallery, College Park, MD (n.d.)
