= School of American Sculpture =

Former art school in New York City

Coordinates: 40°45′51″N 73°58′19″W

School of American Sculpture was an art school founded in New York City by Solon Borglum following the World War I, in about 1918, that lasted only shortly after Borglum's death in 1922.

During World War I, American sculptor Solon Borglum served at the front in a non-combatant position but was near enough to the action that he was gassed several times. While there he taught art at the AEF Art Training Center at Bellevue, Seine-et-Oise, near Paris at which hundreds of American soldiers received some art training, where he headed the sculpture department. There Borglum discovered that he liked teaching so when he returned to the United States he established the School of American Sculpture in New York. He created a book, Sound Construction, published in 1923, (Six Hundred Plates Drawn by the Author and Mildred Archer Nash.) as part of the curriculum. The illustrator, Nash, was a student of Borglum's.

Following Borglum's death in early 1922, an attempt to continue the school was made by appointing W. Frank Purdy, "long time president of the Art Alliance in New York and for thirty years in charge of the department of sculpture at Gorham's" to run the school. Purdy was to be assisted in this endeavor by a committee of governors including the sculptors Herbert Adams, Robert Ingersoll Aitken, George Grey Barnard, Daniel Chester French, Frances Grimes, Anna Hyatt, Frederick William MacMonnies, Hermon Atkins MacNeil, and Mahonri Young. The school did not stay open for much longer. It was located at 9 East 59th Street in Manhattan.

== Notable alumni ==
- Hélène Sardeau
