= Jane Belo =

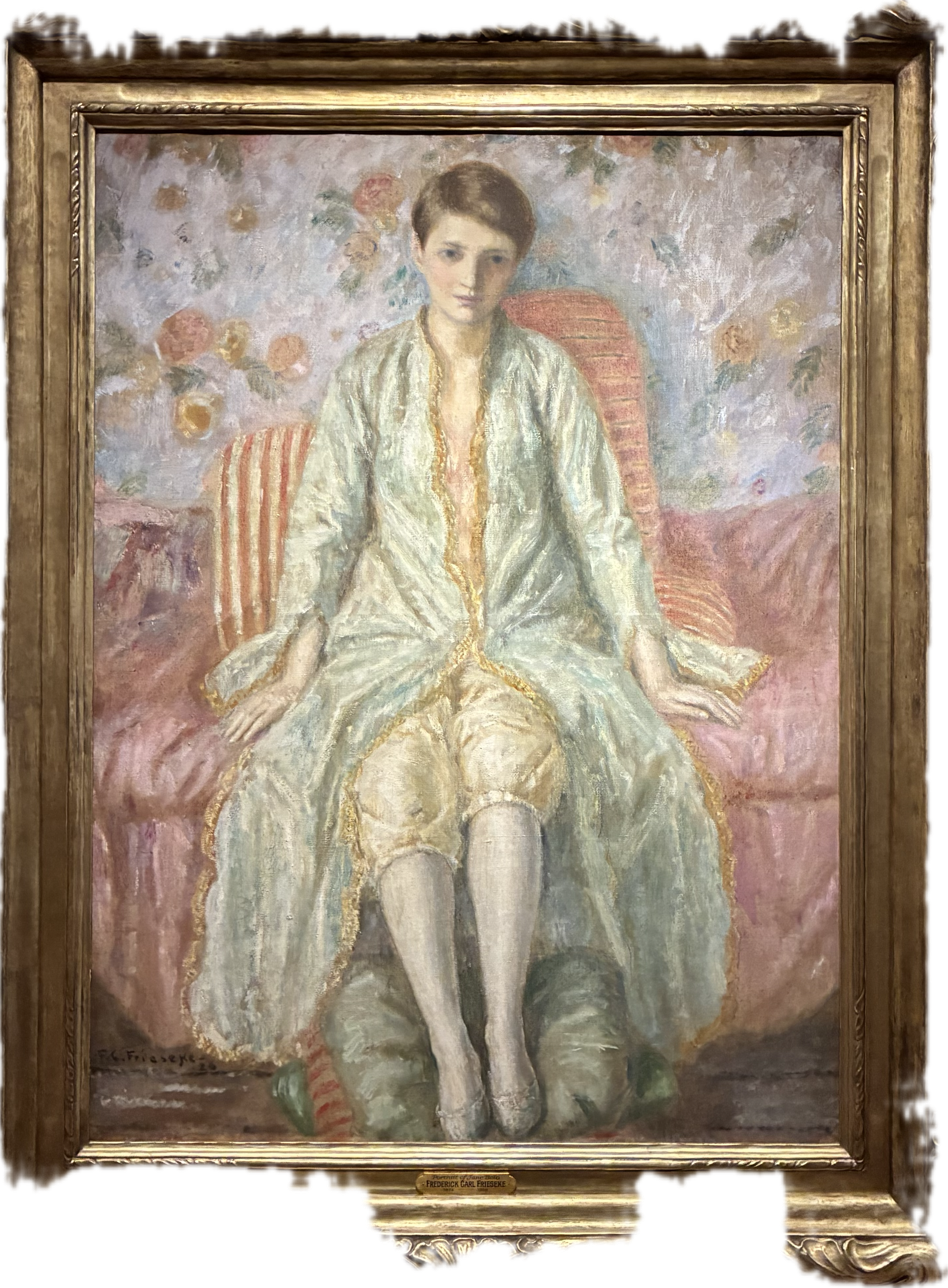
- Portrait of Jane Belo (1926) by Frederick Carl Frieseke (Virginia Museum of Fine Arts)
- Born: 3 November 1904; Dallas, Texas, United States
- Died: 3 April 1968 (aged 63); Putnam Valley, New York, United States
- Occupations: anthropologist, photographer, painter
- Spouses: George Biddle (m. 1925; div. 1929); Colin McPhee (m. 1930; div. 1938); Frank Tannenbaum (m. 1940)
- Parent(s): Alfred Horatio Belo Jr., and Helen Ponder Belo

Jane Belo Tannenbaum (3 November 1904 – 3 April 1968), known professionally as Jane Belo, was an American cultural anthropologist, photographer, and painter. She conducted extensive fieldwork in Bali during the 1930s, studying ceremonial life, religious behavior, trance, children's art, and Balinese social relations. Her anthropological work incorporated photography, film, interviews, and other methods of documenting cultural practices.

== Early life and education ==
Jane was born on 3 November 1904 in Dallas, Texas, to Alfred Horatio Belo Jr. and Helen Ponder Belo. Her father died when she was young, after which she traveled in Europe with her mother and sister Helen before the family settled in New York. She attended Brearley School, then Bryn Mawr College for a year upon graduation from Brearley. In 1922, she traveled with the Macy family in Africa and the Middle East, an experience that contributed to her developing interest in anthropology.

After returning to the United States, Belo studied for a year at Barnard College of Columbia University. It was here that she first met her friends and later colleagues Zora Neale Hurston and Margaret Mead. With them, Belo studied under anthropologists Franz Boas and Ruth Benedict. In 1924, Belo moved to Paris where she took courses at the Sorbonne and developed an interest in experimental psychopathology.

On her return from Paris, Belo taught at the Hessian Hills School in Croton-on-Hudson, New York. Her teaching contributed to an interest in children's art.

== Research in Bali ==
In 1930, Belo traveled to the Dutch East Indies. Originally intended as a six-month journey, the trip lasted nine years, during which Belo became involved in research on Balinese society, religion, and art.

Belo lived in a house in the village of Sayan in Bali. Her research concentrated on Balinese ceremonial life, trance, social mores, and children's art. She used both still photography and film as methods of anthropological observation and documentation. In 1934, Belo visited Margaret Mead and showed her some of the "trance" films she had recorded. It was this encounter that initiated Mead's project in Bali. In 1935, Belo began publishing her research on Balinese family relationships.

From 1936 to 1939, Mead and her husband, anthropologist Gregory Bateson, conducted fieldwork in Bali. Belo participated in the same research community, working with artists and researchers interested in Balinese and Javanese culture. In addition to Mead and Bateson, the community included painter and musician Walter Spies, dance and Indonesian art scholar Claire Holt, and Viennese ethnologist and photographer Hugo Bernatzik. The group experimented with systematic field research and new methods for documenting and analyzing culture. The research Belo did during this period formed the basis for the books she published in later decades.

== Later life and work ==
After her time in Bali, Belo returned to New York. In 1940, she financed Zora Neale Hurston's study of religious rituals and trances in the Commandment Keeper Church, an African American church in Beaufort, South Carolina. This resulted in Hurston's short documentary film Commandment Keeper Church, Beaufort South Carolina, May 1940. In 1946, Belo earned her bachelor's degree from Columbia University's School of General Studies. In 1949, Belo published Bali: Rangda and Barong, a detailed field study of Balinese ritual and folklore. Her approaches included photography, research with children, projective tests, and the analysis of art and artistic performance. Other books and articles followed, also based on the field notes, photographs, and recordings from her time in Bali.

From 1947 to 1950, she participated in Columbia University's "Research in Contemporary Cultures" program, which had been established by anthropologist Ruth Benedict and was later directed by Margaret Mead. She was also an active member of the Columbia University Seminars, which were established by her third husband Frank Tannenbaum.

== Research methods and interests ==
Belo's anthropological work emphasized methods of collecting and interpreting field data. Anthropologist Claude Lévi-Strauss complimented Belo's ethnographic documentation in Trance in Bali, particularly her detailed observational records of possession dances. In her review of the same book, anthropologist Claire Holt praised Belo's use of complementary forms of observation, including field notes, photographs, and verbatim transcripts of songs and incantations. Margaret Mead called Belo "one of the most gifted observers and interviewers whom it has been my good fortune to know." Although Bali was the principal geographic focus of her research, her interests encompassed visual culture, psychology, and artistic expression.

== Personal life ==
Belo married three times. Belo's first marriage to artist George Biddle on 27 January 1925 in Paris ended in divorce in 1929. Belo's second marriage was to Canadian musicologist and composer Colin McPhee on 6 May 1930; it ended in divorce in 1938. Her third marriage was to professor and author Frank Tannenbaum on 22 May 1940.

== Death and legacy ==
Belo's health declined during her later years but she continued writing and painting. She died on 3 April 1968 at the age of 63 of throat cancer. In her will, she bequeathed 75 percent of her estate to the continued support of the University Seminars at Columbia University.

== Selected publications ==
- Belo, Jane (1949). Bali: Rangda and Barong. Locust Valley, New York: J.J. Augustin. ISBN 9780295740775.
- Belo, Jane (1953). Bali: Temple Festival (Vol XXII of Monographs of the American Ethnological Society). Seattle and London: University of Washington Press.
- Belo, Jane (1960). Trance in Bali. New York: Columbia University Press. ISBN 0231023723.
- Belo, Jane (1970). Traditional Balinese culture: Essays. New York: Columbia University Press. ISBN 9780231030847.
