= Margaretta S. Hinchman =

American painter

Margaretta Shoemaker Hinchman (1876–1955) was a prize-winning American artist, illustrator, photographer, and sculptor who came from a prominent Pennsylvania Quaker family. She bequeathed her collection of Southwest American art, including her own gouache-on-paper portraits of Navajo individuals, to the University of Pennsylvania Museum of Archaeology and Anthropology. The Pennsylvania Academy of the Fine Arts, the Woodmere Art Museum, and the Delaware Art Museum preserve some of her landscape paintings and illustrations. The Philadelphia Museum of Art preserves her bequest of works by other artists, including George Biddle, Angelo Pinto, Clare Leighton, and Charles Sheeler. Haverford College in Haverford, Pennsylvania preserves her letterbooks in the Quaker and Special Collections division of its library. Among the prizes that Hinchman won was the Mary Smith Prize, which she received twice, including in 1943 for her portrait of the singer Marian Anderson.

== Education and career ==
Margaretta Schoemaker Hinchman was born in Philadelphia, Pennsylvania on July 12, 1876. Her mother was Lydia Swain Mitchell; her father was Charles Shoemaker Hinchman. Hinchman studied art in the late 1890s. Her teachers included the sculptor Charles Grafly, the illustrator Howard Pyle, the watercolorists Onorato Carlandi and Earl Horter, and later, in New York, the painter Kenyon Cox. It was by studying with Cox that she developed her skills as a muralist and figure painter.

Hinchman illustrated many books. These include Early Settlers of Nantucket: Their Associates and Descendants, which her mother, Lydia S. Hinchman wrote in 1901; My Busy Days: A Child’s Verse, by Edith B. Sturgis (1908); and The Beauties of Fairmount Park throughout the Year (1936). The Delaware Art Museum preserves two gouache-on-paper illustrations that she produced for an edition of Grimm’s Fairy Tales.

During World War I, Hinchman volunteered as an ambulance driver. She also painted posters for the U.S. Shipping Board, and produced target paintings for Camp Dix.

=== Historic and city landscapes ===
For the Sesqui-Centennial International Exposition that occurred in Philadelphia in 1926, Margaretta Hinchman painted four panels of Colonial port views, depicting the cities of Philadelphia, Boston, New York and Charleston; in 2014 the panels sold at auction for $20,000. The Sesqui-Centennial International Exposition was organized by the Women's Committee of 1926 to teach people about eighteenth-century American life. Hinchman painted people dressed in historically accurate attire on top of period prints. Following the exhibition, the panels were displayed in a one-woman show before they made their way to the Woodmere Art Museum. Wallpaper based on the panels was created by Birge & Co. of Buffalo, New York for the historic Sweetbriar Mansion of Philadelphia.

=== Penn Museum Bequest ===
Margaretta Hinchman donated 28 items to the University of Pennsylvania Museum of Archaeology and Anthropology (the Penn Museum) upon her death in 1955, a bequest that included both her own as well as others’ art. Her bequest included art and objects by Clyde Colville, Lorenzo Pino, Tse-Ye-Mu, Ma-Pe-Wi (also known as Velino Shije Herrera), Bist Rani and other unknown artists and makers. Together, the bequest includes works from Navajo, Tesuque, Pueblo and Zuni cultures as well as pottery from Mexico. Hinchman’s personal work in the Penn Museum is focused on gouache portraits of individuals identified as Navajo, including works such as "Portrait of a Navaho Woman: Hosteen Yashi Bitsoe (Daughter of Little Man)".
