= George Biddle =

American painter (1885–1973)

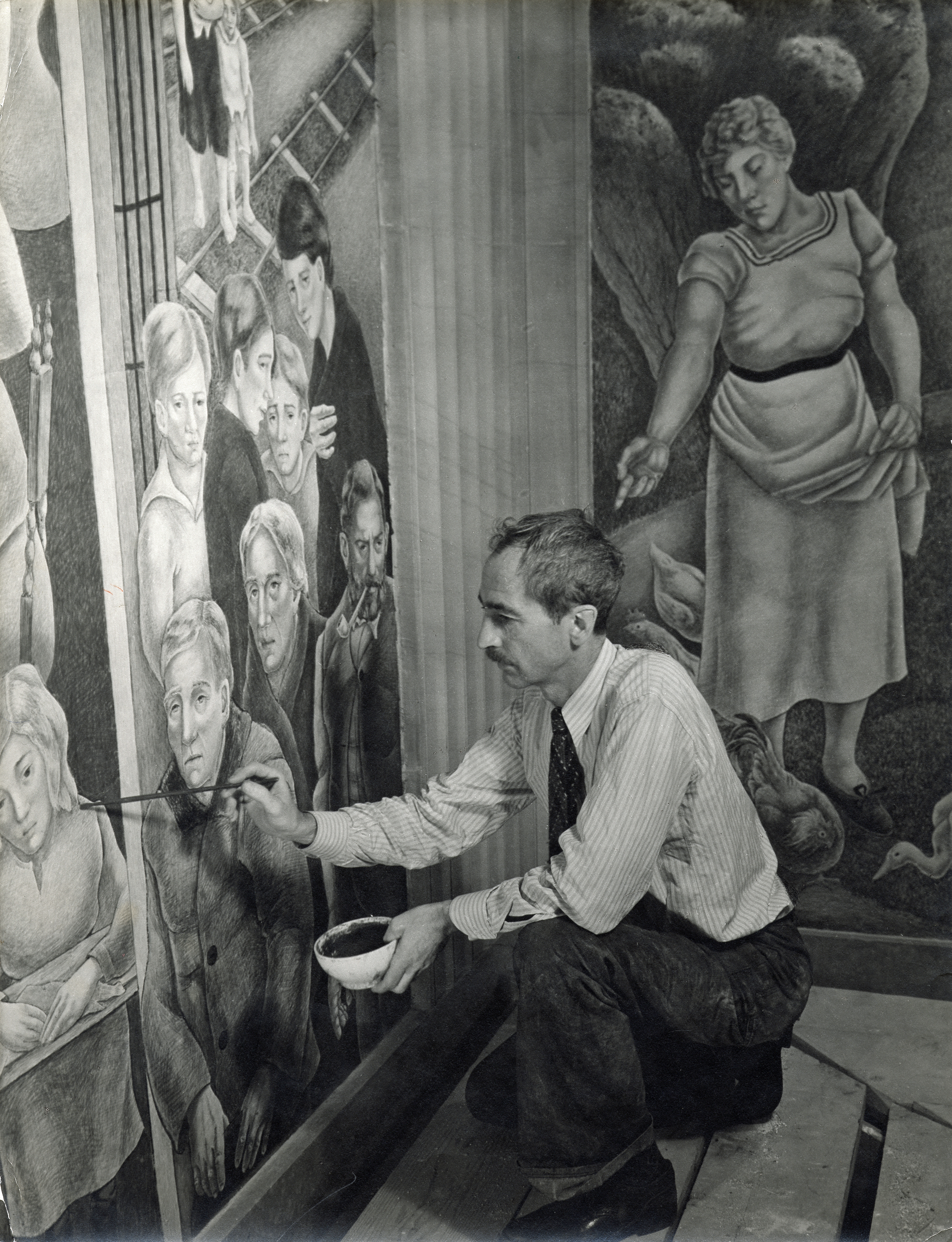
- George Biddle in 1936, at work on his mural Society Freed Through Justice, in the Robert F. Kennedy Department of Justice Building in Washington, D.C.
- Born: January 24, 1885
- Died: November 6, 1973 (aged 88)
- Known for: Federal Art Project
- Movement: social realism

George Biddle (January 24, 1885 – November 6, 1973) was an American painter, muralist and lithographer, best known for his social realism and combat art. A childhood friend of President Franklin D. Roosevelt, he played a major role in establishing the Federal Art Project (1935–1943), which employed artists under the Works Progress Administration.

== Biography ==
=== Education ===
Born to an established Philadelphia family, Biddle attended the elite Groton School (where he was a classmate of Franklin D. Roosevelt). He completed his undergraduate studies and later earned a law degree from Harvard (1908 and 1911, respectively). He passed his bar examination in Philadelphia.

Biddle's legal career was short-lived, however, and by the end of 1911 he had left the United States to study at the Académie Julian in Paris. In the next two years he studied at the Pennsylvania Academy of the Fine Arts. Returning to Europe in 1914, Biddle spent time in Munich and Madrid, studying printmaking in the Spanish capital, before trying his hand at impressionism in France. As he remembered, "I gobbled up museums, French Impressionism, cubism, futurism, and the old masters; I copied Velasquez in Madrid and Rubens in Munich…." In 1917, with the United States' entry into the First World War, Biddle enlisted in the army.

In the early interwar period Biddle continued his studies in far-flung locations such as Tahiti, returned to France in 1924, and in 1928 went on a sketching trip through Mexico with Diego Rivera.

=== Career ===
Prior to his Mexican travels, Biddle had returned to the United States in 1927 and established a printing shop in New York, where he "began to explore the variety and richness of technique and expressionism possible in lithography", a medium which he hoped would "popularize American art by making it better known to the American public". He was a member of the Society of American Graphic Artists.

In the 1930s, Biddle became a champion of social art and strongly advocated government funding for artistic endeavors. His correspondence with his former classmate (and recently elected president) Franklin Roosevelt contributed to the establishment of the Federal Art Project, an arm of the Works Progress Administration that produced several hundred thousand pieces of publicly funded art. Biddle himself completed a mural titled The Tenement for the Justice Department building in Washington, D.C., and made sketches of the opera Porgy and Bess during its late 1930s tour. His works were exhibited at the 1939 New York World's Fair. During these years Biddle also wrote several books and taught at the Colorado Springs Fine Arts Center. Biddle was hired in 1940, along with eight other prominent American artists, to document dramatic scenes and characters during the production of the film The Long Voyage Home, a cinematic adaptation of Eugene O'Neill's plays.

He served as president of the National Society of Mural Painters from 1935 to 1936.

During World War II, Biddle was appointed chairman of the United States Department of War's Art Advisory Committee and served to recruit artists to that body. Biddle himself traveled through Algeria, Tunisia, Sicily, and Italy with the 3rd Infantry Division and produced works documenting that unit's activities. He wrote a book on his war travels: Artist at War Tunisia-Sicily-Italy, Viking Press, 1944. When the Art Advisory Committee was disbanded, he produced combat art for Life magazine.

Towards the end of World War II, between 1943 and 1944, Biddle and his wife, Hélène Sardeau, were commissioned to design and paint a mural for the Supreme Court of Mexico. The mural, War and Peace, was completed in 1945. The Japanese-American artist Ruth Asawa, who was studying in Mexico in 1945, learned how to apply wet plaster for this particular mural.

In 1950, Biddle was appointed to the U.S. Commission of Fine Arts, serving until 1951 and again from 1953 to 1955.

==== Society Freed Through Justice ====
Biddle's best known work is in the mural Society Freed Through Justice, five fresco panels in fifth-floor stairway of the Robert F. Kennedy Department of Justice Building in Washington, D.C., produced under the U.S. Treasury Department's Section of Painting and Sculpture. At the time of Biddle's death in 1973, New York Times art critic John Canaday called the mural "the best he ever did. It depicted the everyday people of this country with extraordinary dignity, and it still stands up today."

=== Personal life ===
George Biddle's brother was Francis Biddle (1886–1968), who was Attorney General of the United States. During Francis' tenure as the Attorney General, the new Department of Justice Building opened featuring murals painted by George that incorporated Francis' image in the "Life of the Law" mural. George Biddle was married three times:

- Anne ("Nancy") Coleman (b. 1896), married from 1917 to 1921
- Jane Belo (November 3, 1904 – April 3, 1968) an anthropologist from Dallas, Texas, to whom he was married from 1925 to 1929
- Hélène Sardeau (July 7, 1899 Antwerp (Belgium) – 1969) a sculptor, to whom he was married from 1930 until her death.
  - Michael John Biddle (b. November 15, 1934).

George Biddle died on November 6, 1973, in Croton-on-Hudson, New York.

== Style and influences ==
Some factors that contributed to Biddle's artwork are the many art movements that he was involved in. Biddle was involved in "French Impressionism; the American Ashcan School; the School of Paris and Cubism during those early and exciting days when it first exploded on the world; Regionalism, the Mexican Mural Movement, and the New Deal Subsidy of Art". He also was involved in the "post war currents of contemporary art". Many of his works of art were contemporary. Another factor that contributed to Biddle's artwork were his friendships with many great "painters, sculptors, and critics of the past generation and his life-long activity in behalf of fellow artists". He borrowed many of the other artists' styles and turned them into his own by using different techniques and images to get a different effect. Biddle believed that everyone's life should be influenced by every "fact with which one comes in contact, until one ceases to grow or is, actually dead". This is the reason why Biddle became such a successful American artist; he had his own style, and expressed real actual events.

A further influence on Biddle was Mary Cassatt. Biddle met Cassatt at the Académie Julian in Paris; she too was from Philadelphia. Cassatt helped to cultivate in Biddle an appreciation of the work of Degas. Some of Biddle's prints reflected "the style of these two artists in their intimate, domestic subject matter".

Biddle put in his "personal feelings—affection, humor, compassion, irony, social outrage—as well as his technical mastery of the lithographic medium" to "enliven his work".

George Biddle achieved a lot of goals that helped other artists make their way. His work serves as a "kind of index to the many style and themes which occupied artists in the first half of the 20th century". When Biddle volunteered to go to the war, it changed his whole life and how he saw the world. He got to travel the country and study the art of different cultures thus enriching the art that he would produce. Biddle captured scenes and people how they naturally occurred in life. "Catfish Row" is a good example of Biddle capturing people and objects in their natural state. "Rejecting the stale formulas of academism and critical of what he saw as a loss of articulate emotional expressionism in much of modernist art, Biddle grappled with his own artistic identity throughout his life".

The artist Margaretta S. Hinchman bequeathed a self-portrait by George Biddle to the Philadelphia Museum of Art upon her death in 1955.

== Selected works ==
- Illustrations for Porgy and Bess libretto (1930). Commissioned by George and Ira Gershwin.
- Portrait of Helene Sardeau, the Artist's Wife (1931), Corcoran Gallery of Art, Washington, D.C.
- Self-Portrait (1933), Philadelphia Museum of Art.
- Murals for Robert F. Kennedy Department of Justice Building (1936), Washington, D.C.
- La Guerra y la Paz (War and Peace) for Supreme Court of Justice of the Nation (1940), Mexico City, Mexico.
- Portrait of Man Ray (1941), Philadelphia Museum of Art.
- Portrait of Frieda Lawrence (1941), Philadelphia Museum of Art.
- Murals for National Library of Brazil (1942), Rio de Janeiro, Brazil.

== Books by Biddle ==
- Green Island. Coward-McCann, New York 1930.
- Adolphe Borie. American Federation of Arts, Washington, D.C. 1937.
- An American Artist's Story. Littlem, Brown & Co., Boston 1939. (memoir)
- Artist at War. The Viking Press, New York 1944.
- George Biddle's War Drawings. The Hyperion Press, distributed by Duell, Sloan and Pearce, 1944
- The Yes and No of Contemporary Art. An Artist's Evolution. Harvard University Press, Cambridge, Mass. 1957.
- Indian Impressions. The Orion Press, New York 1960.
- Tahitian Journal. University of Minnesota Press, Minneapolis 1968.

== See also ==
- Biddle family
- United States Commission of Fine Arts
