= Colin McPhee =

Canadian composer and ethnomusicologist (1900-1964)

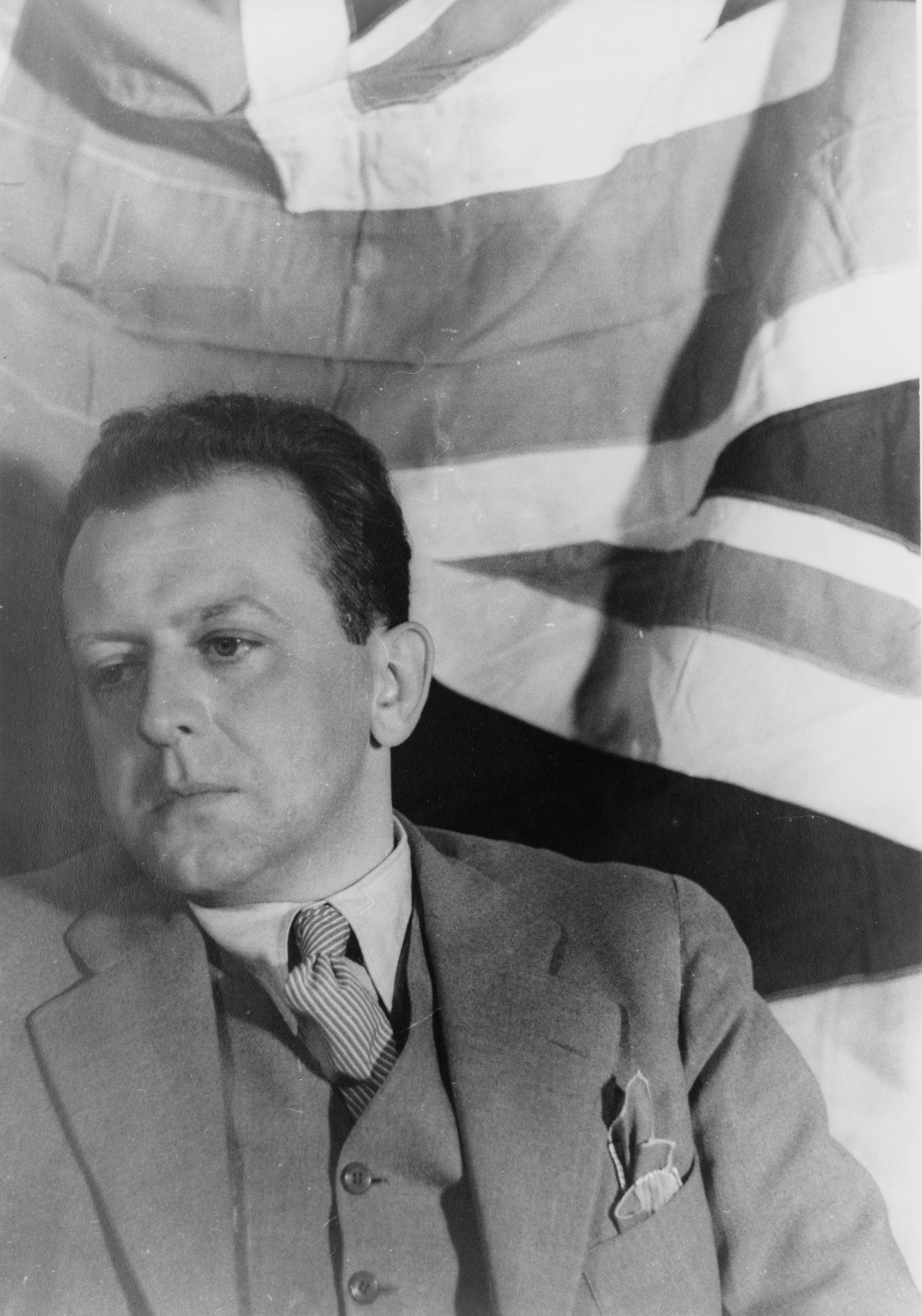
- Portrait of McPhee by American photographer Carl Van Vechten, c. 1935
- Born: March 15, 1900; Montréal, Québec, Canada
- Died: January 7, 1964 (aged 63); Los Angeles, California
- Occupations: Composer; ethnomusicologist; teacher
- Spouse: Jane Belo (m. 1931; div. 1939)

Colin Carhart McPhee (March 15, 1900 – January 7, 1964) was a Canadian-American composer and ethnomusicologist. He is best known for being the first Western composer to make a musicological study of Bali, and to develop American gamelan along with fellow composer Lou Harrison. He wrote original music influenced by that of Bali and Java, decades before compositions based on world music became widespread.

== Early life and career ==
=== Childhood ===
McPhee was born on March 15, 1900, in Montréal, Québec, Canada, to a family of mostly Scottish and German ancestry. His father, Alexander McPhee, was an advertising executive for Bell Telephone Company. His mother, Lavinia McPhee (née Carhart) was originally from New Jersey and settled in Montréal after marrying Alexander.

=== First musical education ===
In 1918 he enrolled in the Peabody Institute at the Johns Hopkins University, studying composition with Gustav Strube and piano with Harold Randolph; subsequently he studied with the avant-garde composer Edgard Varèse before marrying Jane Belo, a disciple of Margaret Mead, in 1931.

== Career ==
McPhee joined the circle of experimental composers known as the "ultra-modernists" and was among those—along with the group's leader, Henry Cowell, John J. Becker, and Cowell protégé Lou Harrison—particularly interested in what would later become known as "world music". McPhee and his wife moved to Bali together for Belo's anthropological work. Once there McPhee studied, filmed and wrote extensively about the culture and music of the gamelans, and in 1936 wrote an original musical score, Tabuh Tabuhan, in the Balinese style.

McPhee, who was gay, divorced Belo in 1939. In the early 1940s he lived in a large brownstone in Brooklyn, which he shared with W. H. Auden and Benjamin Britten, among others.

In 1942, he arranged Britten's Variations on a Theme of Frank Bridge, a work for string orchestra, for two pianos, to be used for Lew Christensen's ballet Jinx. McPhee was responsible for introducing Britten to the Balinese music that influenced such works by the British composer as The Prince of the Pagodas, Curlew River, and Death in Venice.

In 1947, McPhee published a book A House in Bali, about Balinese culture and music during the 1930s. Later in the decade, McPhee fell into an alcohol-fueled depression, but began to write music again during the 1950s. He became professor of ethnomusicology at UCLA in 1958 and was also a respected jazz critic. He died in Los Angeles.

In the 1990s, Alex Pauk's Esprit Orchestra recorded and released renditions of several never previously recorded compositions by McPhee. This resulted in McPhee receiving posthumous Juno Award nominations for Best Classical Composition for "Symphony No. 2" at the Juno Awards of 1998 and "Concerto for Wind Orchestra" at the Juno Awards of 1999. He won the award in 1999.

American composer Evan Ziporyn wrote an opera about McPhee's life, titled A House in Bali. The opera premiered at Puri Saraswati in Ubud, Bali, on June 26 and 27, 2009.

In 2017, an album Peter Pears: Balinese Ceremonial Music, performed Thomas Bartlett & Nico Muhly and partly based on McPhee's transcriptions, was released on the Nonesuch/Warners label.

== Published works ==
McPhee's A House in Bali, the chronicle of his life there, is still considered a valuable introduction to Balinese culture. His posthumously published Music in Bali was the first comprehensive analysis of Balinese music published in English.

His best-known musical work is Tabuh-Tabuhan: Toccata for Orchestra, composed and premiered in Mexico in 1936. Its title translates as "collection of percussion instruments", and it combines Balinese and traditional Western musical elements. It is scored for Western orchestra but, in McPhee's description, the core of the ensemble is a "'nuclear gamelan' composed of two pianos, celesta, xylophone, marimba, and glockenspiel," giving it a percussive balance of sound. The orchestra is augmented by two Balinese gongs and cymbals. The work is in three movements: "Ostinatos," a flute-related "Nocturne," and a syncopated "Finale." Some of the themes in it derive from Balinese folk sources. In 2013, the piece was choreographed and performed by the American Ballet Theater Company.

- Angkloeng gamelans in Bali. (1937?)
- Balinese wajang koelit and its music. (1936?, 1981) ISBN 0-404-16765-9
- Children and music in Bali. (1938) Publisher: Overdruk Uit Djawa
- A House in Bali. (1944) Publisher: The Asia Press with The John Day Company, New York
- Transitions for orchestra. (1954)
- Music in Bali: a study in form and instrumental organization in Balinese orchestral music. (1966, 1976) ISBN 0-306-70778-0
- A House in Bali. (1980) ISBN 0-404-16766-7 (introduction by James Murdoch)
- Club of small men : a children's tale from Bali. (2002) ISBN 0-7946-0074-3

== Films ==
- 1985: Colin McPhee: The Lure of Asian Music (dir. Michael Blackwood)

== Recordings ==
- "ORIGINS2: forgotten percussion works, vol. 2", Percussion Art Ensemble, directed by Ron Coulter, (Kreating SounD KSD 18, December 2020)
