= Kenyon Cox =

American artist and writer (1856–1919)

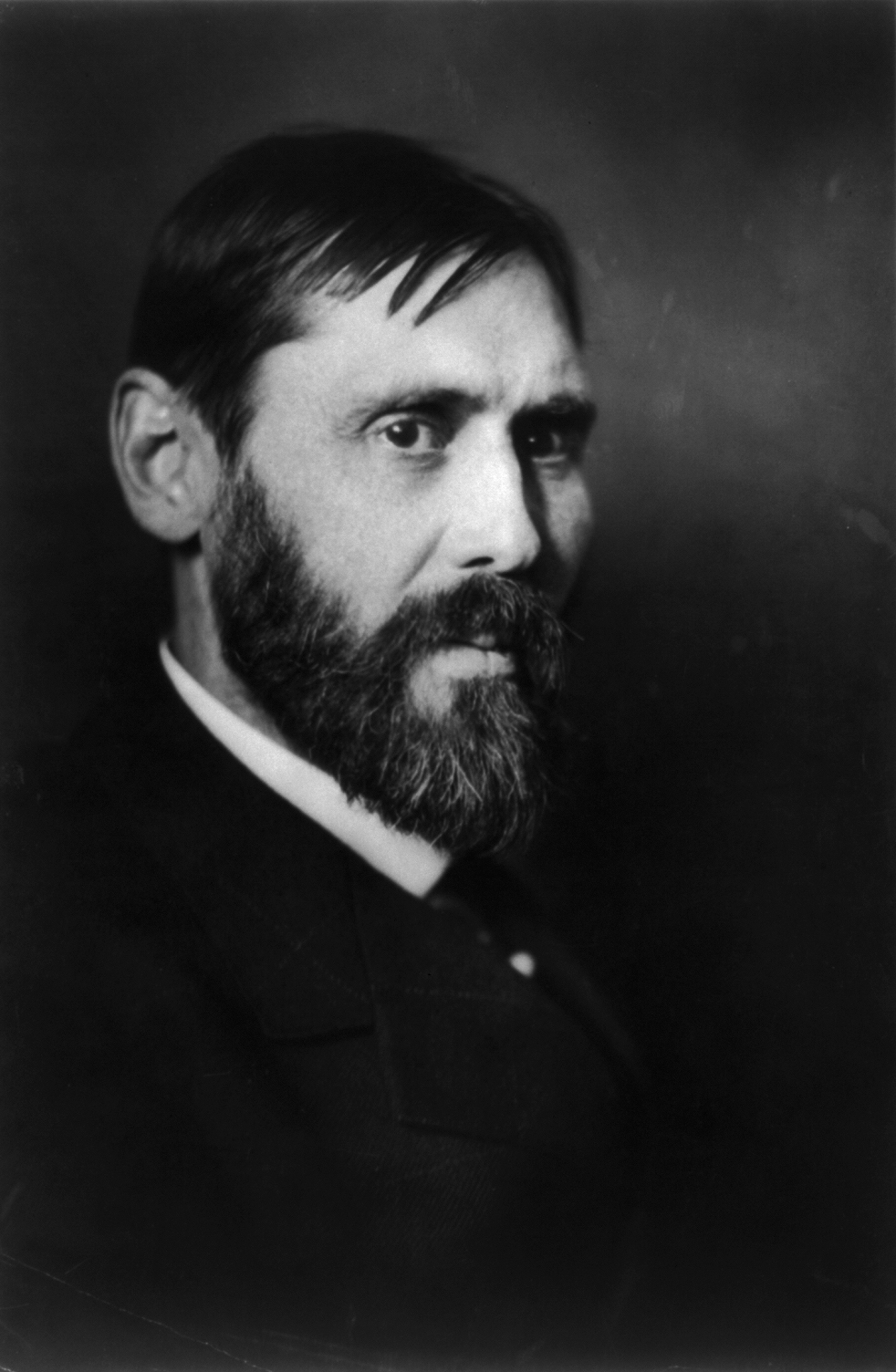
- Cox in 1896
- Born: October 27, 1856
- Died: March 17, 1919 (aged 62)
- Known for: Painter, Illustrator, Muralist, writer,
- Spouse: Louise Howland King (1892–1919, his death)
- Awards: Second Hallgarten Prize (1889)

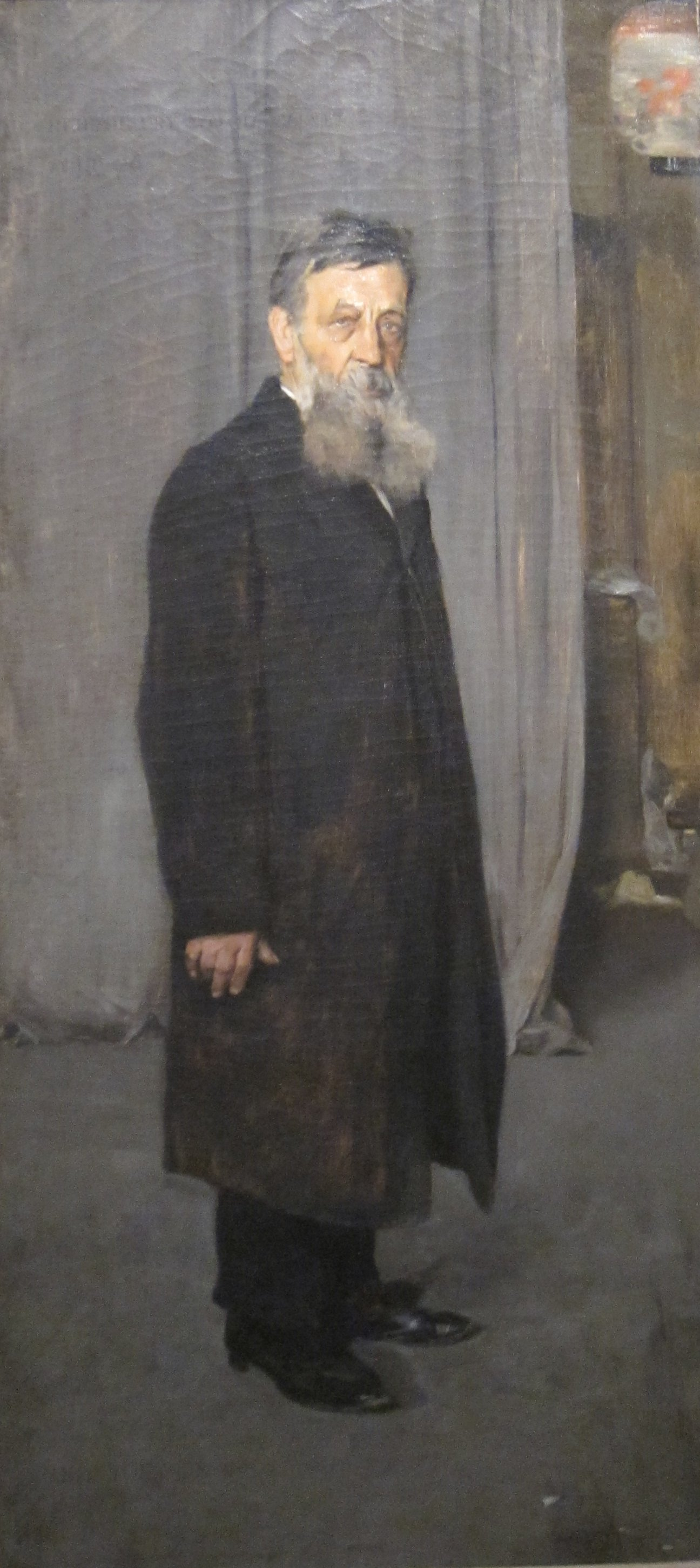
Kenyon Cox, Portrait of Henry L. Fry, 1883, oil on canvas, Cincinnati Art Museum

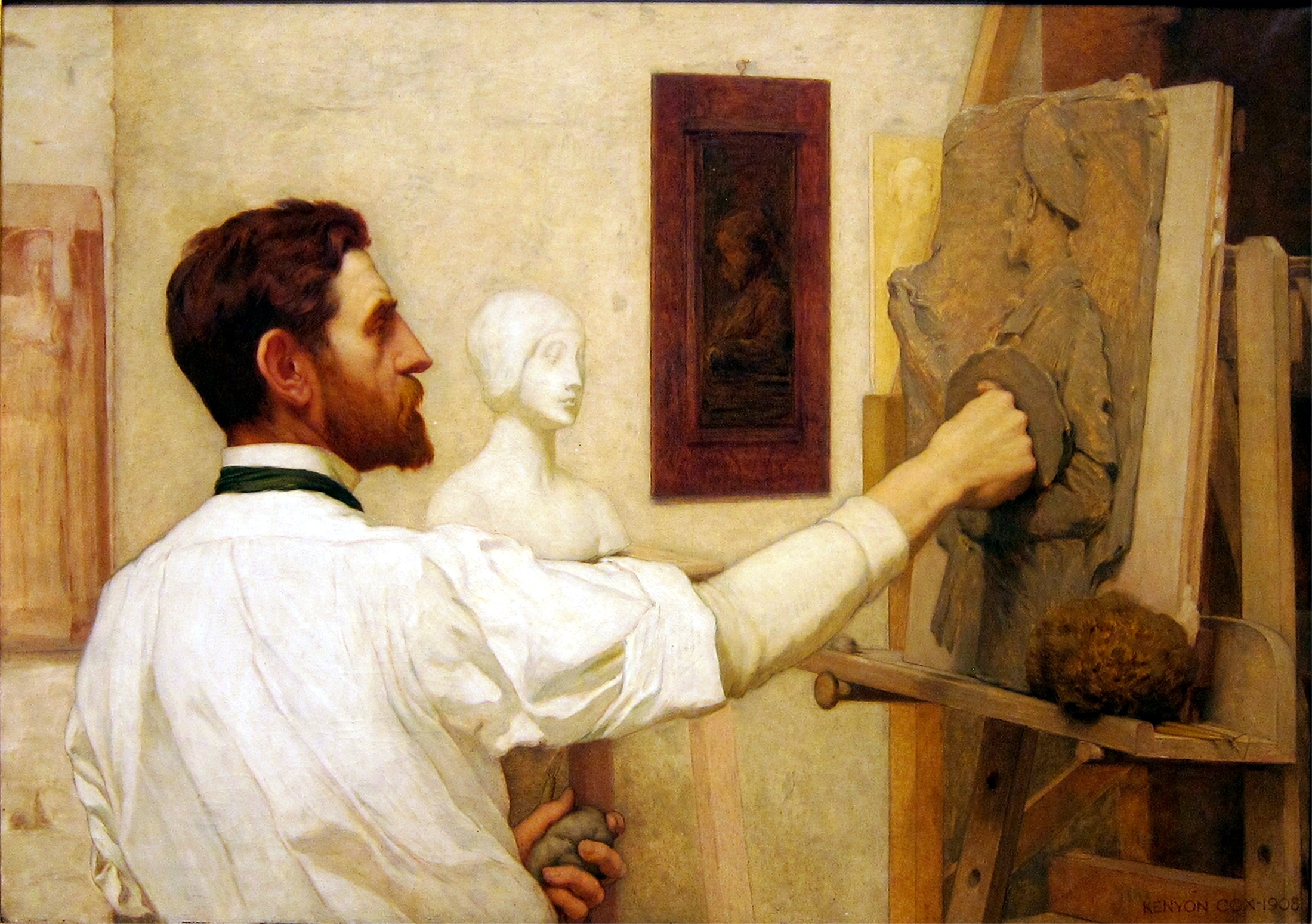
Kenyon Cox, Portrait of Augustus Saint-Gaudens, 1908, oil on canvas, Metropolitan Museum of Art, New York City

Kenyon Cox (October 27, 1856 – March 17, 1919) was an American painter, illustrator, muralist, writer, and teacher. Cox was an influential and important early instructor at the Art Students League of New York. He was the designer of the League's logo, whose motto is Nulla Dies Sine Linea or No Day Without a Line.

== Biography ==
Cox was born in Warren, Ohio, the son of Jacob Dolson Cox and Helen Finney Cox. As a young adult, he studied art at Cincinnati's Art Academy of Cincinnati (formerly known as the McMicken School of Art), but soon became aware of the lack of opportunity and artistic presence in Cincinnati. After visiting the Centennial Exposition in Philadelphia, he decided that Philadelphia and the art academy there had much more to offer him than Cincinnati did. Cox enrolled in the Pennsylvania Academy of Fine Arts hoping to receive better instruction and eventually secure for himself a way to study in Europe.

=== Paris and travels ===
In 1877 Cox moved to Paris like many American artists of the day to be a part of what he believed to be a sort of second renaissance in art. There he studied at the studio of Carolus-Duran and then under Alexandre Cabanel and Jean-Léon Gérôme at the École des Beaux-Arts. Cox wrote of his initial impression of Paris saying that there was "so much artistic material here that one might almost be content to stay here and paint for years…One can't dive down a crooked street or turn a sharp corner without finding more to paint than he could by hunting months for a subject in America. If Paris is at all like this it must indeed be a paradise for artists."

Cox first studied under Carolus-Duran. Soon after, Cox began to get irritated with Duran. During the winter of 1877-78 Cox wrote to his father about Duran stating that, "I appreciate his strong color, breadth, etc., etc. But I thought you would like to know just how he impressed me, and I must say that a predominating vulgarity grates on me."

Soon after writing this, Cox left the instruction of Carolus-Duran and enrolled in the École des Beaux-Arts. His painting teachers at the school included Alexandre Cabanel and Jean-Léon Gérôme.

While in Europe, Cox took the opportunity to travel throughout France and Italy and see the works of the Renaissance Masters. Later he wrote of his travels saying, "The trip, I think, did more to broaden and define my notions of art than anything that ever happened to me before."

=== New York ===
In 1882 Cox left Paris and moved to New York where he continued to paint. He also began to do many illustrations, mostly to pay the bills. Cox became well established as a magazine illustrator. His illustrations reached a much wider audience than did his paintings.

Cox also began to write art criticisms (unsigned) for the New York Evening Post. This and other writing jobs took his time away from painting but also helped him make a living.

Cox continued to live and work in New York for most of his life. He became an influential and important teacher at the Art Students League of New York. Cox designed the League's logo that reads Nulla Dies Sine Linea or No Day Without a Line. In 1900 he was elected into the National Academy of Design as an Associate Academician, and became a full Academician in 1903.

Cox was one of the founders and the secretary of the National Free Arts League, and was a member of the Society of American Artists, the National Academy of Design, and the American Academy of Arts and Letters and served as president of the National Society of Mural Painters from 1915 to 1919.

=== A Student's Memory ===
Cox made a profound impact on the lives and careers of his students, who included Philadelphia-based painter Margaretta S. Hinchman and artist Jerome Myers, who studied with Cox during his early years of training at the Art Student's League. Though Myers later took a very different path in his own artistic work, he clearly recalled this teacher in his 1940 autobiography, "Artist In Manhattan":

Kenyon Cox belongs eminently to the traditions of my student days. At his art lectures I remember his eulogies of Michelangelo. Once he remarked that the master slept with his boots on–-which sounds so much more imposing than to sleep with one's shoes on, as I have done. In our life classroom at the old Art Students League, there was a study by Kenyon Cox of a nude girl with red hair, a magnificent example, in oils, of vital life in the raw, an unforgettable canvas. It had a hole in it when I last saw it, and I do not know what became of it. In his mature work, however, Kenyon Cox sought for classic dignity; I remember a picture of his, called "The Flight of the Ideal," that seemed to me a symbol of his aspirations. For myself, on the contrary, it was the earth that was attractive, the depicting of humans of my choice. Yet my study of the antique at art school made me sympathetic to this earnest devotee of classicism.

=== Artistic theory ===
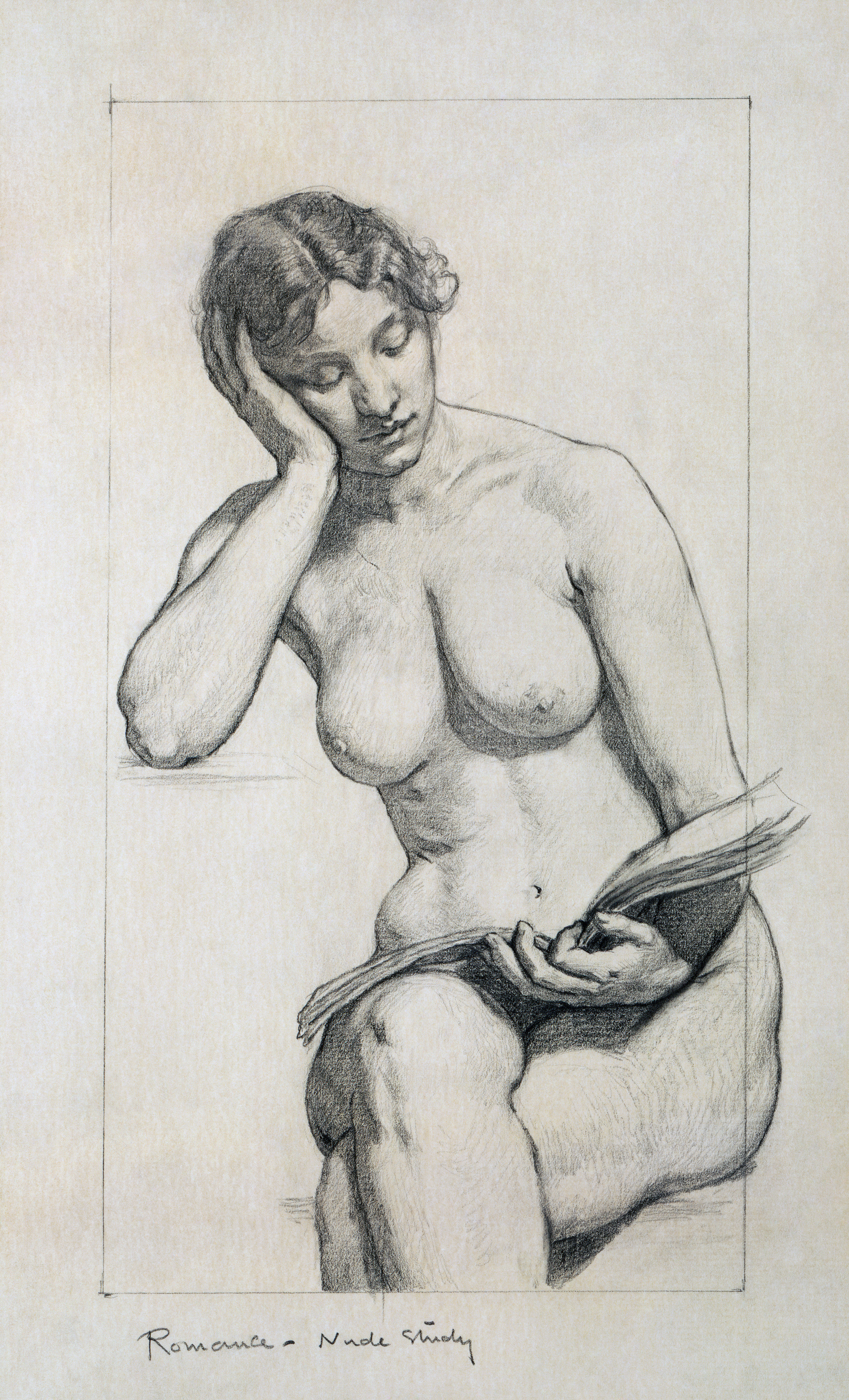
Nude study in graphite; preparatory drawing for the allegorical figure of Romance in The Arts mural at the Library of Congress Jefferson Building. Drawing created 1896, digitally restored.

Cox's art was very different from the cubist, neo-impressionist, fauvist, expressionist and modernist styles that emerged during his lifetime. He advocated careful drawing and modulated color, and he frequently used allegory and symbolism to present his ideas. Kenyon Cox painted in the realistic manner and earned a reputation for landscapes, portraits and genre studies. His idealized nudes and traditional treatment of classical themes had little in common with the popular avant-garde art of the day. Later, in 1912, Cox wrote an article for The Metropolitan Museum of Art Bulletin called "Two Ways of Painting". In this article he describes the difference between the figurative art he was making and the more fashionable abstract art or representational art. In the article he tells of the prejudice he felt as a more traditional figurative artist:

The pressure to conformity is upon the other side and it is the older methods that need justification and explanation. The prejudices of the workers and the writers have gradually and naturally become the prejudices of at least a part of the public, and it have become necessary to show that the small minority of artists who still follow the old roads do so, not from ignorance or stupidity or a stolid conservatism, still less from willful caprice, but from necessity; because those roads are the only ones that can lead them where they wish to go.

Cox, adamantly loyal to the preservation of the "older methods", set himself in opposition to modern styles. In his 1917 book Concerning Painting: Considerations Theoretical and Historical, Cox restated his earlier feelings about the "Two Ways of Painting" saying:

For at least fourteen thousand years, then, from the time of the cavemen to our own day, painting has been an imitative art, and it seems likely that it will continue to be so. That it should, within a few years, entirely reverse its current, and should flow in the opposite direction for thousands of years to come seems highly improbable, not to say incredible. Yet we are gravely told that it is about to do this; that, at the hands of its representative element, reached its final and definite form, and that no further changes are possible. Henceforth, as long as men live in the world they are to be satisfied with a non-representative art — an art fundamentally different from that which they have known and practiced and enjoyed.

Cox wrote extensively to persuade the art world and the public to embrace traditional, representational art.

=== Murals ===
Kenyon Cox, Panel of the Sciences, Library of Congress, Washington, D.C.

Kenyon Cox began to focus more on mural painting after the 1893 World's Columbian Exposition in Chicago. Cox painted murals in the state capitol buildings of Des Moines, St. Paul and Madison as well as other courthouses, libraries and college buildings. In 1896-97 Cox painted murals in the Library of Congress in Washington, D.C. Cox also made numerous mosaics for places like the Wisconsin State Capitol building.

In 1910 Kenyon Cox was awarded the Medal of Honor for mural painting by the Architectural League. He also served as president of the National Society of Mural Painters from 1915 to 1919.

=== Poetry ===
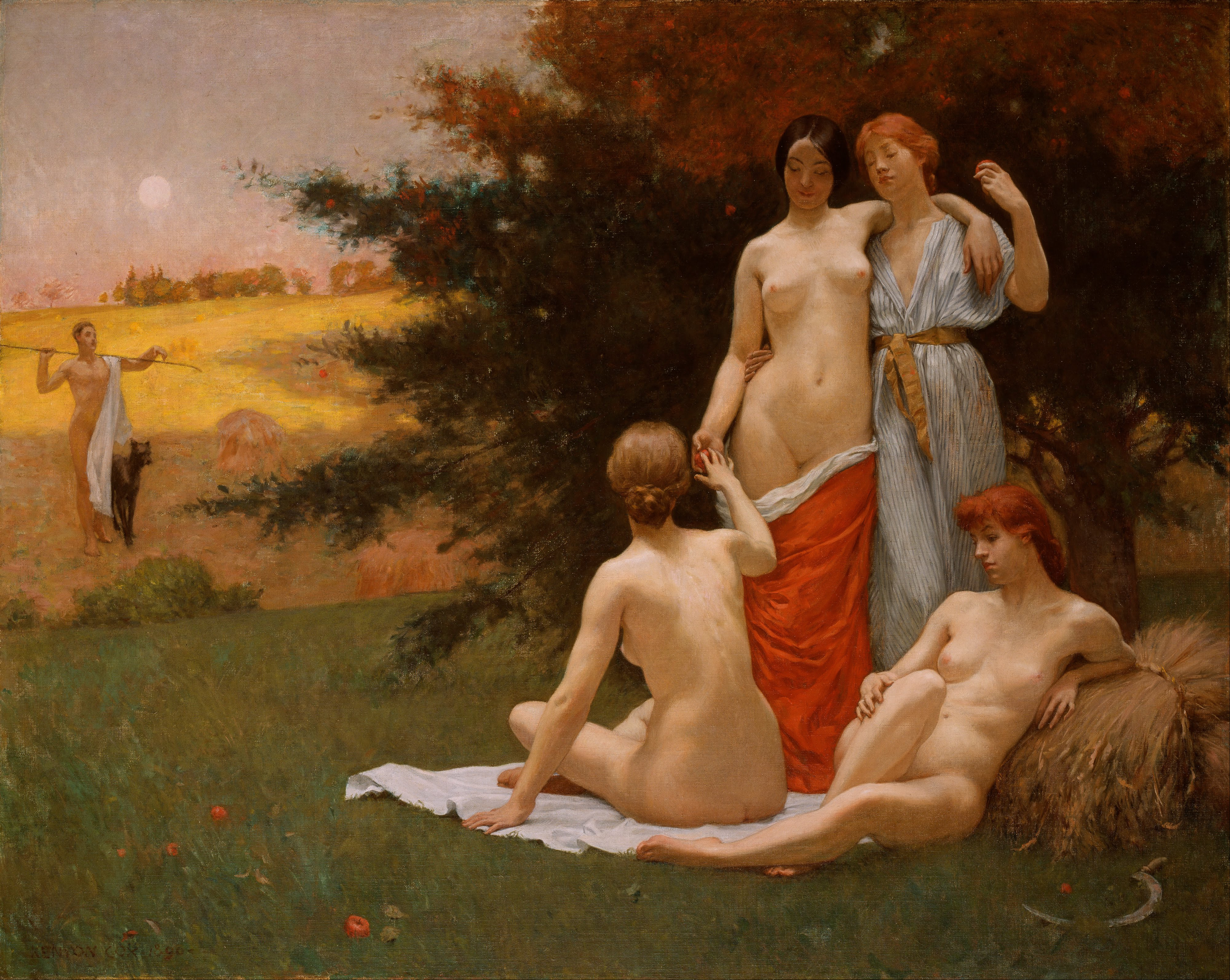
Kenyon Cox, An Eclogue, 1890, oil on canvas, Smithsonian American Art Museum, Washington, D.C.

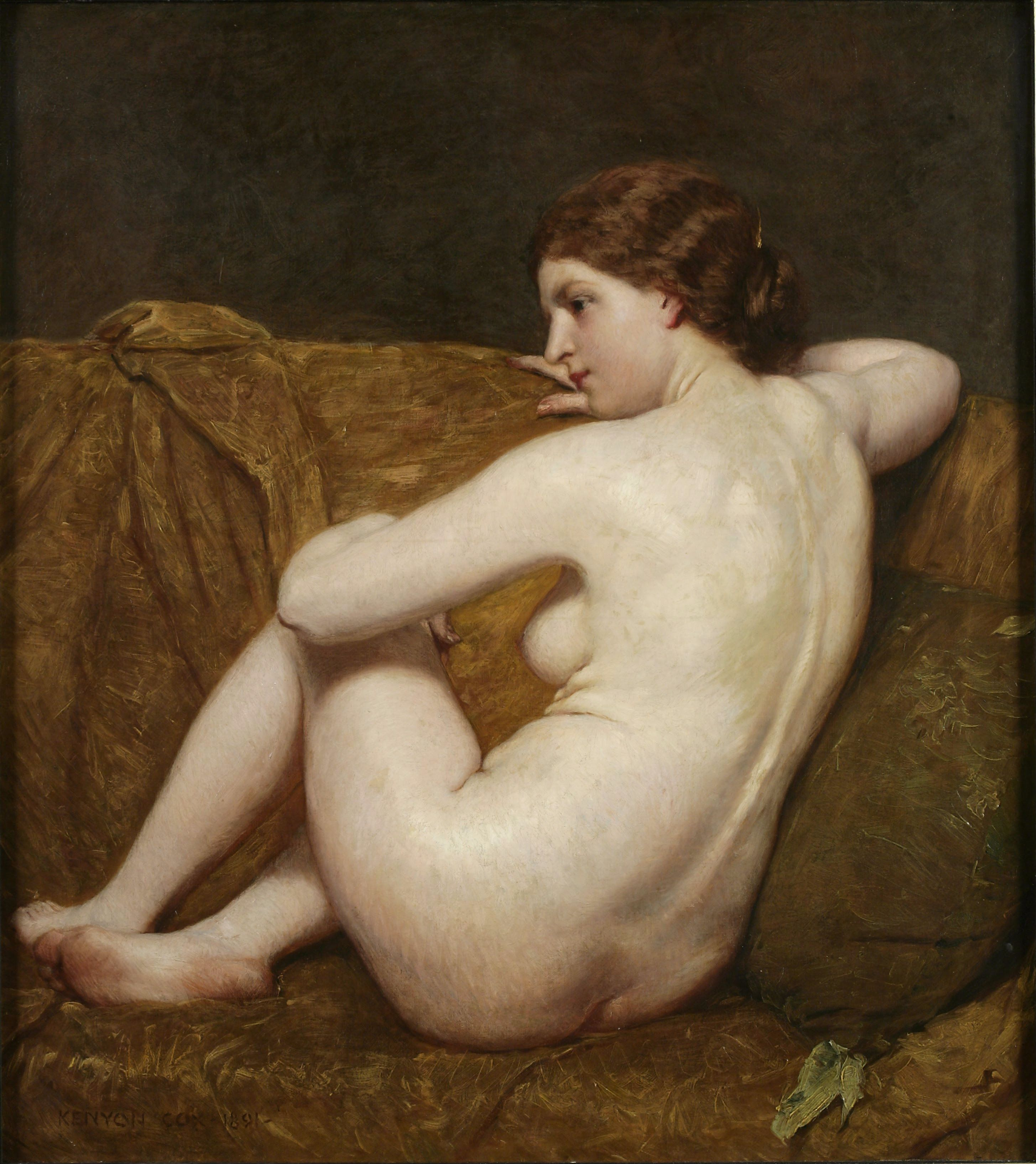
Kenyon Cox, A Blonde, 1891, oil on canvas, National Academy of Design, New York City

Kenyon Cox also began to write more articles and became an art critic for numerous magazines in New York including The Nation, Century and Scribner's. In the summer of 1883 Cox began to write poetry for the public:

She lived in Florence centuries ago,
That lady smiling there.
What her name or rank I do not know—
I know that she was fair.

For some great man — his name, like hers, forgot
And faded from Men's sight—
Loved her — he must have loved her — and has wrought
This bust for our delight.

Whether he gained her love or had her scorn
Full happy was his fate.
He saw her, heard her speak; he was not born
Four hundred years too late.

The palace throngs in every room but this —
Here I am left alone.
Love, there is none to see — I press a kiss
Upon thy lips of stone.

This poem was a big success in New York City art circles and earned Cox a great deal of attention. According to Wayne H. Morgan who wrote the book, Kenyon Cox : a Life in American Art 1856-1919, "The poem and its Unknown Lady symbolized the need among artists, especially those with classical interests, for intense emotion expressed through acceptable forms, and for the idealization of women." Cox himself painted many idealized women mostly in the form of the classic nude.

In 1895 Cox published another poem, "The Gospel of Art", that summarized his idealism about the artist's role in the intensifying emotion through sacrifice, and on the function of art in culture:

Work thou for pleasure; paint or sing or carve
The thing thou lovest, though the body starve.
Who works for glory misses oft the goal;
Who works for money coins his very soul;
Work for the work's sake, then, and it may be
That these things shall be added unto thee.

In 1904 Cox wrote the book Mixed Beasts where he combined the names of different beasts he believed flowed together to form another name like Bumblebeaver or Kangarooster. He then made up short poems to go with each new beast. In 2005 a new version of Mixed Beasts was released. It still contained most of Cox's original verses but also included input and illustrations by Wallace Edwards.

=== Marriage ===
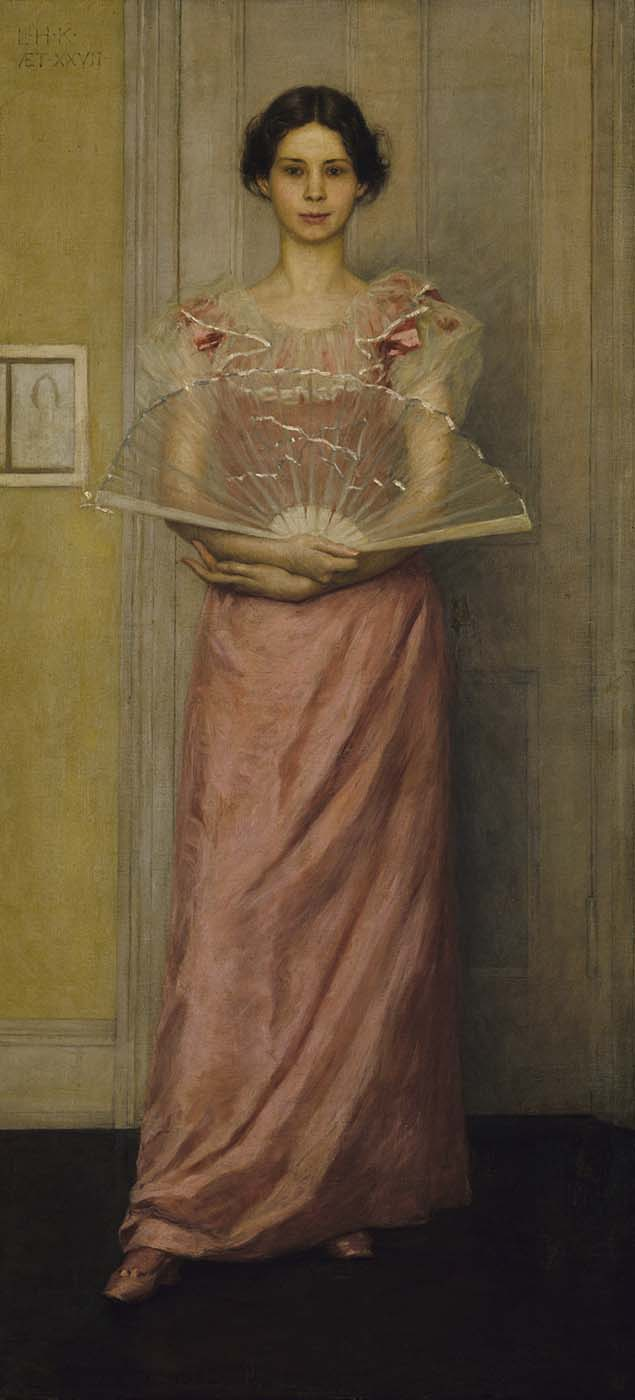
Kenyon Cox, Portrait of Louise Howland King Cox, 1892, Smithsonian American Art Museum, Washington, D.C.

While working in New York, Cox began to teach at the Art Student League. One of his female students, Louise Howland King from San Francisco, caught Cox's eye and they began to correspond outside of class. In an early letter to Louise, Cox tried to convince her to persist with her art, writing: "We must work for the work's sake. You say you almost forget why you paint at all; well, I have long since satisfied myself that I paint because I cannot help it—because I love the work itself and would rather be a miserably bad painter than a successful man in any other work—because the mere joy of trying and even the excitement of failure are the only true pleasures for me."

On June 30, 1892, thirty-six-year-old Cox married twenty-seven-year-old Louise Howland King. The pair executed the murals that decorated the Liberal Arts Building at the 1893 Columbian Exposition in Chicago. They had three children. Leonard, born in 1894 and named after Leonard Opdycke, was a World War I war hero and had a career in city planning and architecture. Son Allyn, born two years later, became an artist, particularly noted for his mural paintings, and an interior decorator. Daughter Caroline born in 1898 was also a talented artist.

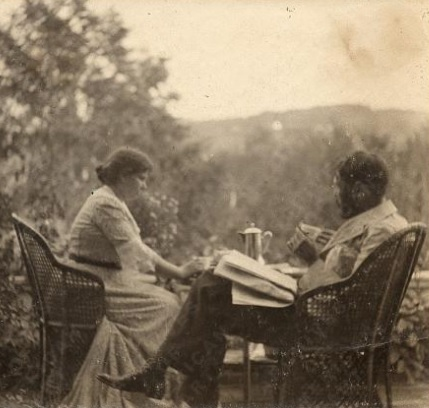
Louise and Kenyon Cox, 1896

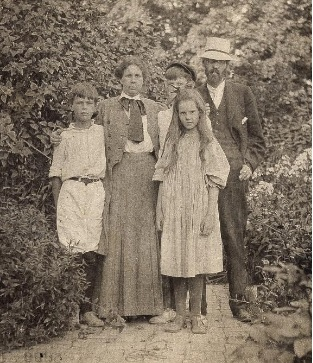
Allyn, Louise, Leonard, Caroline and Kenyon Cox, about 1906

=== Later years ===
Cox continued to paint, teach and write until his death on March 17, 1919. Kenyon Cox died in his New York home from pneumonia. A significant body of Cox's personal and professional papers, including extensive correspondence, is held in the Department of Drawings & Archives at the Avery Architectural and Fine Arts Library at Columbia University in New York City.

== Selected works ==
- After Boltraffio, "Sacre Conversazione", (oil on canvas) 1878–1882, owned by the Smithsonian American Art Museum, Washington, D.C.
- Study for Mosaic, Wisconsin State Capital, "Justice", (oil on canvas) 1913, owned by the Smithsonian American Art Museum, Washington, D.C.
- Mural at Oberlin College, "The Spirit of Self-Sacrificing Love", 1914
- "The Sword is Drawn The Navy Uphold it!" United States Navy recruitment poster, 1917

== Select writings ==
- Old Masters and New, 1905
- Painters and Sculptors, 1907
- Concerning Painting: Considerations Theoretical and Historical, 1917
