= Allyn Cox =

American painter

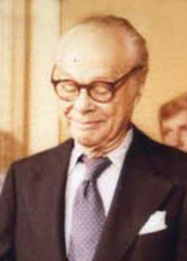
- Cox in 1981
- Born: June 5, 1896
- Died: September 26, 1982 (aged 86)
- Education: National Academy of Design, Art Students League of New York, American Academy in Rome

Allyn Cox (June 5, 1896 – September 26, 1982) was an American artist known for his murals, including those on display in the United States Capitol, the U.S. Department of State, and the George Washington Masonic National Memorial.

== Early life and education ==
Cox was a son of Kenyon Cox and his wife, the former Louise Howland King, both of whom were artists. His siblings were Leonard and Caroline.

He studied at the National Academy of Design and Art Students League of New York in New York City, and the American Academy in Rome. In 1940, he was elected into the National Academy of Design as an associate academician, and became a full academician in 1962.

== Career ==
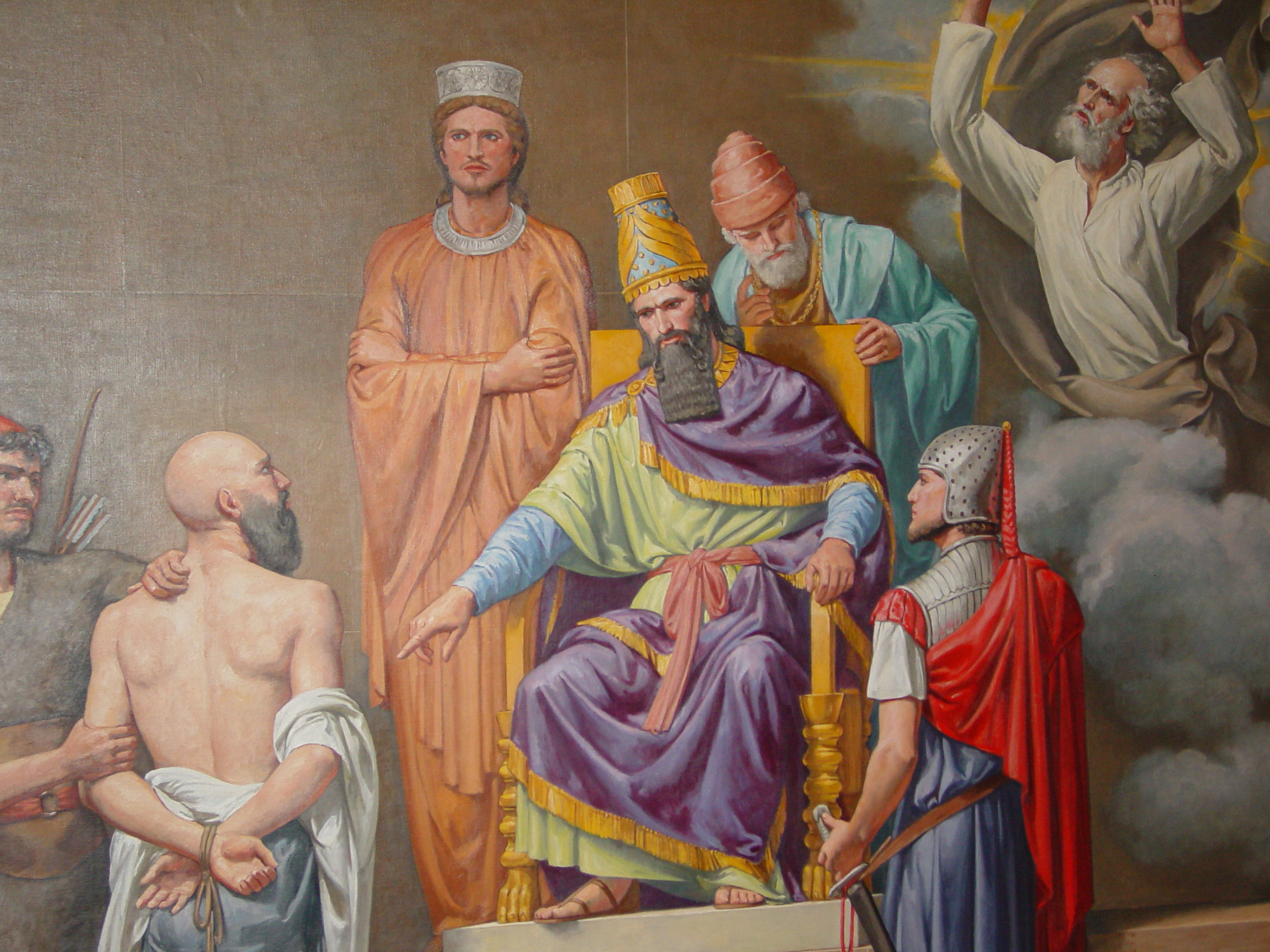
Mural in the George Washington Masonic National Memorial

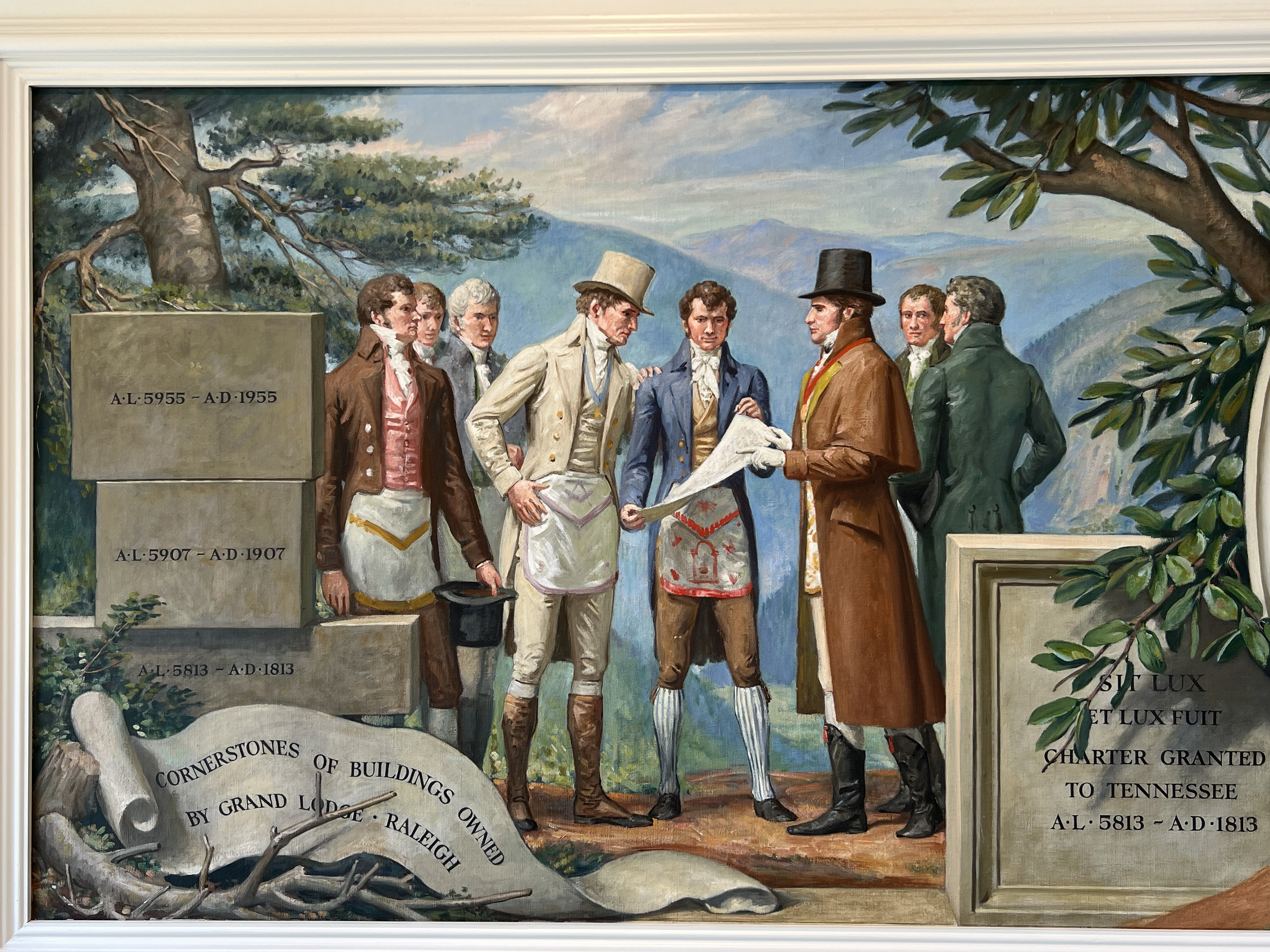
Section of the Mural depicting the release of Tennessee to form a Grand Lodge in 1813

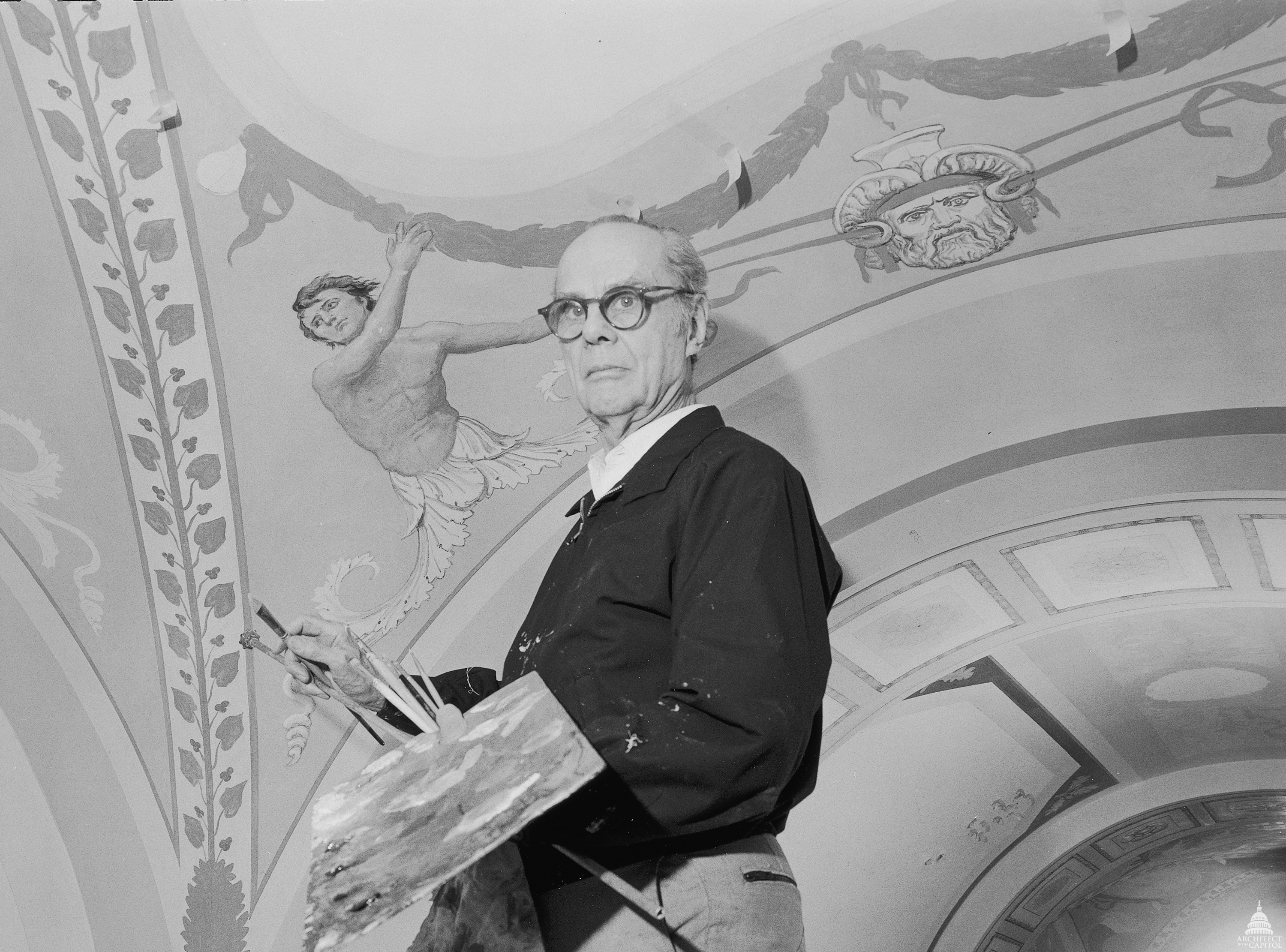
Cox at work on one of his many murals at the United States Capitol

Cox apprenticed with his father, who he worked with when working on murals for the Wisconsin State Capitol. His first solo mural may have been over the fireplace at the Windsor Public Library. Like his father, he served as the president of the National Society of Mural Painters.

In 1953, he was hired to complete the frieze in the Capitol Rotunda, which had been originally started by Constantino Brumidi and left unfinished since the 1880s. He painted murals on many other walls in the building, including a depiction of the first landing on the Moon in the Senate's Brumidi Corridors of the Capitol. Starting in 1971, Cox designed and painted two of the three Cox Corridors in the Capitol, while the third was completed following his designs after his death.

Some of his work may be seen at the George Washington Masonic National Memorial in Alexandria, Virginia. He also painted murals in houses owned by Anne (Mrs. William K.) Vanderbilt and Lincoln Ellsworth.

In 1956, he was hired to design and paint two long rectangular murals for the new headquarters of the North Carolina Grand Lodge of Ancient, Free and Accepted Masons. The murals depict major events in the history of North Carolina Masons from the 1750s onward. These were completed in August 1959, transported to the building, unrolled, and mounted to the north and south walls of the main hall.

He served as president of the National Society of Mural Painters from 1942 to 1946 and again from 1960 to 1963.

== Personal life ==
On April 30, 1927, Cox married Ethel Julia Howard Potter, a daughter of Howard Nott Potter and a great-niece of Henry Codman Potter, Episcopal Bishop of New York. His wife's uncle by marriage was society architect William Adams Delano. Cox died of a stroke in 1982.
