= May Night (Willard Metcalf painting) =

1906 painting by Willard Metcalf

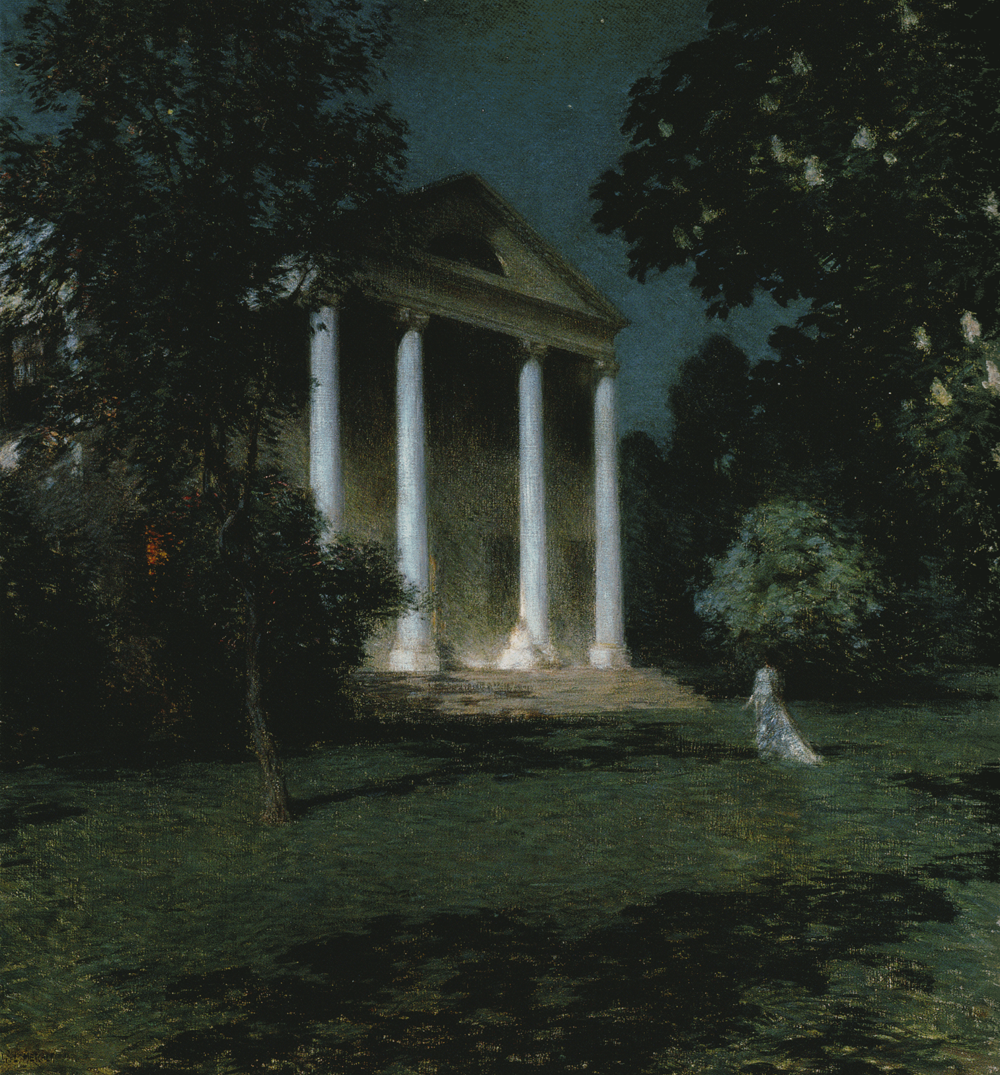
- Artist: Willard Metcalf
- Year: 1906
- Medium: Oil on canvas
- Dimensions: 99.5 cm x 91.8 cm
- Location: National Gallery of Art, Washington, DC.

May Night is a 1906 oil painting by American Impressionist Willard Metcalf. It is a nocturne depicting the home of Florence Griswold, now the Florence Griswold Museum in Old Lyme, Connecticut. It was the first contemporary painting purchased by the Corcoran Gallery of Art, and is Metcalf's "most celebrated work."

== Background ==
Metcalf arrived at the Old Lyme Art Colony at the invitation of his friend Childe Hassam, and summered there from 1905 to 1907. During the spring, summer and autumn of 1906 Metcalf enjoyed what was to that point his most productive year, finishing twenty-six paintings. With greater productivity as a landscape painter came an increased exploration of different themes, seasons, and times of day. One of the themes that Metcalf attempted was the nocturne, a subject which had become popular in the Old Lyme colony of artists. The subject's romantic associations and subtle color harmonies reconciled the opposing tendencies of Tonalism and Impressionism within the colony. By 1903 Frank DuMond had begun teaching the painting of moonlight subjects to his students in Old Lyme, and the theme was popular as a studio alternative to painting outdoors in poor weather. In July 1906 Hassam wrote about Metcalf to J. Alden Weir: "Metty is working hard at a moonlight. We are all doing moonlights. The weather has been so bad that we have been forced to it."

Metcalf began painting May Night in the spring of 1906, and finished it in early September. The subject is the front lawn and facade of the Griswold House, its Ionic columns seen in an atmospheric moonlight. In the foreground, shadows are cast on the lawn by trees. Touches of warmth are provided by the light emanating from within the house. Two figures are present: One woman walks across the lawn toward the house while another sits on the front porch, each of them clad in long pale dresses, which, for Metcalf biographer Bruce W. Chambers, heighten "the feeling of elegant tranquility."

== Impact ==
May Night romanticized the condition of the property, which at the time suffered from peeling paint and uncut shrubbery. It also acknowledged the centrality of Florence Griswold to the creative community. According to Arthur Heming, whom Metcalf invited to view the painting soon after it was completed, the figure walking toward the house was intended to be Florence Griswold. As he admired the painting in Metcalf's studio, Miss Florence entered. Metcalf attempted to give her the painting in return for room and board, and she refused, saying "It's the best thing you've ever done. When you show it in New York, they'll snap it up at once, and everything will be lovely."

The painting soon had a profound impact on Metcalf's career, and on the Old Lyme colony. It was exhibited in November at the St. Botolph Club in Boston, and in January 1907 at the Corcoran Gallery's inaugural exhibition of contemporary art. There it was awarded the Clark Gold Medal and $1,000, and was bought by the Corcoran for $3,000, thus becoming the gallery's first purchase of a contemporary American painting. As a result of the publicity from the exhibitions and sale of May Night, Metcalf's reputation, already well established, benefited both financially and critically: "From this time he was an acclaimed master of the Impressionist landscape." After seeing the painting in Boston in November 1906, artist and critic Philip Leslie Hale wrote "One could hardly get a stronger sense of the beauty and mystery of night and springtime ... all changed to something new and strange by the magic of dim reflected light of the moon." A critic in the Art Annual wrote "It is a little weird, and like a dream, but immensely interesting."

The effect of Metcalf's new-found prosperity on the Old Lyme colony was chronicled the following year, when Lillian Baynes Griffin, wife of painter Walter Griffin, wrote in the Hartford Daily Courant, "The art colony has steadily grown since the first few painters chose it as a sketching ground, but never before has there been such a sudden demand for every inch of available space as there is this year ... Lyme cows are so busy posing for the Art classes that they have hardly time to be milked ... One explanation of the remarkable jump Lyme has taken is that Willard Metcalf sold in three days $3,000 worth of Lyme landscapes in the St. Botolph Club last winter. This made Lyme landscapes sound like Standard Oil, and with no less enthusiasm than the gold hunters of '49, the picture makers have chosen Lyme as a place in which to swarm." The influence of May Night was particularly strong: "Suddenly everyone wanted to paint his own May Night." Among the artists painting versions of the theme in 1907 were Will Howe Foote and Metcalf's former student Robert Nisbet, who eloped with Metcalf's wife Marguerite in July of that year.

May Night was the centerpiece of a 2005 exhibition of Metcalf's works at the Florence Griswold Museum. Concurrently, an eponymously titled song was featured in a musical inspired by Florence Griswold.
