= Clark Voorhees =

American painter (1871–1933)

Clark Greenwood Voorhees
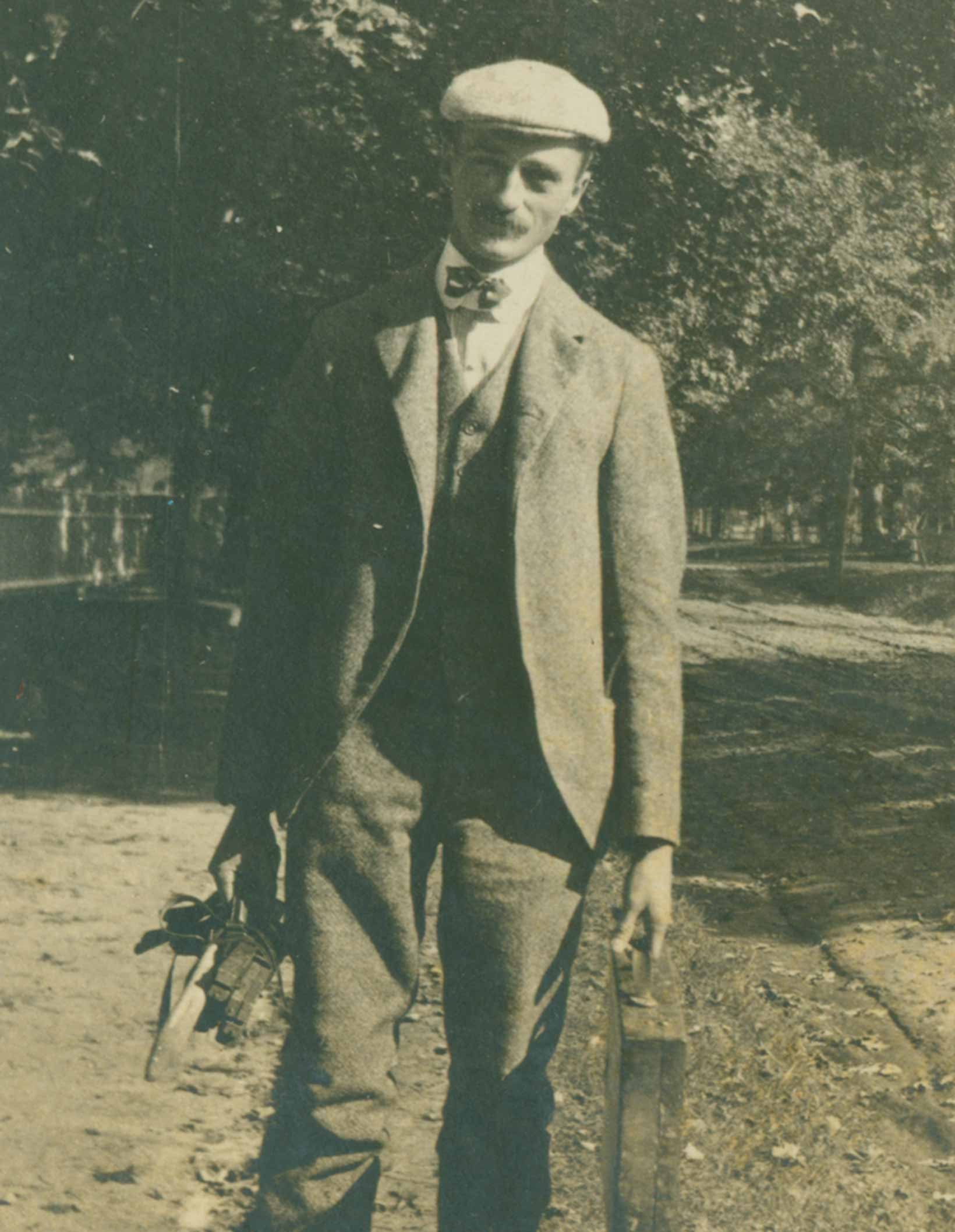
- Born: May 29, 1871; New York City
- Died: July 17, 1933 (aged 62); Old Lyme, Connecticut
- Occupations: American Impressionist and Tonalist landscape painter

Clark Greenwood Voorhees (1871 – 1933) was an American Impressionist and Tonalist landscape painter and one of the founders of the Old Lyme Art Colony.

== Biography ==
The son of a stockbroker, Voorhees was born on May 29, 1871, in New York City. He was initially drawn to the sciences and earned degrees in chemistry from Yale and Columbia University. In 1894, Voorhees began to seriously pursue fine art (which had always been a hobby) when he enrolled in classes at the Art Students League. The following year, Voorhees enrolled at the Metropolitan School of Fine Art. He also studied with Irving Ramsey Wiles on Long Island and with Leonard Ochtman in Connecticut. In 1897, Voorhees traveled to Europe, studying with Benjamin Constant and J. P. Laurens at the Académie Julian in Paris and spending time in the French village of Barbizon as well as in the Netherlands.

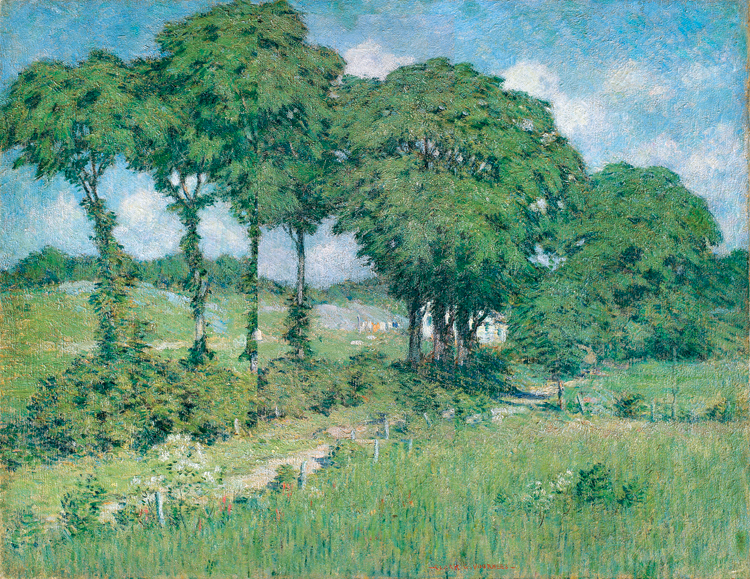
Sill Lane, Old Lyme

Voorhees first visited Old Lyme, Connecticut in 1893, while on a bicycling trip. In 1896, he returned with his mother and sister, who stayed at an informal boarding house run by Florence Griswold. The Florence Griswold House (now the Florence Griswold Museum ) would eventually become the center of Old Lyme's artistic community and it is very likely that Henry Ward Ranger, often described as the Old Lyme colony's founder, was introduced to both Old Lyme and the Griswold House through Voorhees.

Stylistically, Voorhees was one of the Old Lyme artists who remained at least somewhat loyal to the Barbizon-derived, Tonalist style associated with Ranger even after the majority had adopted Childe Hassam's Impressionist style. Most of Voorhees's paintings are undated, but it appears that he gradually adopted a more Impressionistic approach later in life. He also experimented with etching in the 1930s.

Many of Voorhees's paintings depict Old Lyme prospects. Bermuda scenes are also common—beginning in 1919, Voorhees and his family wintered there. He also painted in Newport, Rhode Island and in Western Massachusetts (his wife was from Lenox).

Vorhees exhibited along with other members of the Old Lyme Art Colony as well as at the National Academy of Design, the Society of American Artists, the American Watercolor Society, the Carnegie Institute, and the Art Institute of Chicago. He was awarded a bronze medal at the 1904 St. Louis Exposition and in 1905 received one of the National Academy's three Hallgarten Prizes, honoring the best three oil paintings produced in the United States by artists under the age of thirty-five.

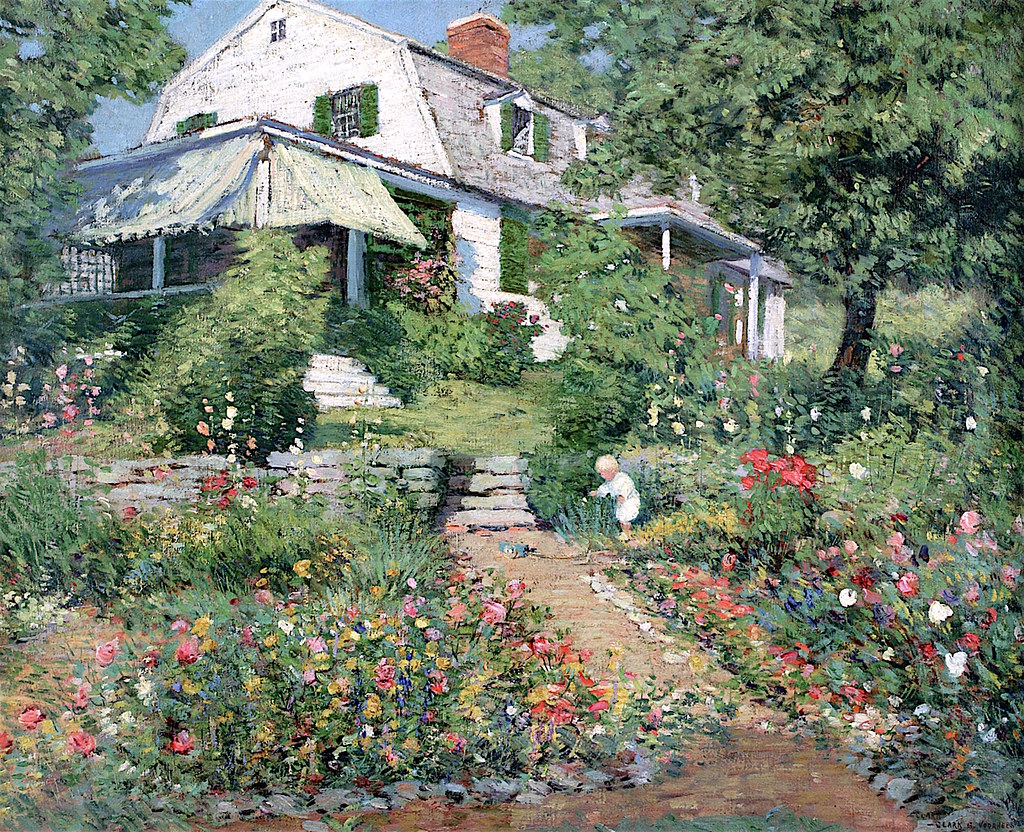
My Garden

Examples of Voorhees's work are in the collections of the Yale University Art Gallery, the Wadsworth Atheneum Museum of Art, the Museum of Fine Arts, Houston, the Florence Griswold Museum, and the Lyme Historical Society.

Major exhibitions featuring Voorhees's work have included the Lyme Historical Society and Florence Griswold Museum's Clark G. Voorhees, 1871–1933 (June 13 – August 30, 1981) and Hawthorne Fine Art's The Light Lies Softly: The Impressionist Art of Clark Greenwood Voorhees, 1871–1933 (December 15, 2009 – February 27, 2010).

He had a son, Clark Voorhees Jr. (1911–1980), who was also an artist, worked primarily in wood carving. His granddaughter, Janet Fish, is a still life painter with works in the permanent collection of many museums.
