= Harry Hoffman (painter) =

American painter

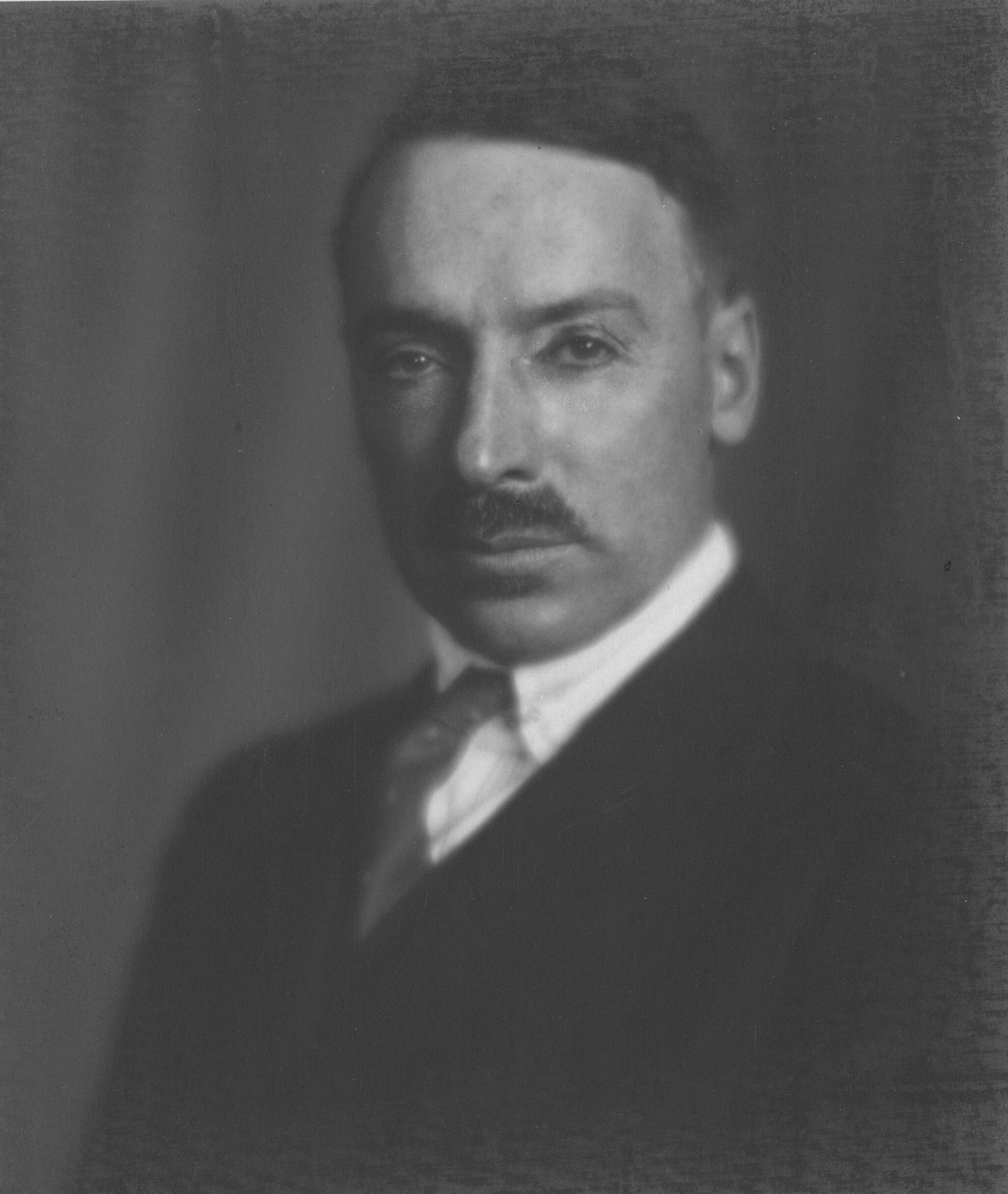

Harry Leslie Hoffman (1871–1964) was an American Impressionist painter most notable for his brightly colored paintings of underwater marine life.

== Life ==
Harry Leslie Morris Hoffman was born in Cressona, Pennsylvania. He attended the Yale University School of Art (1893–97), studying with John Ferguson Weir. He was also a champion gymnast during his college years. He then moved to New York, where he continued his training at the Art Students' League with Frank DuMond. He also spent time in Paris studying at the Académie Julian.

In the summer of 1902, Hoffman went to Old Lyme, Connecticut, to study at the Lyme Summer School of Art. Old Lyme was then a center of American Impressionism and known for its art colony. Three years later, Hoffman settled in Old Lyme, which remained his home until his death. He later helped to save Florence Griswold's house, which was a nucleus of the art colony, so that it could be converted into the Florence Griswold Museum.

In 1910, he married fellow artist Beatrice Pope; they had one child.

Hoffman often left New England in the winters, spending time in Georgia (1914, 1915) and the Bahamas (1916). In the early 1920s, he served as staff artist to the naturalist William Beebe on expeditions to the Galapagos Islands (1923), British Guiana, and Bermuda.

Hoffman died at 92, the longest-lived of the Old Lyme colony of Impressionists.

== Art ==
Early in his career, Hoffman focused on Impressionist landscapes, plein air figure studies, street scenes, and still lifes. His style was most strongly influenced by the work of fellow Old Lyme painter Willard Metcalf, though his color palette was brighter and his brushwork looser. After traveling to the Bahamas in 1916, he became interested in marine subjects and developed a special glass-bottomed bucket that allowed him to see potential underwater subjects more clearly. By the mid-1920s, he had developed a reputation for vividly colored underwater studies of fish and other marine life.

Hoffman was a member of many art organizations, including the Salmagundi Club and the New York Watercolor Club. He was elected to the National Academy of Design in 1930. He won a gold medal at the Panama Pacific Exposition in 1915. His work is held by museums throughout the United States.
