= PriceDoc.com =

- Type: Private
- Industry: healthcare
- Website: PriceDoc.com

PriceDoc.com is a company that operates a commercial website that helps consumers obtain discounted prices and reduced fees for healthcare procedures. PriceDoc.com is not a direct supplier of these services; instead it provides consumers comparative pricing information for various medical, dental, vision, chiropractic, cosmetic, medispa and allied health and elective procedures. Users are also able to review details about the provider's practice as well as their credentials.

== Background ==
PriceDoc.com is headquartered in Solana Beach, California. The PriceDoc.com business model was created by entrepreneurs Glenn Safadago and Pat Bradley. The underlying web based technology was conceived, developed, and prototyped by Dr Julian Henley and described in US Patent filing in Oct 2000. Patent application #09/725,142 titled "Method and System for Provision and Acquisition of Medical Services and Products". In September 2008, PriceDoc, Inc. was formed by a team of co-founders that merged their visions and include Glenn Safadago, Patrick Bradley, William Chadwick, Michael Stoop and Julian Henley, M.D.
