= Old Lyme art colony =

Art colony in Old Lyme, Connecticut, US

The Old Lyme art colony of Old Lyme, Connecticut was established in 1899 by American painter Henry Ward Ranger, and was in its time the most famous art colony in the United States, and the first to adopt Impressionism.

== History ==
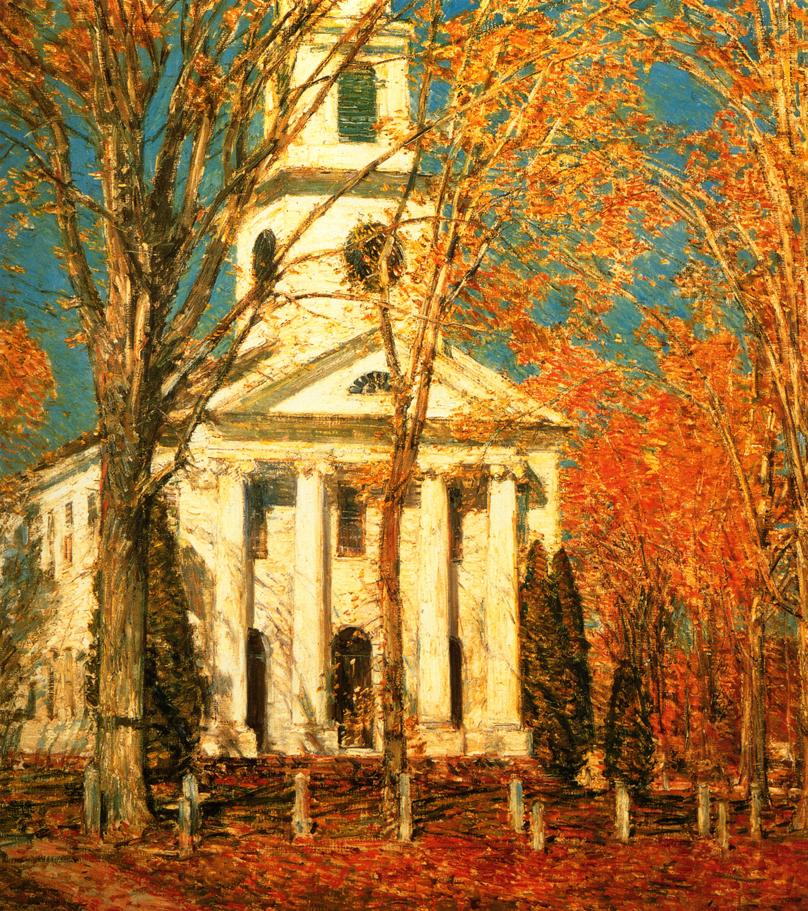
Church at Old Lyme, Childe Hassam, 1905. Albright-Knox Art Gallery, Buffalo, New York.

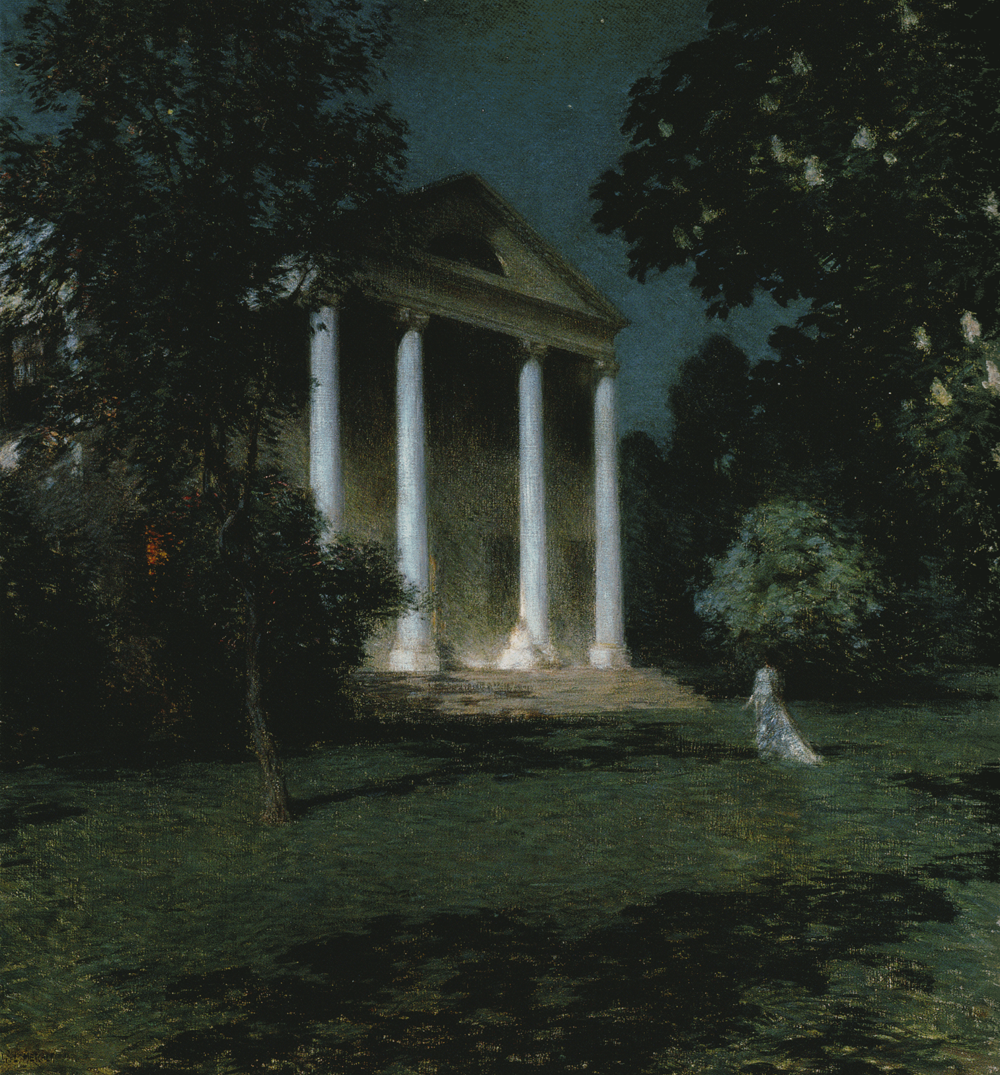
May Night, Willard Metcalf, 1906

Ranger began his American equivalent to the French Barbizon school, a similar seasonal retreat from less bucolic communities, in the modest boarding house of Florence Griswold, bringing fellow artists Lewis Cohen, Henry Rankin Poore, Louis Paul Dessar, and William Henry Howe in 1900. The group came to be dominated, socially and artistically, by Childe Hassam after his appearance in 1903.

The colony was important to the development of American Impressionism. Perhaps 200 painters passed through the colony during its height in the next 30 years. Many significant American Impressionist paintings of the era depict buildings in and around Old Lyme, notably the Old Lyme Congregational Church, painted by Hassam and others. The 1906 painting May Night by Willard Metcalf shows the boardinghouse by night, with a figure said to be Griswold herself. This was the first contemporary painting purchased by the Corcoran Gallery of Art.

Old Lyme remains a thriving art community. The Griswold House has been transformed into an art museum, the Florence Griswold Museum, affectionately called "Flo Gris", by local residents. The museum holds artists' work along with personal possessions of the artists who frequented there.

== Artists ==
Artists of the Old Lyme art colony include:

- Louis Betts
- Matilda Browne
- William Chadwick
- Bruce Crane
- Roger Wilson Dennis
- Frank DuMond
- Gladys Kelley Fitch
- Arthur Heming
- Harry Hoffman
- Wilson Irvine
- Tosca Olinsky
- Allen Butler Talcott
- Edward Charles Volkert
- Guy C. Wiggins
- Bessie Potter Vonnoh
- Robert Vonnoh
- Everett Warner
