= St. Botolph Club =

Private social club in Boston

The St. Botolph Club is a private social club in Boston, Massachusetts, founded in 1880 by a group including many artists. Its name is derived from the English saint Botolph of Thorney.

The St Botolph Club Foundation is a 501(c)(3) Public Charity affiliated with the club. In 2024, it reported total revenue of $222,262 and total assets of $1,557,584. The Club is itself organized under 501(c)(7) Social and Recreation Clubs; in 2024, it claimed total revenue of $1,907,843 and total assets of $3,223,417.

The club's activities in its quarters at 2 Newbury Street have included an extensive and long-running series of fine arts exhibits, particularly new work from painters of the American Impressionists: Dennis Miller Bunker, Dodge MacKnight, Joseph Thurman Pearson Jr. (in a 1912 dual exhibition with animalier sculptor Albert Laessle) and Willard Metcalf, who first showed his landscape May Night at the club in 1906. The club also exhibited work by Wilton Lockwood, Adelaide Cole Chase, Frances C. Houston, and the sculptor Bela Pratt. The Club also sponsored a baseball team that played against other Boston institutions such as the Tavern Club.

Among its members have been the architect Charles Follen McKim, Boston composer Frederick Converse, Sculptor Cyrus Dallin, artist William McGregor Paxton, and U.S. Army brigadier general Charles Brewster Wheeler.

Originally exclusively a men's club, the St. Botolph Club has been open to women since 1988 in advance of a Supreme Court ruling against sexual and racial discrimination in social clubs that would have mandated it.

The club appeared in fictionalized form as the "St. Filipe Club" in two novels written by Arlo Bates, The Pagans (1884) and The Philistines (1888).

Since 1972 at 199 Commonwealth Avenue, the club maintains reciprocal relationships with a large number of social clubs worldwide.

== See also ==
- List of American gentlemen's clubs
