= The Cornish Hills =

1911 painting by Willard Metcalf

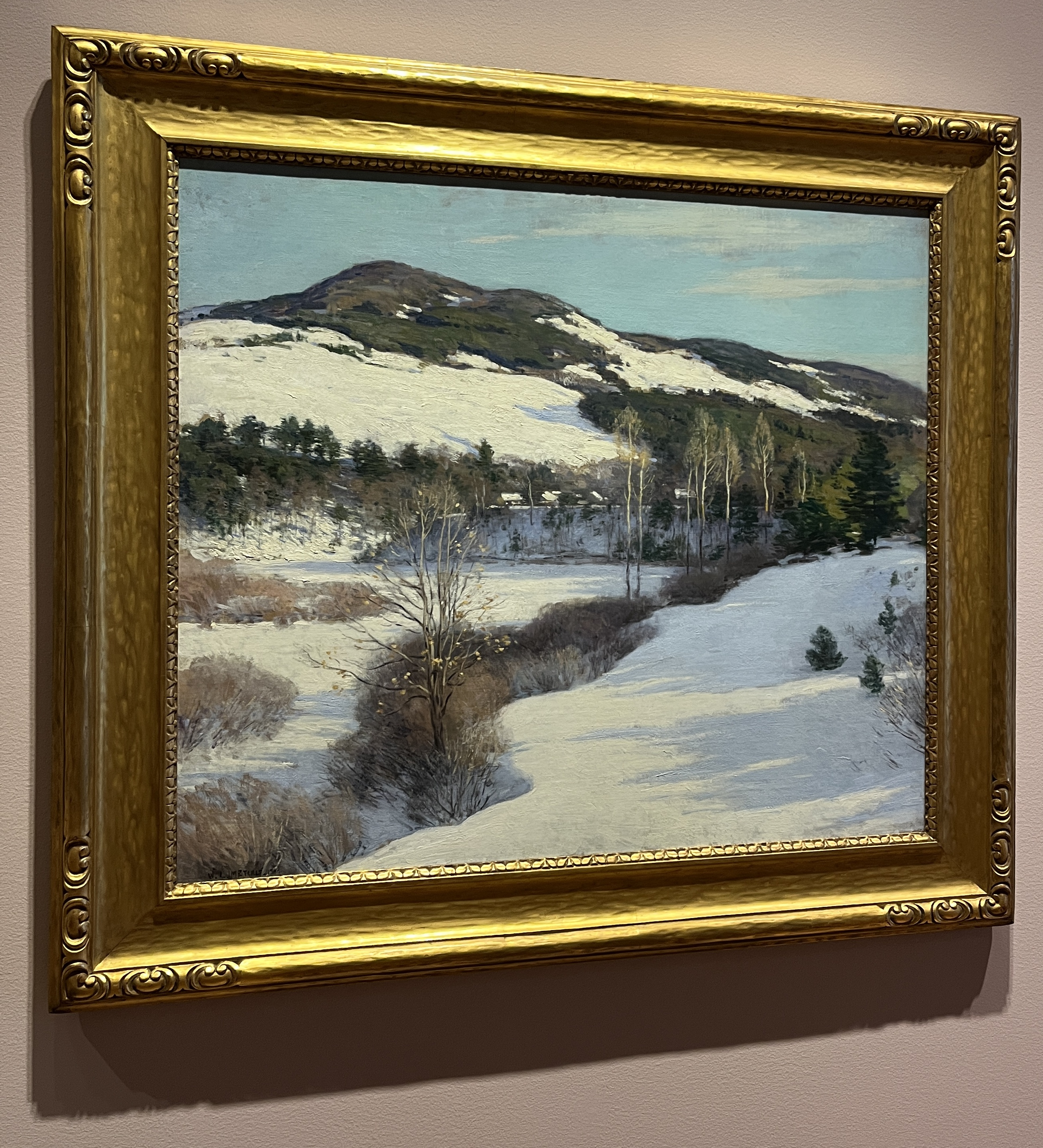
- The painting in the Seattle Art Museum, 2023
- Artist: Willard Metcalf
- Year: 1911
- Location: Seattle Art Museum, Seattle, Washington, U.S.

The Cornish Hills is a 1911 painting by Willard Metcalf. The artwork is part of the collection of the Seattle Art Museum.
