= Florence Griswold Museum =

- Florence Griswold House
- U.S. National Register of Historic Places
- U.S. National Historic Landmark
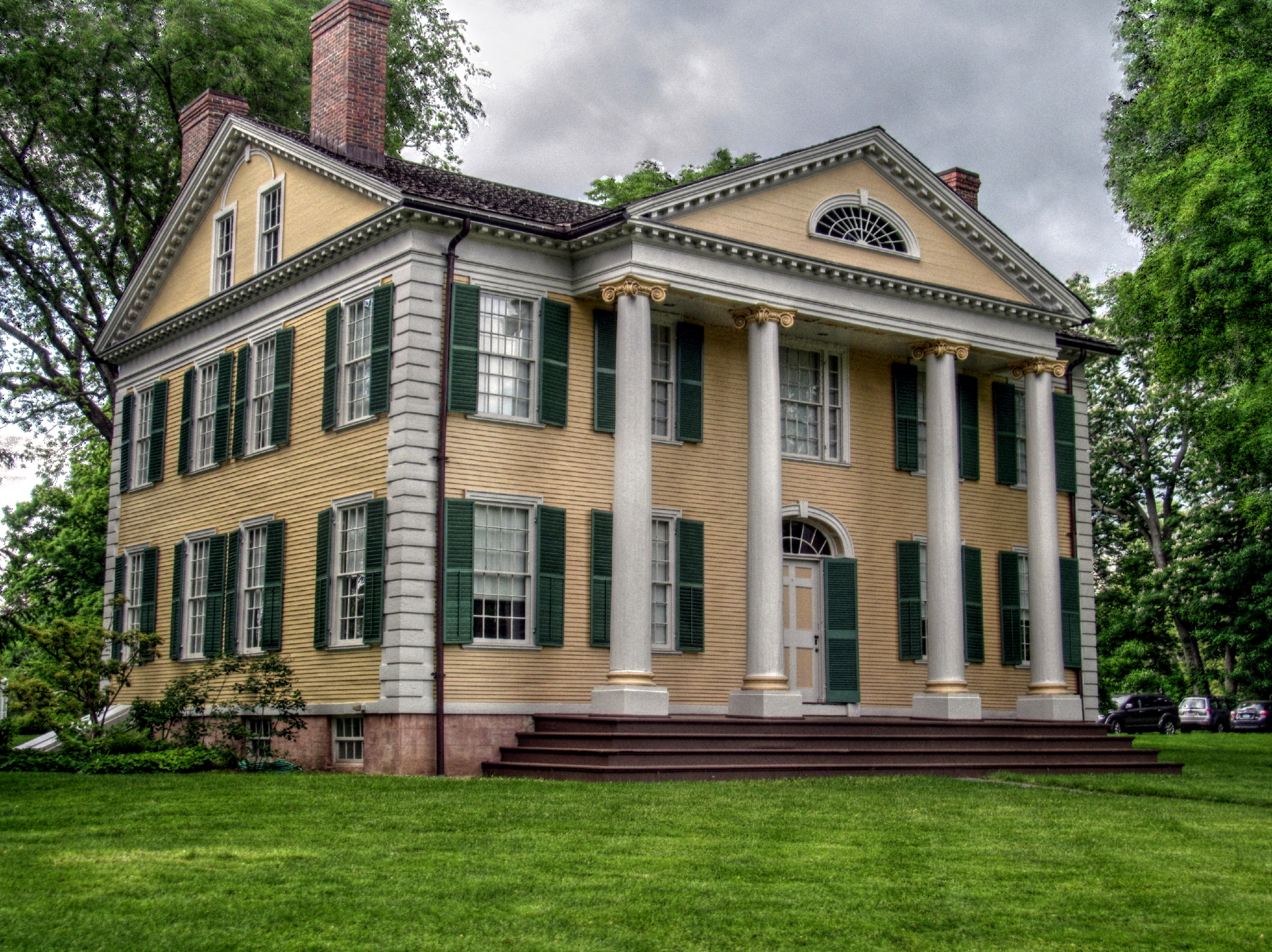
- Florence Griswold House in 2014

- Location within Connecticut Location within the United States
- Location: 96 Lyme Street, Old Lyme, Connecticut
- Coordinates: 41°19′32″N 72°19′39″W
- Built: 1817; 209 years ago
- Architect: Samuel Belcher
- Architectural style: Late Georgian
- Website: flogris.org
- NRHP reference No.: 93001604

Significant dates
- Added to NRHP: April 19, 1993
- Designated NHL: April 19, 1993

The Florence Griswold Museum is an art museum at 96 Lyme Street in Old Lyme, Connecticut, whose centerpiece is the former home of Florence Griswold (1850–1937). The house was once the epicenter of the Old Lyme Art Colony whose members (many of whom were Griswold's boarders) played an important role in the development of American Impressionism. The museum is noteworthy for its collection of American Impressionist paintings and a 12-acre site that includes contemporary and historic buildings, gardens, and walking trails.

== Museum ==
In 2001, the museum acquired the corporate collection of the Hartford Steam Boiler Inspection and Insurance Company, once the world's largest insurer against equipment breakdown. The collection included 157 oil paintings, 31 works on paper and 2 works of sculpture, all Connecticut-related.

In 2002, the museum opened the Robert and Nancy Krieble Gallery, a new building designed by Centerbrook Architects, with 9,500 square feet (880 m^{2}) of exhibit space and sweeping views of the Lieutenant River.

In 2018, the museum appointed Rebekah Beaulieu, Ph.D. to be the museum's Director, succeeding Jeffrey W. Andersen, who led the museum for 41 years. Beaulieu holds a bachelor's degree in American Studies from George Washington University, a master's degree in Art History and Museum Studies from the University of Wisconsin-Milwaukee, a master's degree in Arts Administration from Columbia University, and a Ph.D. in American and New England Studies from Boston University.

Joshua Campbell Torrance is the museum's Executive Director.

Collection highlights:

- Milton Avery, East Hartford Meadow, 1922
- Frederic Church, The Charter Oak at Hartford, 1846
- Childe Hassam, Summer Evening (A Woman at the Window), 1886
- David Johnson, View of Greenwich, Connecticut, 1878
- John F. Kensett, Shore of Darien, Connecticut, 1872
- Harlan Page (painter), Portrait of a Man, 1815
- Edward Francis Rook, Laurel, c.1905-10
- Gurdon Trumbull, Black Bass, 1872
- John Ferguson Weir, East Rock, New Haven, 1901
- Edwin White, The Fisher Boy, 1840
- Matilda Browne, Peonies, ca. 1907
- Bessie Potter Vonnoh, Jessie Wilson, 1912–13

Works by Emil Carlsen, Charles Ebert, Bruce Crane and Willard Metcalf.

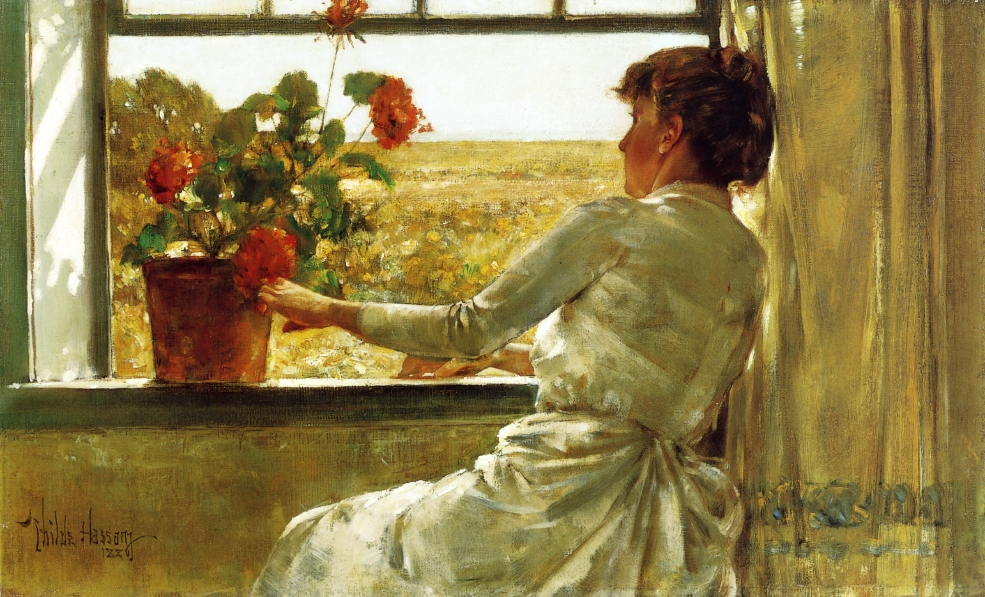
Summer Evening, oil on canvas, Childe Hassam, 1886

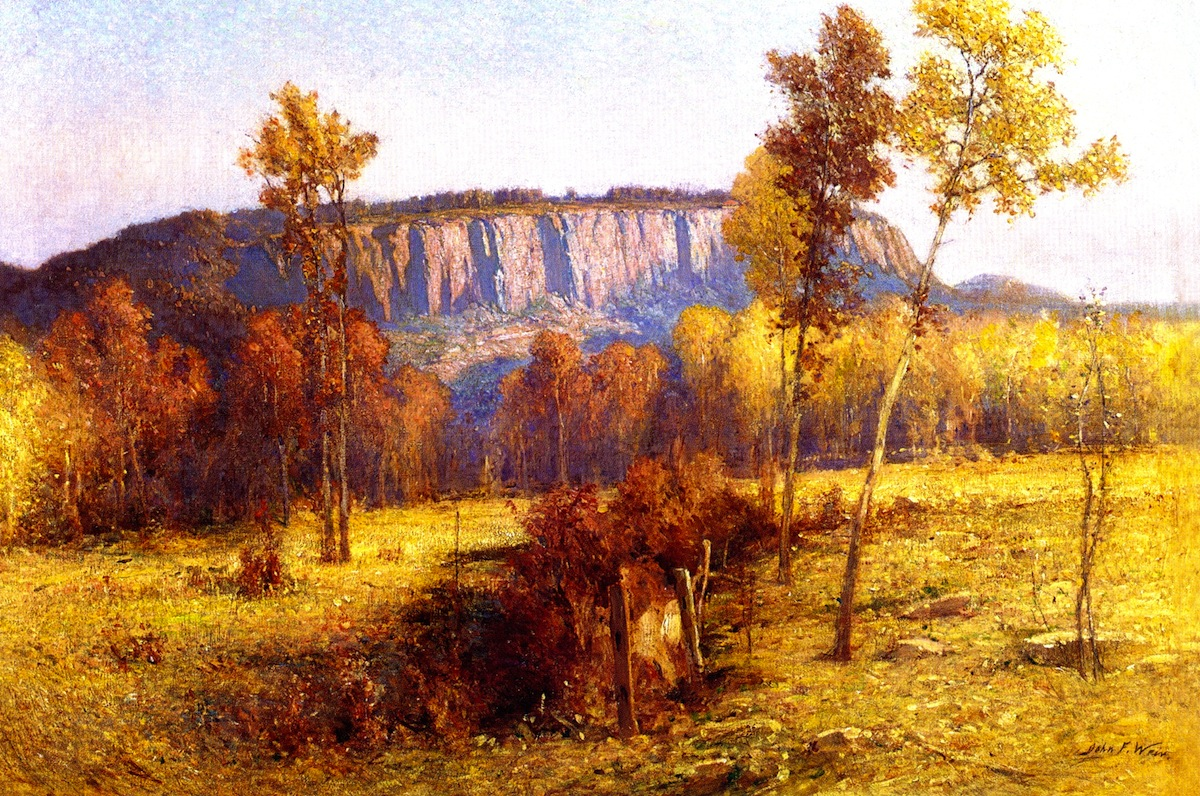
East Rock, New Haven, oil on canvas, John Ferguson Weir, 1901

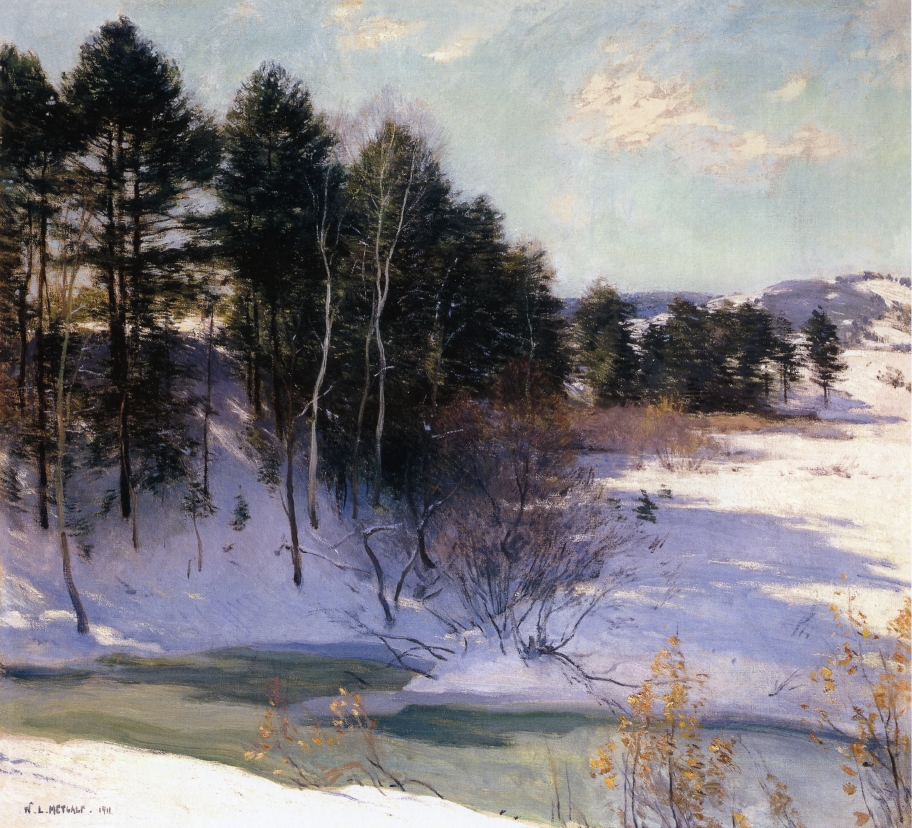
Thawing Brook, oil on canvas, Williard Metcalf, 1911

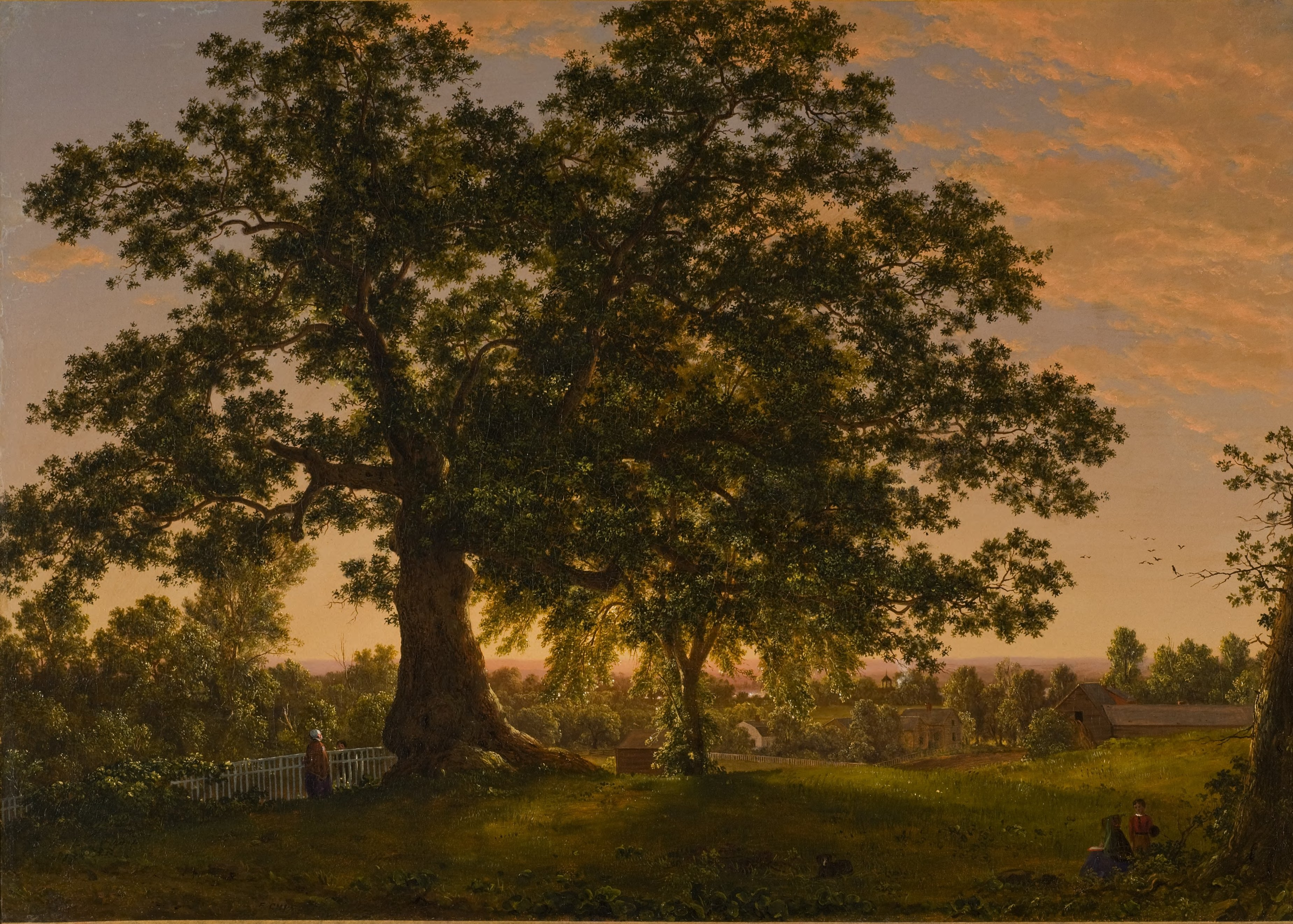
The Charter Oak at Hartford, oil on canvas, Frederic Church, 1846

== Florence Griswold House ==
The Florence Griswold House in Old Lyme, Connecticut was a boardinghouse run by Florence Griswold, where American Impressionist artists lived and painted—often directly on the walls and doors of the house. The building is now part of the campus of the Florence Griswold Museum. The house was designated a National Historic Landmarks in 1993.

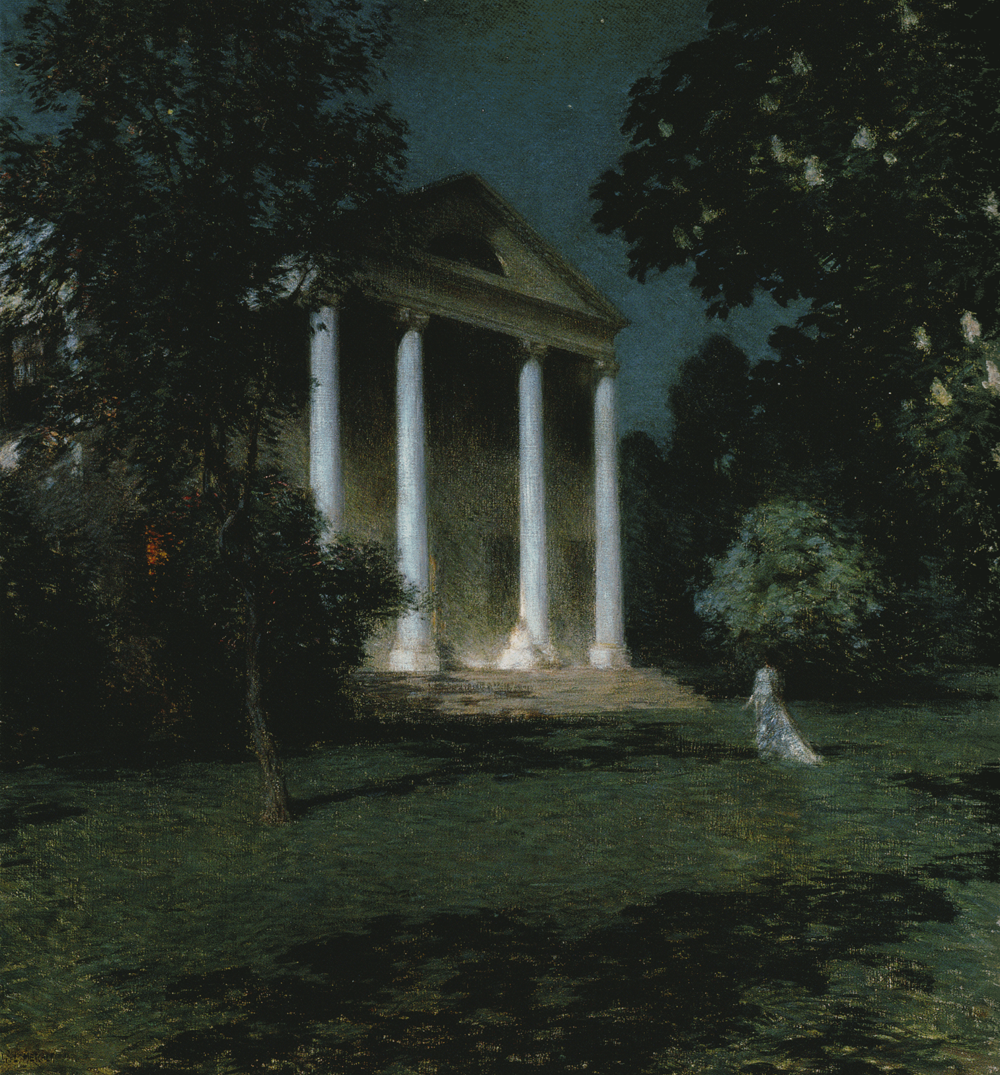
May Night (1906) by Willard Metcalf, National Gallery of Art, Washington, D.C. This depicts the Florence Griswold House.

Leading artists of the Old Lyme Art Colony who stayed at the boardinghouse were Henry Ward Ranger, Edward Charles Volkert, Childe Hassam, and Willard Metcalf. U.S. President Woodrow Wilson and his family dined with "Miss Florence" and the artists in the house.

Old Lyme resident Harry Hoffman helped to save Griswold's house through a fund-raising campaign so that it could be converted into a Museum.

=== Appearance and Layout ===
I saw a charming house that appeared like a Roman temple among the trees. Admiringly, I beheld the broad steps surmounted by four huge ionic columns that towered to the roof and formed a magnificent adornment to the mansion's front, the handsome old doorway of which stood hospitably open. — Arthur Heming, artist of the Lyme Art Colony

The entire first floor has been furnished to reflect its appearance in about 1910, the height of its years as an artists' boardinghouse. Visitors enter through a wide center hall, where an "informal gallery" displays paintings on grass cloth walls. The hall also contains Colonial and Empire furniture. Two bedrooms are off the hallway — Miss Florence's bedroom and a guest artist's bedroom.

A parlor on the first floor has artists' brushes on the mantel and the extravagant gold harp Robert Griswold brought back for his daughter from England. In that room the artist-boarders would present various types of entertainment for each other. There is a formal dining room on the first floor, and a large covered porch marks the entrance.

The second floor is exhibition space in five galleries with rotating selections from the permanent collection, as well as new acquisitions.

Samuel Belcher, architect of the Old Lyme Congregational Church, designed the late Georgian-style house for William Noyes. It was built in 1817.

The house was declared a National Historic Landmark in 1993. In July 2007 the building reopened after a 14-month restoration project.

=== The Painted Panels ===
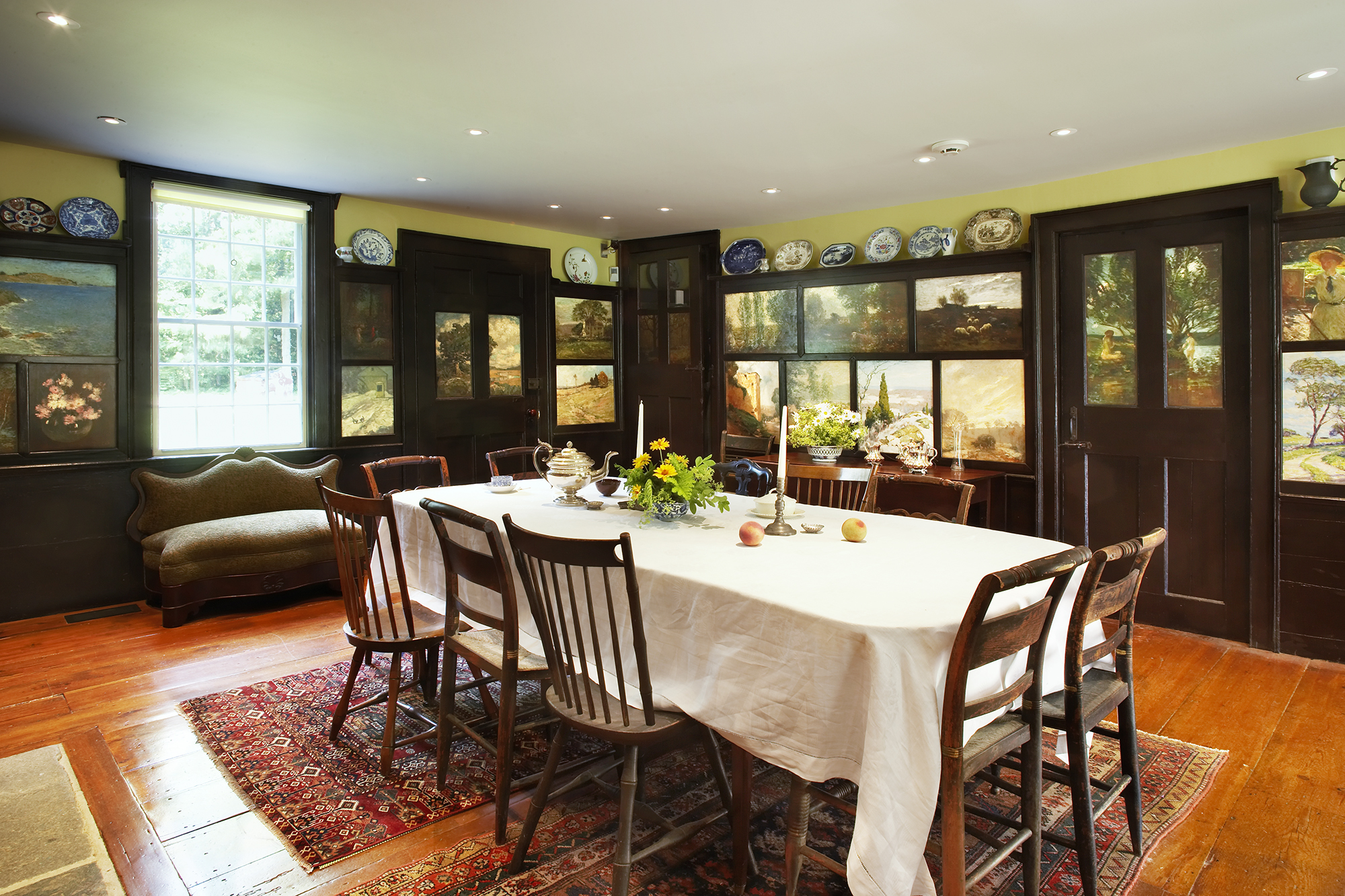
The dining room of the Florence Griswold House in Old Lyme, CT showcasing painted wall panels by 19th century American artist-boarders.

The house's dining room, where artists would gather to debate topics of the day, became a showcase for painted wall and door panels created by the artist-boarders. The artists who painted on the house's doors and walls were probably following a tradition imported from hostelries in the French art colonies at Barbizon, Giverny, and Pont-Aven, where many of them had visited and stayed on their own travels abroad. A total of 41 painted panels are in the downstairs rooms.

Artists who contributed painted panels and painted doors on the first floor of the house include Childe Hassam, Willard Metcalf, Henry Rankin Poore, Everett Warner, Allen Butler Talcott, William Chadwick, William Henry Howe, Matilda Browne, Harry Hoffman, Arthur Heming, Chauncey Foster Ryder, Clark Voorhees, Carleton Wiggins, and Bruce Crane, among others. Matilda Browne was the only female artist invited to contribute a panel and was given a place of honor: Miss Florence's own bedroom door.

=== Life at the Lyme Art Colony ===
Miss Florence's bedroom was her only private space in the house and is furnished today with memories of her life: books, art, gifts, and letters from many of the artists who became her lifelong friends. The entire rest of the first floor and the two upstairs floors of the house were taken up by her artist-boarders (and several resident cats.)

Most of the artists traveled by train from New York or Boston along the Connecticut shore to Miss Florence's. During the day, artists would paint en plein air on the grounds by the Lieutenant River, in the apple orchard, or other nearby bucolic landscapes. Often cattle and other wildlife were brought in as subjects from local farms for the artists to paint from life. In the evenings, after boisterous dinners held in the dining room or on the side porch when indoor air became too stuffy, groups retired to the parlor for music, games, and entertainment. In their invented "Wiggle Game," an artist would draw a small number of lines (or "wiggles") on a piece of paper to be completed by a fellow artist into a finished drawing.

Childe Hassam famously called a visit to Old Lyme and Miss Florence's "an excursion to Bohemia," and "just the place for high-thinking and low-living." The artists enjoyed pageants, parades, visits to nearby beaches, canoeing, swimming, and all manner of countryside pursuits on their visits from nearby cities where most resided. Some so enjoyed life in Old Lyme they later relocated permanently or purchased summer residences in the area.

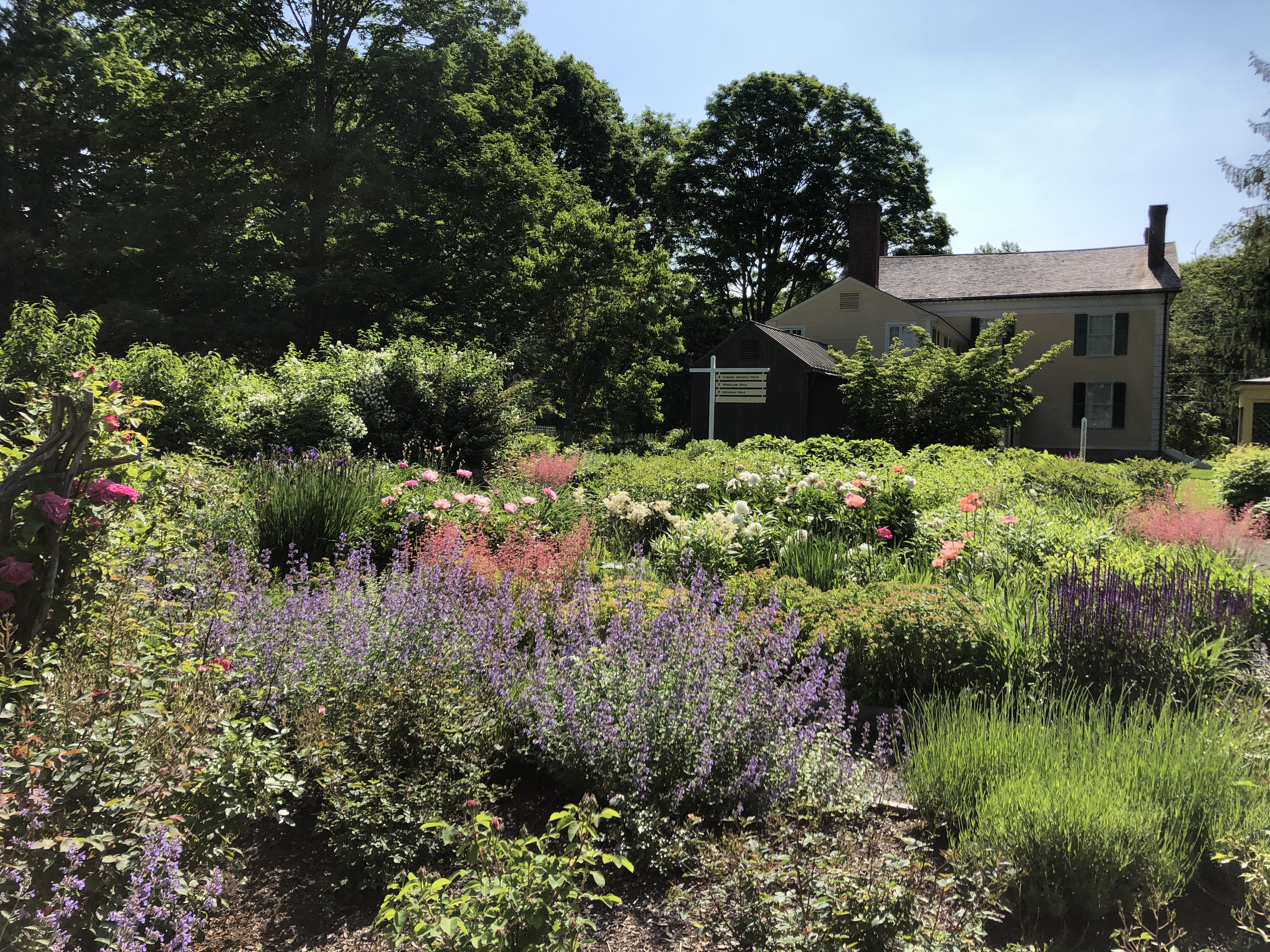
The historic Florence Griswold Museum Gardens in Old Lyme, CT in bloom, June 2020.

== Gardens and Grounds ==
=== Historic Gardens ===
The 12-acre site is home to historic gardens tended and maintained by staff and volunteers, populated with historic flowers, herbs, vegetables, and plants. Behind the house there were four distinct gardens: one for herbs and produce such as strawberries, lettuce, peas, corn, and potatoes; one for roses; and two for flowers, which Miss Florence also sold to make ends meet.

The Museum is a member of Connecticut's Historic Gardens, an organization which celebrates the diversity of gardens at distinctive historic homes throughout the state of Connecticut.

=== Robert F. Schumann Artists' Trail ===
In July 2019, the Museum opened the Robert F. Schumann Artists' Trail, a series of walking paths, landscaping features, and native plantings around the historic site. The four distinct walks (the river, hedgerow, woodland, and garden) encompass 0.5 miles in length and give modern day visitors an understanding of why artists were drawn to paint en plein air on the landscape. Markers designate sites of historic importance, such as the location of Childe Hassam's studio in the orchard. Funding from the Robert F. Schumann Foundation supported the project. Stephen Stimson Associates Landscape Architects of Cambridge, MA designed and implemented the Artists' Trail and it received an Honor Award from the American Society of Landscape Architects.

=== Chadwick Studio ===
American Impressionist William Chadwick (1879-1962) was an artist of the Lyme Art Colony and Old Lyme resident. From about 1920 until his death in 1962, the structure now on Museum Campus served as his artist's studio. This building is open to visitors the first Saturday in April through December.

== See also ==
- List of National Historic Landmarks in Connecticut
- National Register of Historic Places listings in New London County, Connecticut
