= Roger Wilson Dennis =

American artist (1902–1996)

Roger Wilson Dennis (1902–1996) was an American artist whose art was informed by the American Impressionism practiced by the Lyme Art Colony and the art of the French Impressionists. A prolific painter, he concentrated mainly on natural scenes. Dennis was born in Norwich, Connecticut. He was head of the Conservation Department at the Lyman Allyn Art Museum at Connecticut College. His work is held in the collection of the Florence Griswold Museum.
