= Gladys Kelley Fitch =

American painter

Gladys Kelley Fitch (Fitsch)
- Born: August 29, 1896; Patchogue, New York, United States
- Died: January 17, 1986 (aged 89); Waterbury, Connecticut, U.S.
- Known for: Painting, art teacher

Gladys L. Kelley Fitch (Fitsch) (August 29, 1896 – January 17, 1986) was an American painter and art teacher. She lived in Lyme, Connecticut and was a member of the Old Lyme art colony.

== Early life and education ==
Gladys Kelley was born in Patchogue, New York and lived in Rockville Centre and Hempstead, the daughter of William Bennett Kelley and Julia Eisele Kelley. Her father was a doctor; her brother Chester Leon Kelley was a novelist and advertising executive. She won several award at the New York School of Applied Design for Women, and her paintings were considered "the most striking work" in the school's exhibition in May 1919. While she was a student she also won a cover design contest in The Touchstone magazine; her cover was published in May 1919. Her brother married one of her art school classmates, Madelon Brasher.

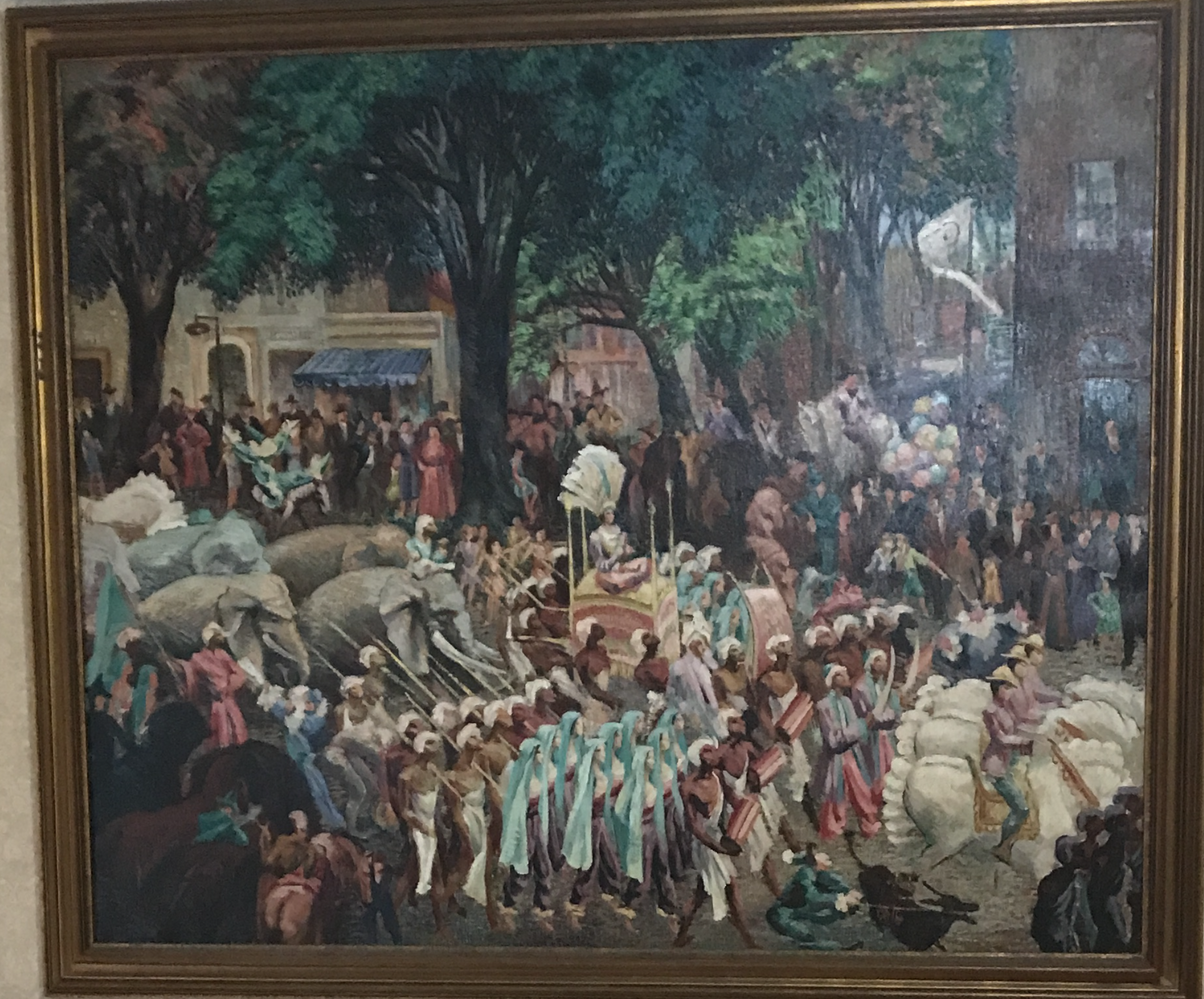
Painting is about 5' x 4'

== Career ==
Fitsch was head of the art department at the Kimberley School in Montclair, New Jersey, and taught at the New York School of Applied Design for Women. She was a member of the New Jersey Art Association, the Connecticut Watercolor Society, and the Lyme Art Association. She was a life member of the Art Students League of New York. In 1940, she exhibited her landscapes in watercolors, pastels and oils at the Morton Galleries in New York City, and one of her watercolor paintings was purchased by the Federal Works Agency for a Marine hospital in Carville, Louisiana.

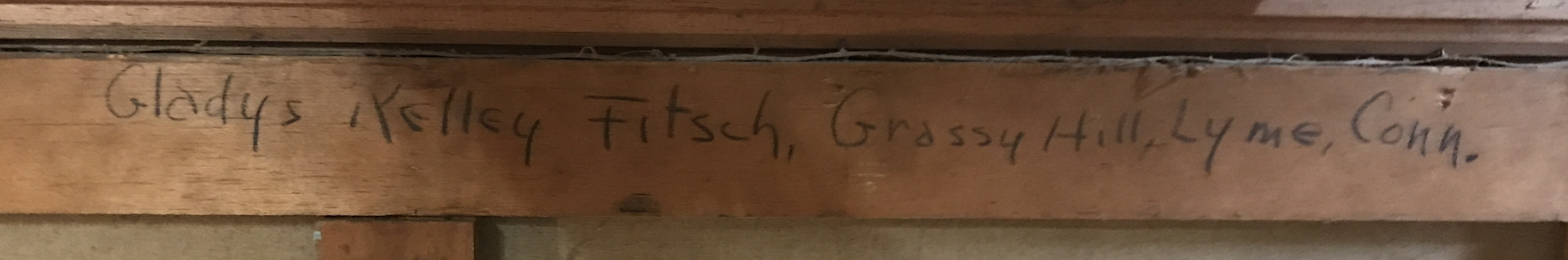
Back of parade painting

== Personal life ==
In 1923, Gladys Kelley married fellow artist Eugene Camille Fitsch, who was born in Alsace and immigrated to the United States in 1913. The Fitsches divorced in 1936. She signed her paintings "Gladys Kelley Fitsch". She died in 1986, at the age of 89, in Waterbury, Connecticut.

== Works in notable collections ==
- "Flower arrangement" - c. 1940, watercolor, crayon, and pencil on paper, Smithsonian American Art Museum

== Publications ==
- Fitch, Gladys Kelley. Creative art expression and appreciation : a method of developing student ability ... a way to bridge the interval between student and professional approach (1937)
