= Wilson Irvine =

American painter

Wilson Henry Irvine (28 February 1869 – 1936) was an American Impressionist landscape painter.

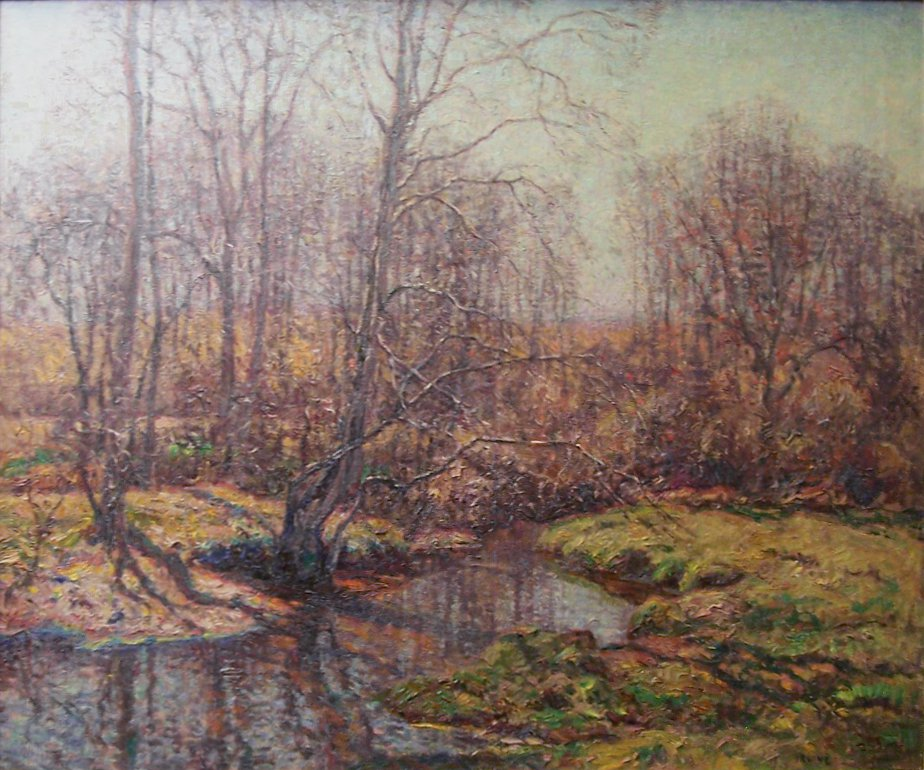
"Fall, Eight Mile River" near Old Lyme, Connecticut

Although most closely associated with the Old Lyme, Connecticut art colony headed by Florence Griswold, Irvine spent his early career near Chicago, a product of the School of the Art Institute of Chicago. Irvine also painted across Western Europe, where he produced impressionist versions of the local countryside.

== Early career ==
Wilson Henry Irvine, born near Byron, Illinois, was a descendant of early Illinois settlers and farmers. He graduated from Rockford Central High School. He worked at the Chicago Portrait Company. He studied at The Art Institute of Chicago.

From the beginning, Irvine's interest in painterly subjects was equalled by a parallel focus on artistic technology. While still in his 20s, Irvine was a pioneer of the airbrush as artistic medium — a medium which had just been developed and marketed by Liberty Walkup, Irvine's Illinois neighbor, mentor, and teacher.

Having mastered the airbrush, in 1888, Irvine moved to Chicago. Irvine's "day job" during this period was as an illustrator/graphic designer, often employing the still-novel airbrush. Simultaneously, Irvine built a career as a serious painter. He led the Palette and Chisel Club and Cliff Dwellers Club, along with sculptor Lorado Taft.

Irvine attended the night school of the Art Institute of Chicago, where he studied for over seven years. By the turn of the century, the Institute often showed Irvine's work, and gave him a solo show over the 1916-1917 Christmas season. The Art Institute maintains a number of Wilson Irvine paintings in its permanent collection.

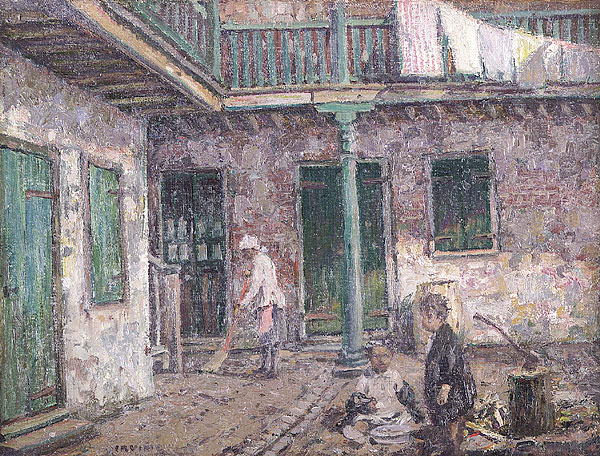
"French Quarter Courtyard", c. 1927-1928

== Old Lyme, Connecticut years ==
While developing his career in Chicago, Irvine frequently headed east, painting in Massachusetts, Connecticut, and elsewhere in New England — as early as 1906, he exhibited New England scenes at the Art Institute. He also took working vacations elsewhere in the Eastern U.S., including to Virginia and New Orleans.

But it was not until he was 45 (in 1914) that Irvine packed up and moved his family to Old Lyme, Connecticut, becoming part of the Florence Griswold circle, now recognized as the "American Barbizon," hub of American Impressionism. It is as an Old Lyme painter that Irvine is best remembered today. (After relocating East, Irvine maintained his contacts with Chicago, where the market for his work remained strong.) He corresponded with Sidney C. Woodward.

Following through on his early experiments with the airbrush, in his later years Irvine continued to try out new artistic techniques. His later work includes "aqua prints" and "prismatic painting." His Prismatic Winter Landscape appeared on the cover of the 31 January 1931 issue of The Literary Digest. In 1926 he was elected into the National Academy of Design as an Associate Academician.

Late in his career, Irvine's work was the subject of solo exhibitions, including at:

- Chicago's Carson Pirie Scott (1922)
- Connecticut's Wadsworth Atheneum (1925)
- New York's Grand Central Art Galleries (1930)

== European painting ==
Irvine's career was highlighted by three extended sojourns to Europe:

- 1908: England and France,
- 1923: British Isles,
- 1928-29: countrysides around Martigues, France and Ronda, Spain.

== Death and reputation ==
Irvine died of a cerebral hemorrhage on 21 August 1936. In recent years, Irvine has been rediscovered and acknowledged as a key figure in early-20th-century American Impressionism. Irvine's paintings are included in the collections of Chicago's Art Institute, Florence Griswold Museum; National Portrait Gallery, Corcoran Gallery of Art; and Union League Club.

Irvine is best known for his mastery of light and texture — a 1998 exhibit of his work was called Wilson Henry Irvine and the Poetry of Light. To capture subtle effects of light, Irvine often painted en plein air — wearing his trademark cap, knickers, and goatee, with his easel and his paints set up in the field.
