= William Chadwick (painter) =

American painter

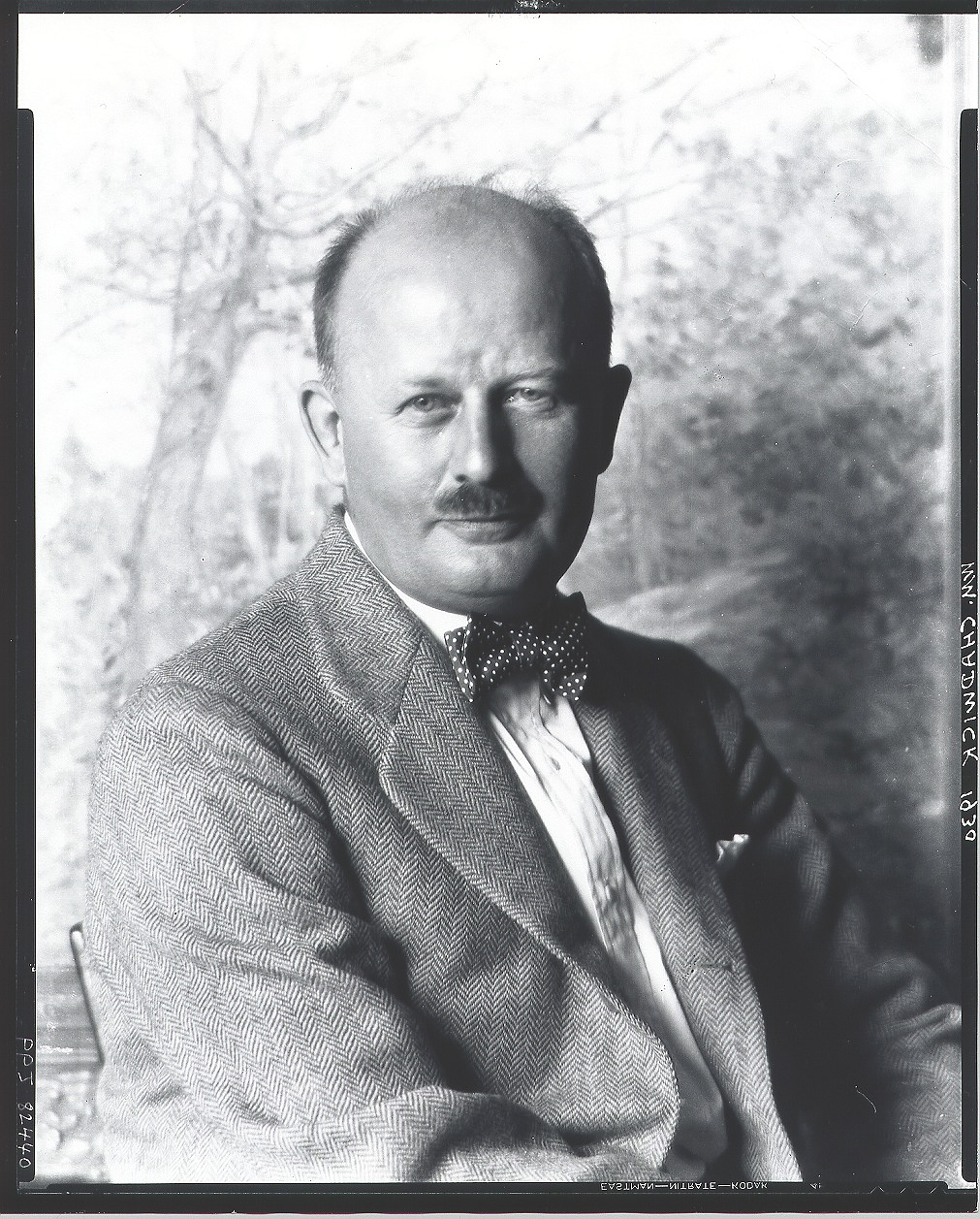
- Portrait of William Chadwick, 1930, by Peter A. Juley
- Born: William Chadwick; 1879; Dewsbury, Yorkshire, United Kingdom
- Died: August 3, 1962 (aged 82–83); Old Lyme, Connecticut
- Known for: Painter
- Movement: American Impressionism, Tonalism

William Chadwick (1879–August 3, 1962) was an American Impressionist painter known for his landscape paintings. In 1884 his family emigrated from England to Holyoke, Massachusetts as his father, Day Chadwick, relocated his woolen goods business to avoid tariffs, opening the Chadwick Plush Company with his uncle John, and 70 imported workers, later renaming the business the Holyoke Plush Company. It was in Holyoke where the young Chadwick would complete his schooling and developed an interest in art. Subsequently, studying under Joseph DeCamp and John Henry Twachtman at the Art Students League of New York, he became a member of the Old Lyme art colony. Although his artwork was not a contemporary commercial success, following his death it found renewed interest nationally in retrospective gallery installations. Today his works may be found in the Mattatuck Museum in Waterbury, Connecticut, as well as the George Walter Vincent Smith Art Museum in Springfield, Massachusetts, and the Smithsonian American Art Museum in Washington, D.C. In addition to their collection holdings, Chadwick's studio remains extant at the Florence Griswold Museum in Old Lyme, Connecticut, open to visitors from April to October.

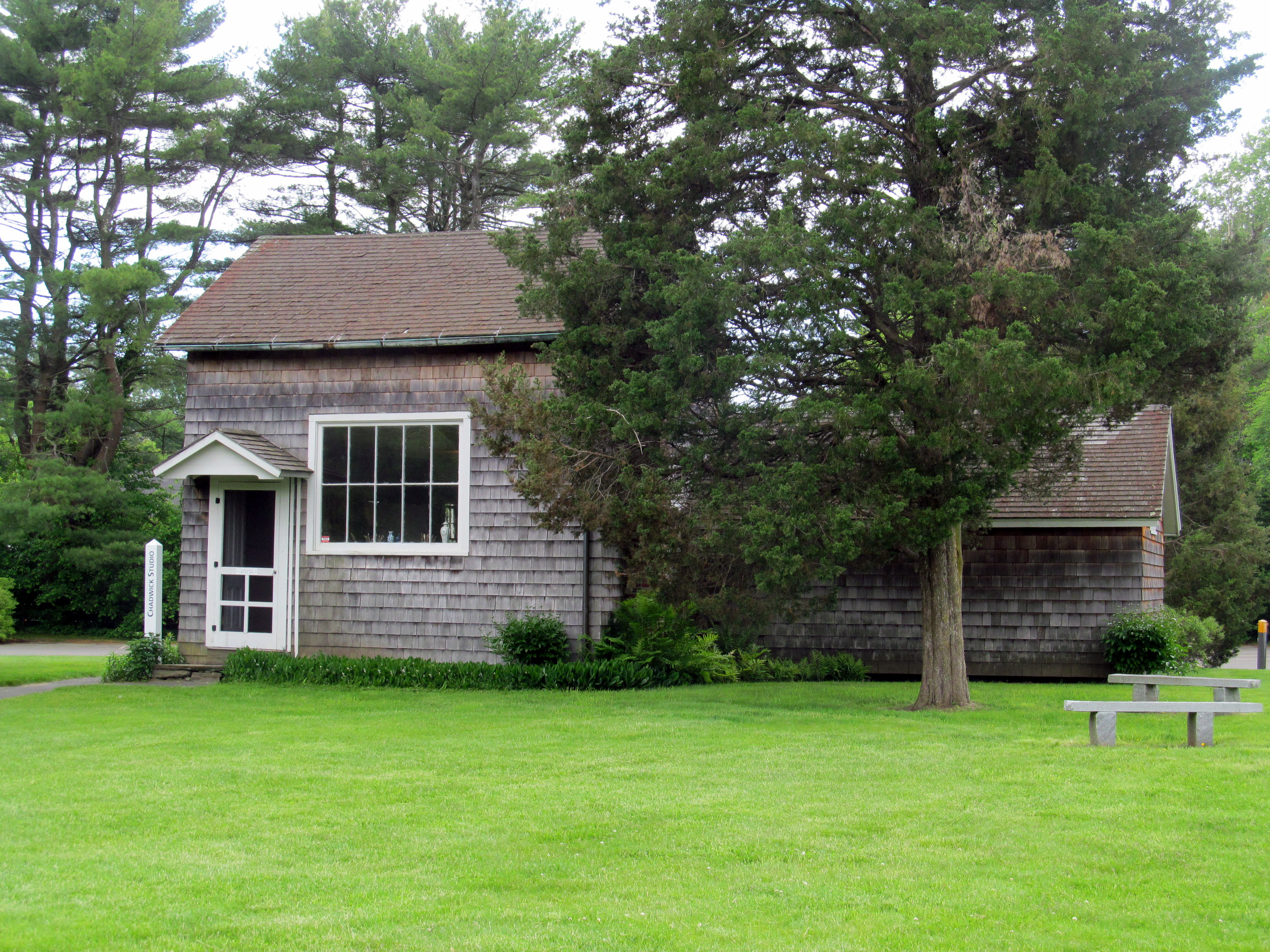
Chadwick's studio, now on the grounds of the Florence Griswold Museum
