= William Henry Howe =

American artist

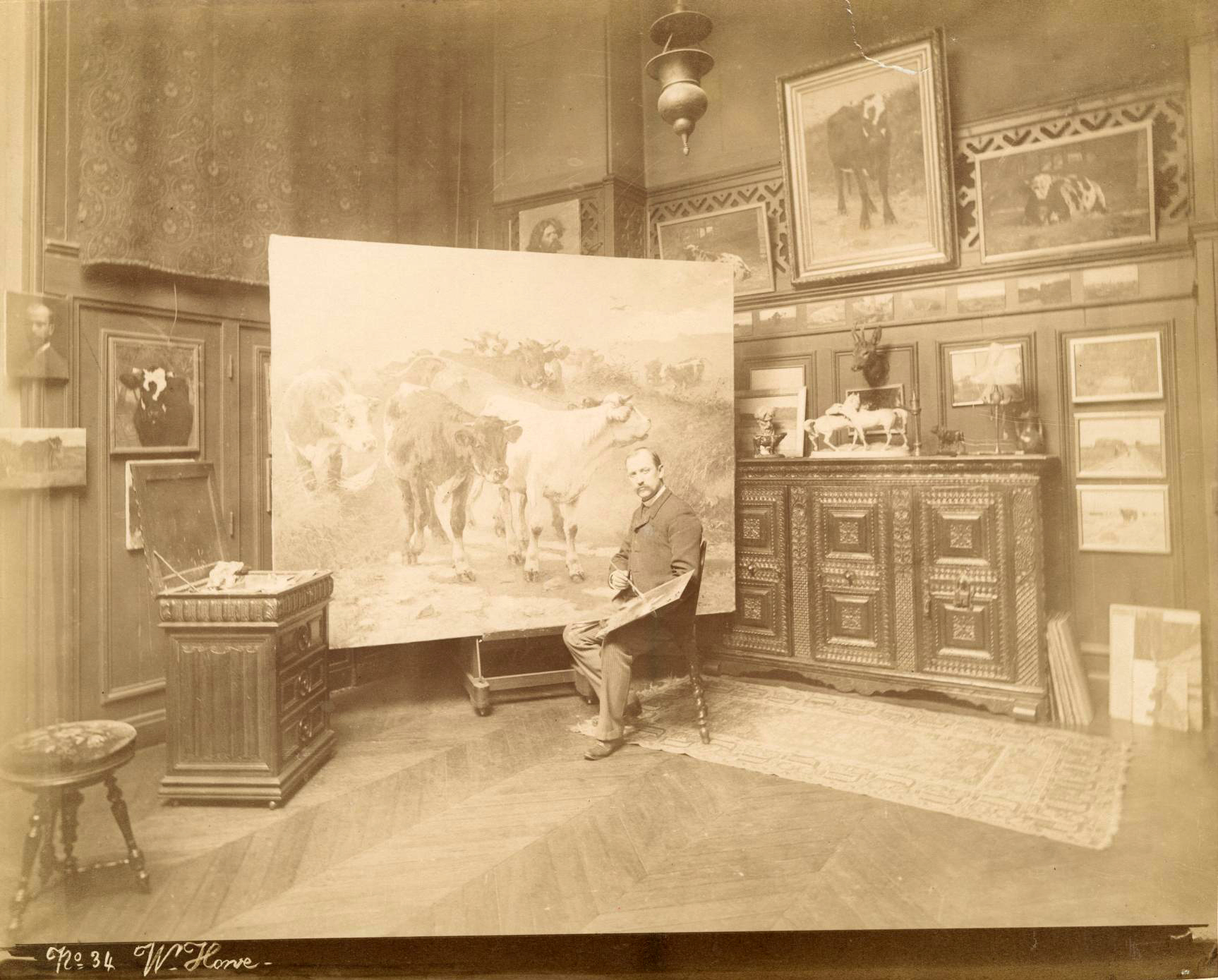
William Henry Howe in his Paris studio.

William Henry Howe (22 November 1846 in Ravenna, Ohio – 16 March 1929 in Bronxville, New York) was an American painter active in Bronxville.

Howe was a student of Otto de Thoren and Vuillefroy. He first worked in Paris, where he painted scenes from the rustic life in Normandy.

Howe received many awards, notably a third-class medal at the Paris Salon of 1888; the Temple Gold Medal from the Pennsylvania Academy of the Fine Arts in 1890; a medal at the World's Columbian Exposition in Chicago in 1893; bronze medal at the Cotton States and International Exposition in Atlanta in 1895; and a silver medal at the Pan-American Exposition in Buffalo in 1901.

He was elected a member of the National Academy in 1897 and made a Chevalier of the Legion of Honor in 1899. According to Howe's Biographer, “His paintings were honest transcripts from nature, faithfully cooked up from many studies and sketches from objective observations, however he knew his cattle so well that France decorated him with the [Cross of the] Legion of Honor.”

Howe was part of the Old Lyme Art Colony centered at Florence Griswold's boardinghouse in Old Lyme, Connecticut. Howe there played the role of the benign "Uncle," as the younger artists called him.

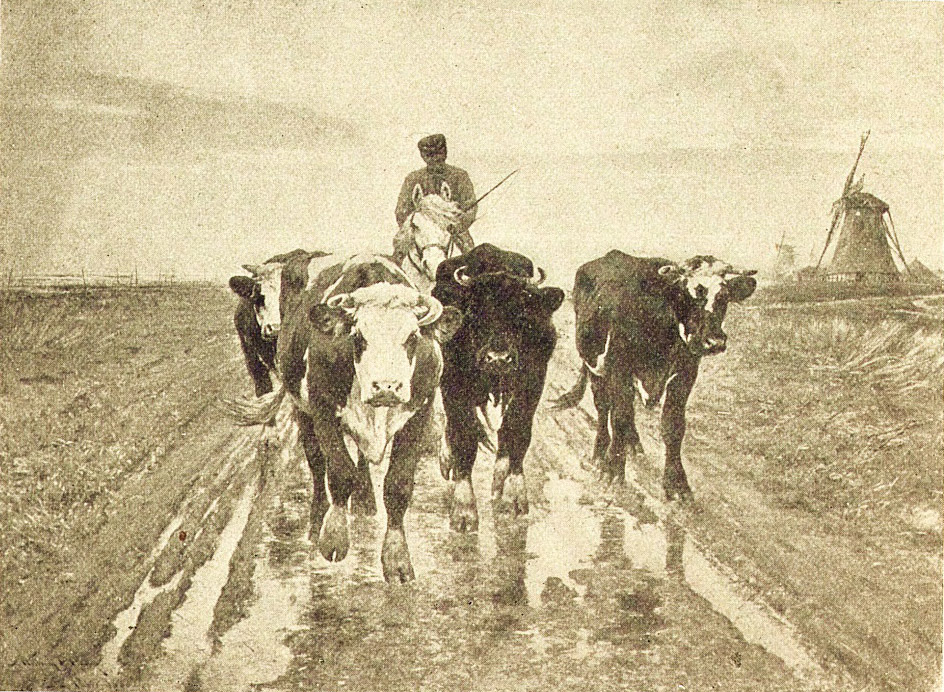
Early Start to Market, 1888, whereabouts unknown (stolen 1922 and never recovered)

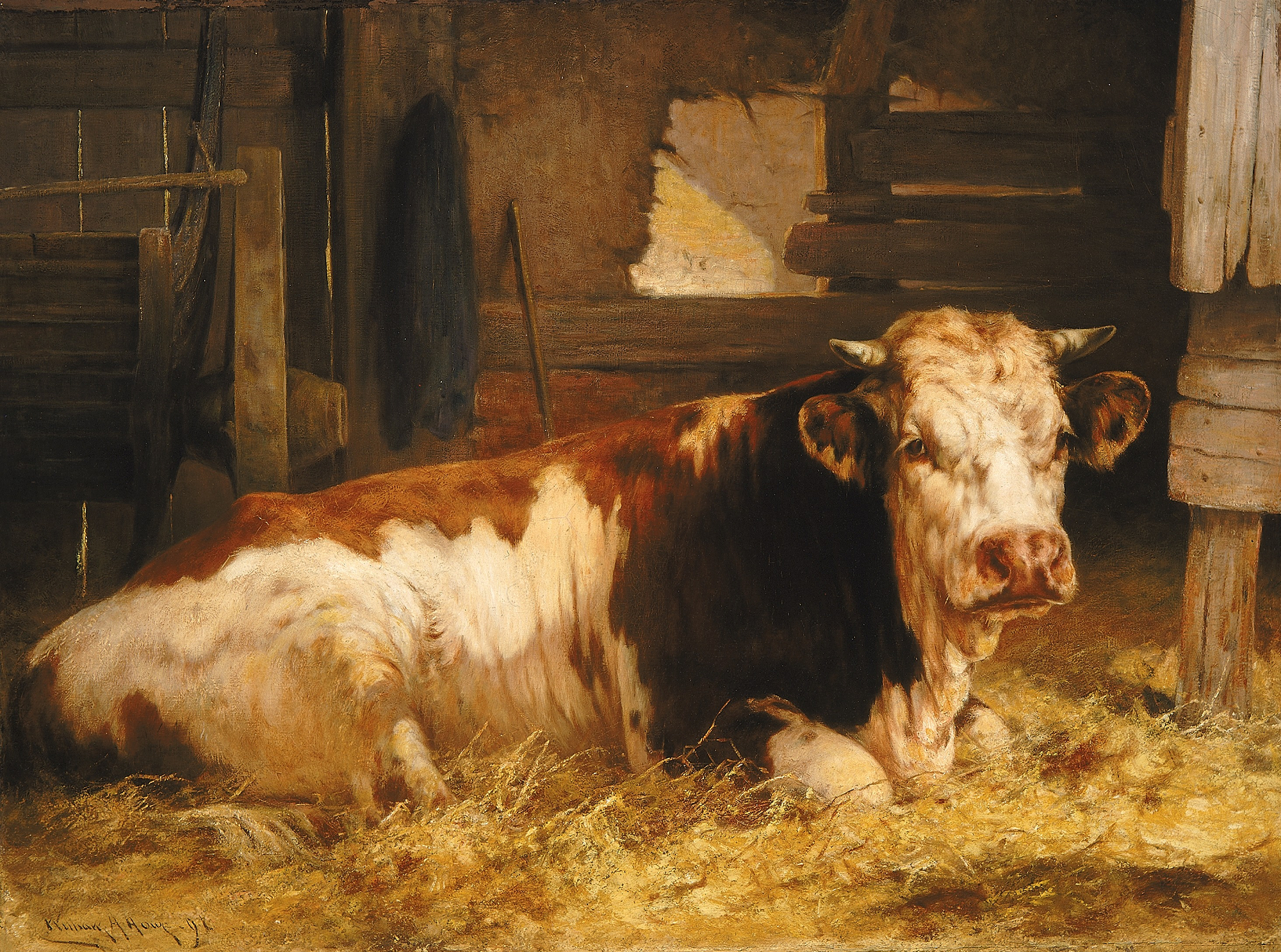
Monarch of the Farm, c.1901, Smithsonian American Art Museum

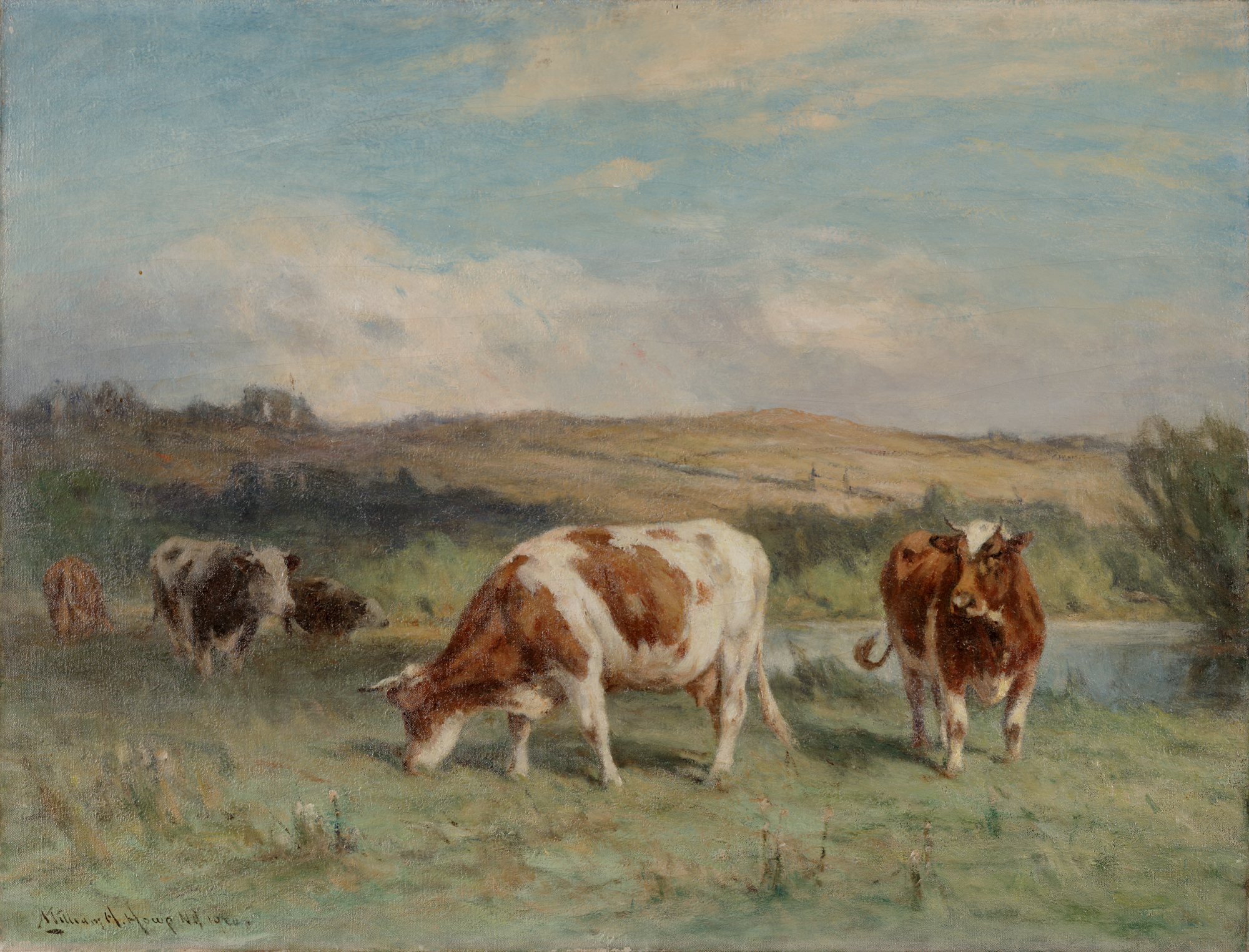
Lyme Pastures, 1920, Dallas Museum of Art

== See also ==
- List of American painters exhibited at the 1893 World's Columbian Exposition
