= Florence Griswold =

American artist

Florence Ann Griswold (December 25, 1850 – December 6, 1937) was a resident of Old Lyme, Connecticut, United States who became the nucleus of the "Old Lyme Art Colony" in the early 20th century. Her home has since been made into the Florence Griswold Museum, a National Historic Landmark.

== Life and work ==
Florence Griswold was the youngest daughter of Helen Powers Griswold and ship captain Robert Harper Griswold. As one of Old Lyme’s oldest and richest families, the Griswolds enjoyed a privileged life until economic difficulties changed the family’s fortunes. Helen decided to convert the family home to a finishing school for young ladies and opened the Griswold Home School for Girls in 1878 where Florence, along with her mother and two sisters, taught. Throughout her life, Florence would continue to confront financial difficulties, and by the late 1890s, she found herself alone on the family homestead. She transformed the school into a boarding house and began to rent rooms for $7 per week.

In 1899, artist Henry Ward Ranger, recently returned from Europe and inspired by the example of the French Barbizon artists, rented a room from Griswold (who is still affectionately referred to as 'Miss Florence' in Old Lyme) and encouraged his acquaintances to do likewise. Over 135 American artists boarded in the Florence Griswold House from 1899 through the 1930s and were invited to paint a panel on the walls or doors of the house. Over 43 panels now adorn the house, with a concentration in the Dining Room.

Childe Hassam arrived in 1903 and he, in turn, invited Willard Metcalf, who arrived in 1905. Among the women artists who stayed and painted at Miss Florence's were Matilda Browne and sisters Lydia and Breta Longacre. Many other American Impressionist painters summered at the colony, in Griswold's house, among them Wilson Irvine, who arrived in 1914. Also, Edward Charles Volkert who became known as "America's cattle painter", and William Henry Howe, another cattle painter, who was there was referred to as "Uncle" because of his age. Ellen Axson Wilson, first wife of president Woodrow Wilson, came as an art student and became friends with Griswold; in 1914 Griswold attended the wedding of Presidential daughter Jessie Woodrow Wilson Sayre. Many American impressionist paintings of the era are of subjects in and around the Griswold house.

Looking back on this era of artistic prosperity, Griswold commented in 1937, "So you see, first the artists adopted Lyme, and then Lyme adopted the artists, and now, today, Lyme and art are synonymous."

A portion of Griswold's land was purchased by the Lyme Art Association in 1917 so that a gallery could be built. She became its first manager when it opened in 1921.

== Florence Griswold Museum ==
Old Lyme resident Harry Hoffman helped to save Griswold's house through a fund-raising campaign so that it could be converted into a museum. First called the Florence Griswold House, it is now known as the Florence Griswold Museum. Located at 96 Lyme Street in Old Lyme, the house was declared a National Historic Landmark in 1993. In July 2007 the building reopened after a 14-month restoration project.

The museum exhibits both American art and historical material. Its collection spans fine art, sculpture, works on paper, artist's studio material, toys and dolls, ceramics, furniture, textiles, decorative arts and historic artifacts, and the Lyme Historical Society archives.
