= Arthur Heming =

Canadian painter and novelist

Arthur Henry Howard Heming
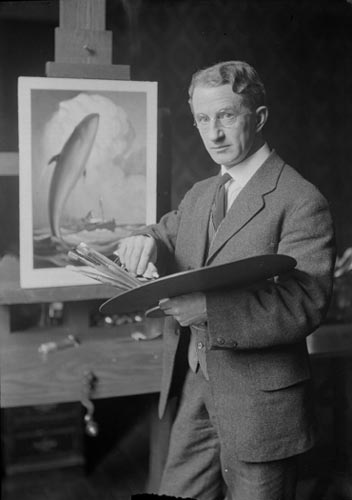
- Arthur Heming, 1912
- Born: January 17, 1870; Paris, Ontario
- Died: October 30, 1940 (aged 70); Hamilton, Ontario

Arthur Henry Howard Heming (January 17, 1870 – October 30, 1940) was a Canadian painter and novelist known as the "chronicler of the North" for his paintings, sketches, essays and books about Canada's North.

== Career as an artist ==
Born in Paris, Ontario and raised in Hamilton, he studied at the Hamilton Art School, then in New York City at the Art Students League with Frank DuMond, and the Old Lyme Art Colony, and in London with the Welsh master Frank Brangwyn.

Heming painted paintings depicting the fur trade, many for the book The Drama of the Forests. He asked the Hudson's Bay Company to include his work in their collection as a contributor to the history of Canadian wilderness exploration. Instead, in 1921, the Royal Ontario Museum purchased a selection of these paintings. Maclean's Magazine then reproduced them for their covers throughout the early 1920's.

A 124-page exhibition catalogue was produced by Museum London in 2013, with five essays, Arthur Heming: Chronicler of the North. It followed a 2012 gallery retrospective of his work, shown at Museum London.

Heming was an associate member of the Royal Canadian Academy of Arts.

== Difficulties as an artist ==
Heming was diagnosed as colour blind and as a result worked mostly in black and white for almost all of his life, with the addition of yellow. However, near the end of his career, he started to paint using the full range of colours, having been told by a fellow artist he was no longer colour blind.

== Novels ==
His novels were only three in number, but they enjoyed success in serial form and then in book editions from major publishers. His novels were not armchair concoctions, as Heming had travelled extensively in the wilderness.

"Among his northern journeys; he accompanied noted gentleman adventurer Caspar Whitney to the Barrengrounds, patrolled with the Royal North West Mounted Police in the mountains, and altogether travelled 550 miles by raft, 1000 miles by dog team, 1700 miles by snowshoe and 3300 miles by canoe."

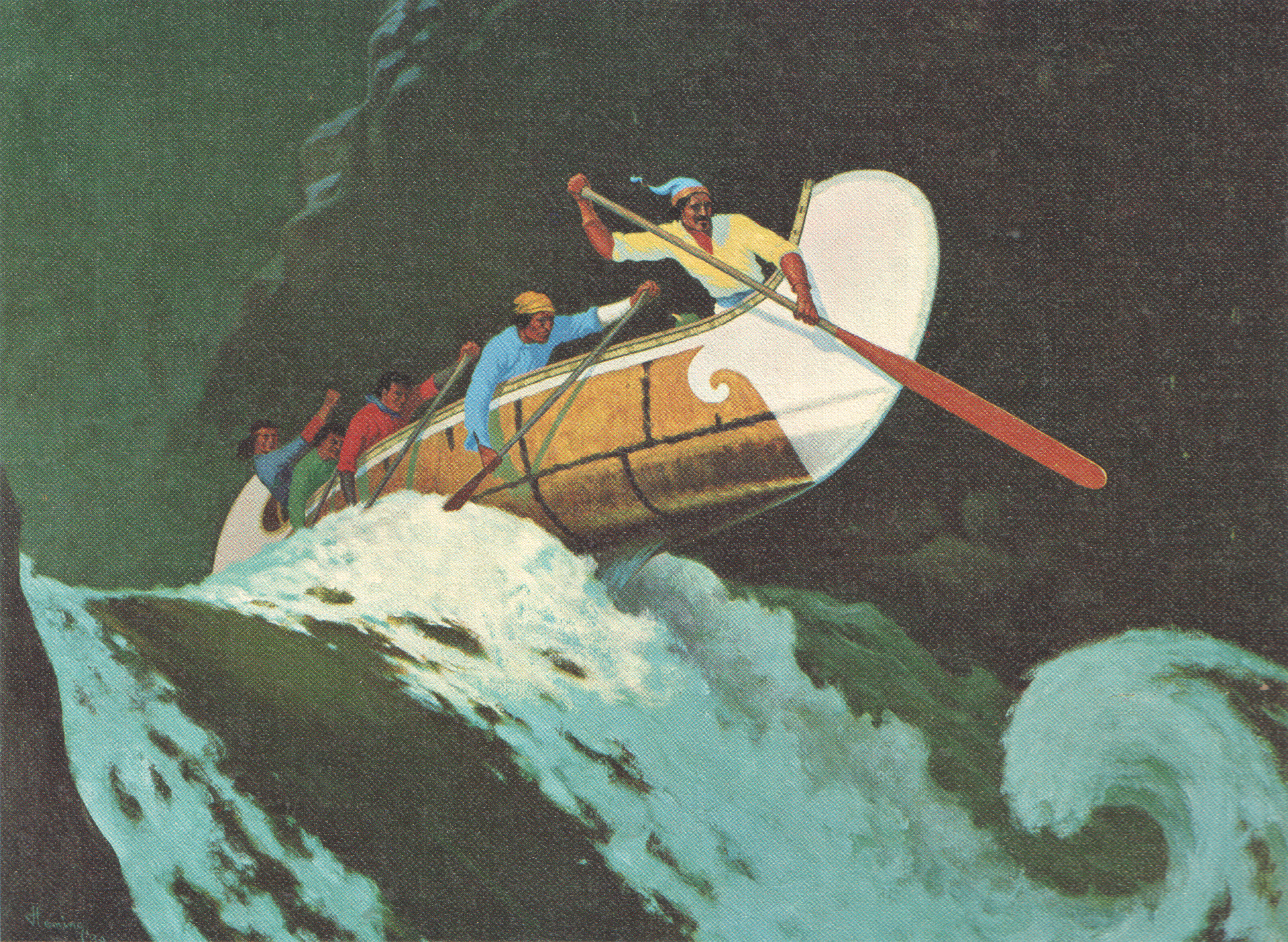
"Canadian Express"

== Bibliography ==
- Across the Sub-Arctics of Canada (1898) (James Williams Tyrrell, illustrated by Heming who was on the expedition).
- Mooswa & Others of the Boundaries (1900) By William Alexander Fraser. Illustrated by Heming. New York: Scribner's, 1900.
- The Drama of the Forests: romance and adventure (1921, novel).
- Spirit Lake (1923, novel).
- The Heming Paintings of Northern Life (1923, limited edition artbook).
- The Living Forest (1925, novel).

Heming also illustrated books by other authors, especially those of the author William Alexander Fraser (1859-1933, not to be confused with the Canadian politician of the same name).

Biographical works include: Miss Florence and the Artists of Old Lyme (1971, local history); and Arthur Heming: Chronicler of the North (2013, Museum London exhibition catalogue).

== Family history ==
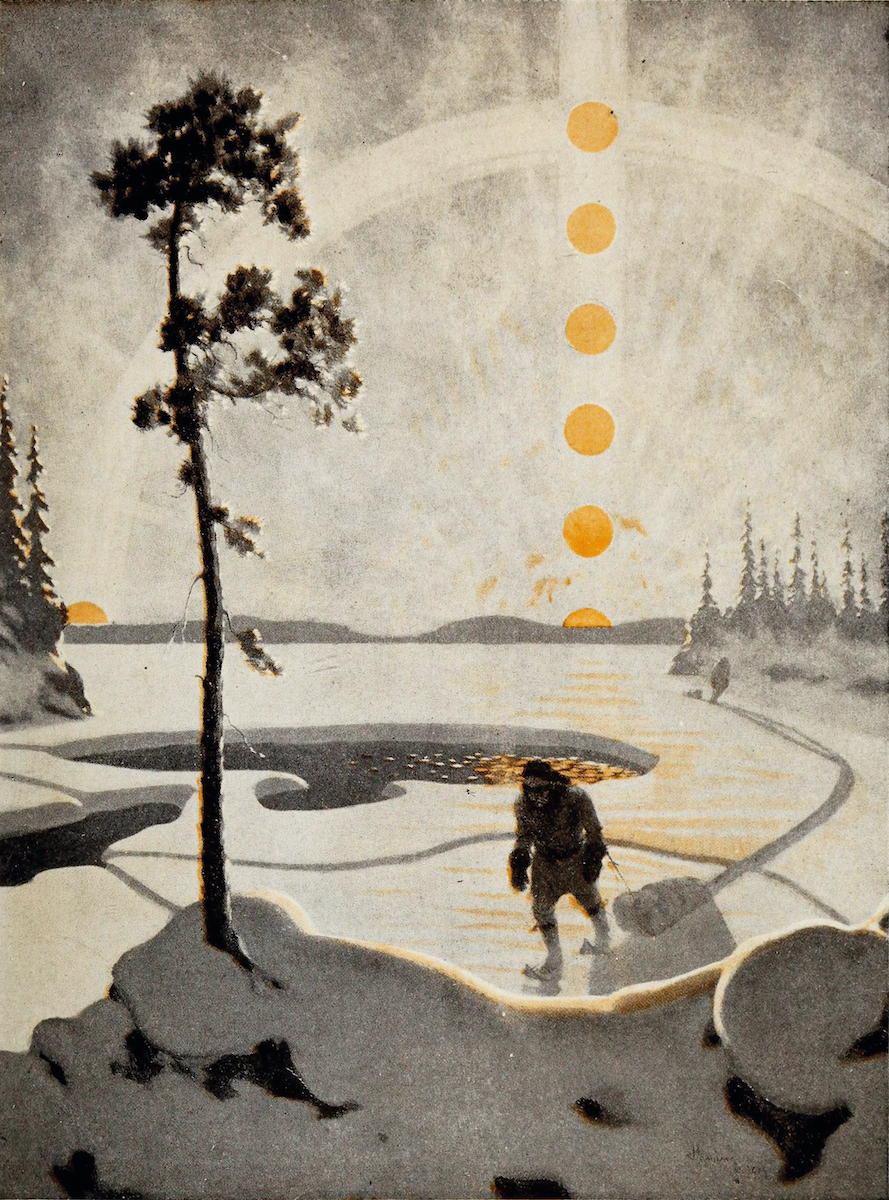
Postmen of the Wilderness, 1921

The Hemings emigrated from Bognor (Regis) England in the top half of the 19th century. Edward Francis Heming left Bognor and settled just outside Guelph, Ontario. on the Eramosa Line in 1832. He called the farm 'Bognor Lodge' and it is still there today in Heming ownership. The northern half of the farm was expropriated and flooded to make Guelph Lake.

The Heming family traces its ancestors back to King Harold Heming of Denmark, the last Viking king of Denmark, and the one who brought Christianity to Denmark. They eventually travelled through France and settled there having the town named 'Heming' after them. When France became Roman Catholic, they were/are Protestants, they emigrated again just across the English Channel to the seaside spa of Bognor.

Edward Heming had five sons in Canada West. One of them was Charles Heming and he became the postmaster of the small village of Sydenham. Because there was another growing town near Ottawa with the same name, Charles was asked to change the name of Sydenham. He changed it to 'Bognor' and it is there today - a tribute to the pioneering Canadian Heming family.
