= Willard Metcalf =

American painter

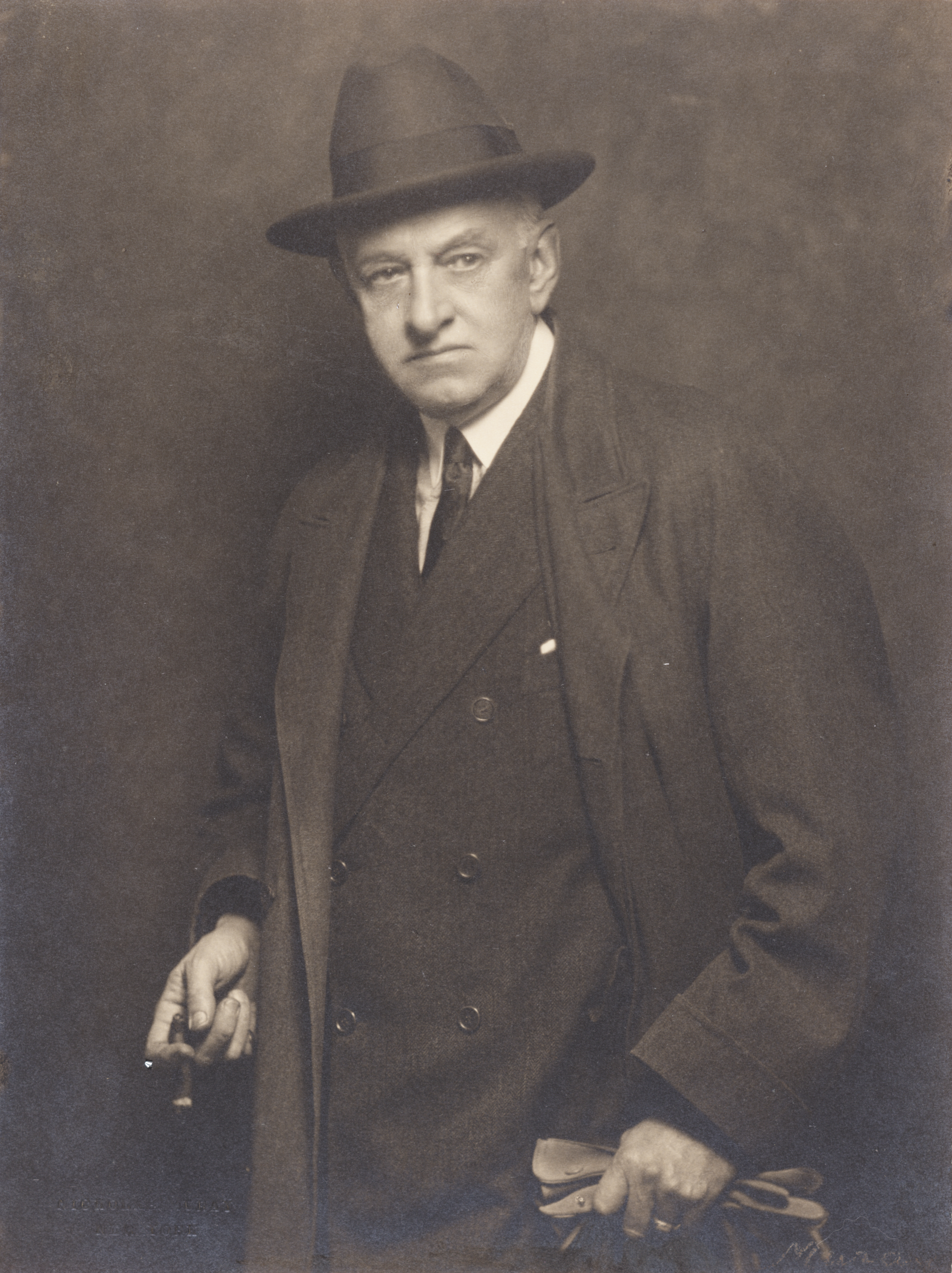
- Metcalf, c. 1920
- Born: July 1, 1858; Lowell, Massachusetts
- Died: March 9, 1925 (aged 66); New York City
- Education: School of the Museum of Fine Arts, Boston, Académie Julian, Paris
- Known for: Painting
- Movement: Impressionism Landscape art
- Awards: American Academy of Arts and Letters Inductee

Willard Leroy Metcalf (July 1, 1858 – March 9, 1925) was an American painter born in Lowell, Massachusetts. He studied at the School of the Museum of Fine Arts, Boston, and later attended Académie Julian, Paris. After early figure-painting and illustration, he became prominent as a landscape painter. He was one of the Ten American Painters who in 1897 seceded from the Society of American Artists. For some years he was an instructor in the Women's Art School, Cooper Union, New York, and in the Art Students League, New York. In 1893 he became a member of the American Watercolor Society, New York. Generally associated with American Impressionism, he is also remembered for his New England landscapes and involvement with the Old Lyme Art Colony at Old Lyme, Connecticut and his influential years at the Cornish Art Colony.

== Early years ==
Born into a working-class family, Metcalf began painting in 1874. In 1876 he opened a studio in Boston, and received a scholarship at the Boston Museum school, where he studied until 1878. In 1882 he held an exhibition at the J. Eastman Chase Gallery in Boston, the sales from which financed a study trip abroad.

Metcalf left for Europe in September 1883, and did not return to the United States until late 1888. During that time he traveled and painted, studying first in Paris with Gustave Boulanger and Jules-Joseph Lefebvre, subsequently going to England and Pont-Aven, Brittany. In the winter of 1884 he apparently met John Twachtman in Paris, and painted at Grez-sur-Loing alongside other American artists, including Theodore Robinson. His landscapes at this time were traditional renditions of peasant scenes, in the manner of Jean Millet. By 1886 Metcalf was painting in Giverny, evidently the first American painter to visit there. Soon thereafter he traveled to Algeria and Tunisia, returning to Giverny in the summers of 1887 and 1888, in the company of other American painters.

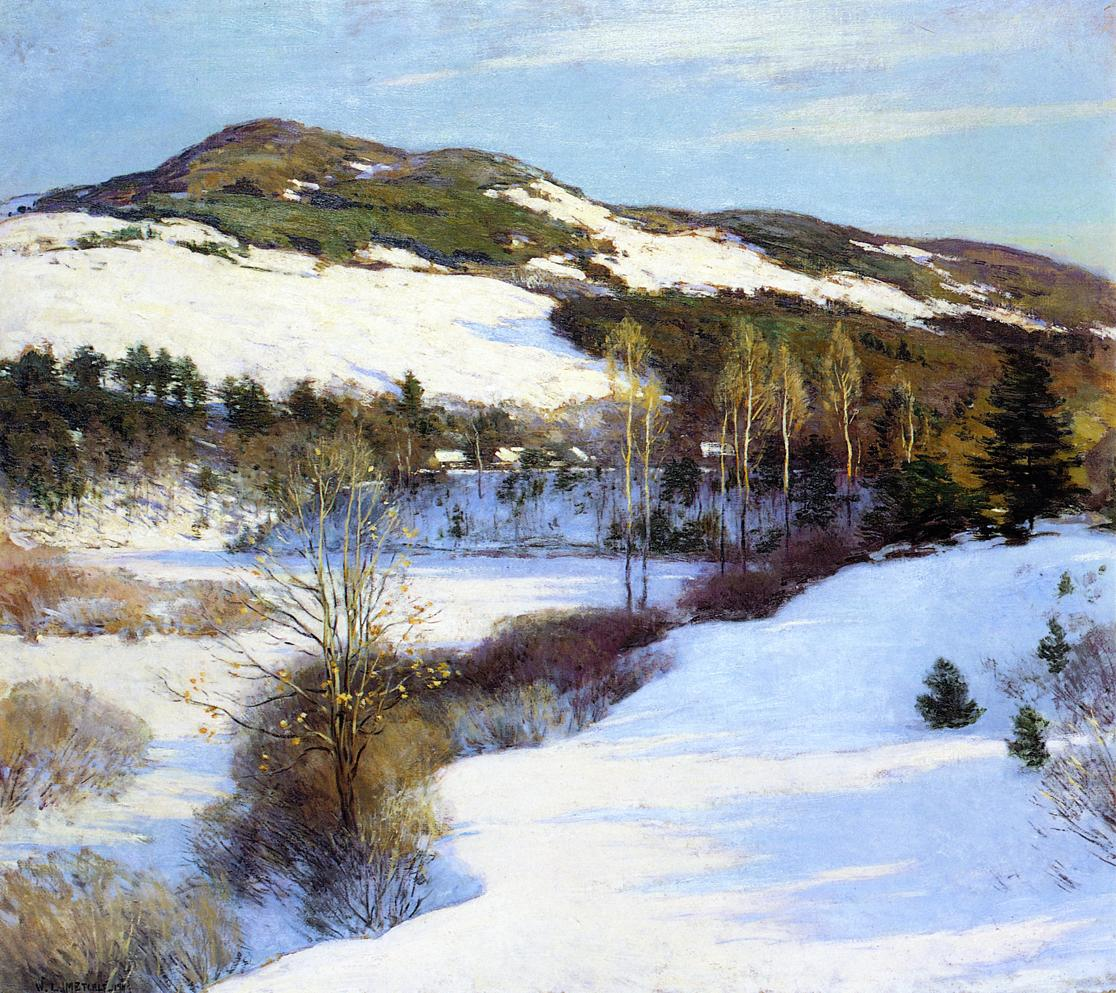
Cornish Hills, 1911, oil on canvas

== Return to America ==
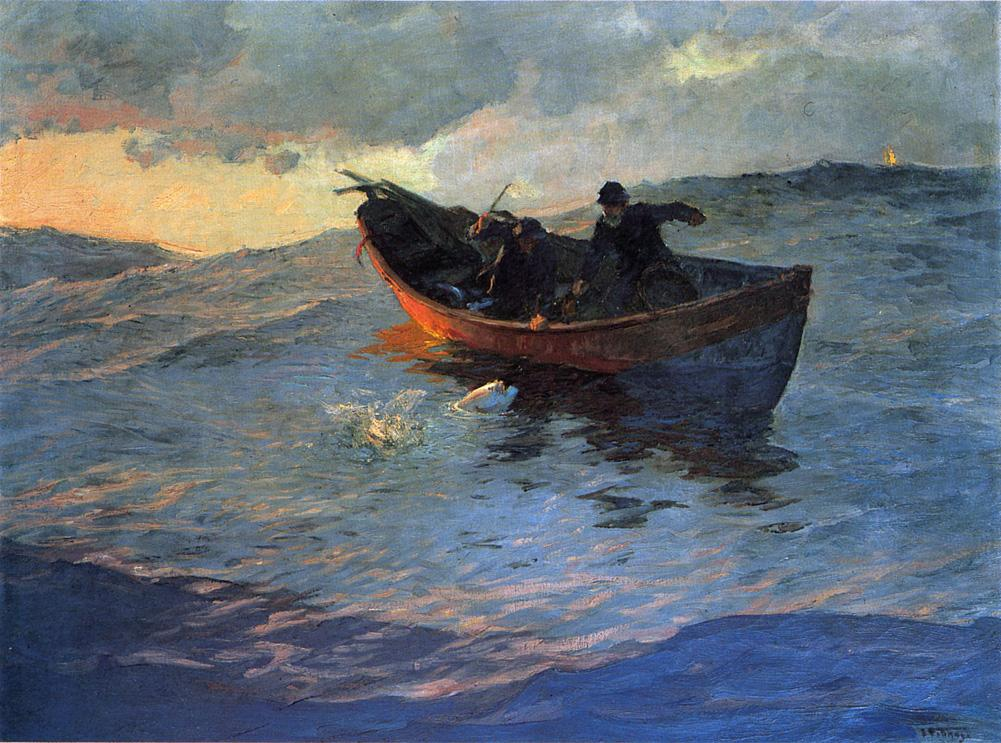
On the Suffolk Coast, 1885

Upon his return to the United States Metcalf had a solo exhibition at the St. Botolph Club in Boston. After living briefly in Philadelphia, in 1890 he opened a studio in New York, working for several years as a portrait painter, illustrator, and teacher. In 1895 he painted at Gloucester, Massachusetts, and ceased to work as an illustrator. In the late 1890s he appears to have painted little, and his contributions to the first few exhibitions of The Ten were disappointing. At the time Metcalf led a lavish social life that included heavy drinking.

In 1899 Metcalf joined his friends Robert Reid and Edward Simmons in painting murals for a New York courthouse; in this genre he was no more successful than he had been as an illustrator and portraitist. Metcalf's model for the murals was Marguerite Beaufort Hailé, a stage performer twenty years his junior, whom the artist would marry in 1903.

== Maturity ==
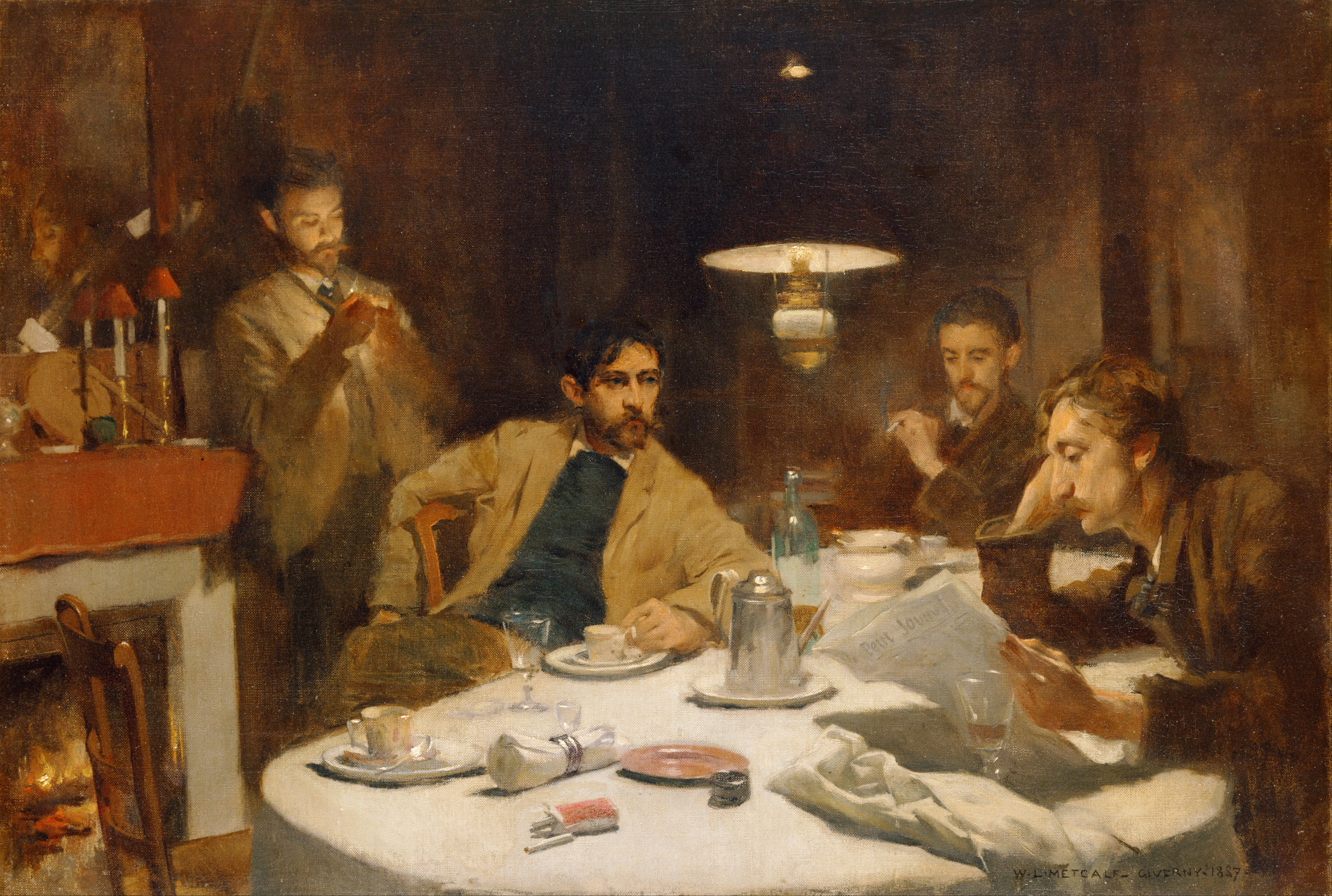
The Ten Cent Breakfast

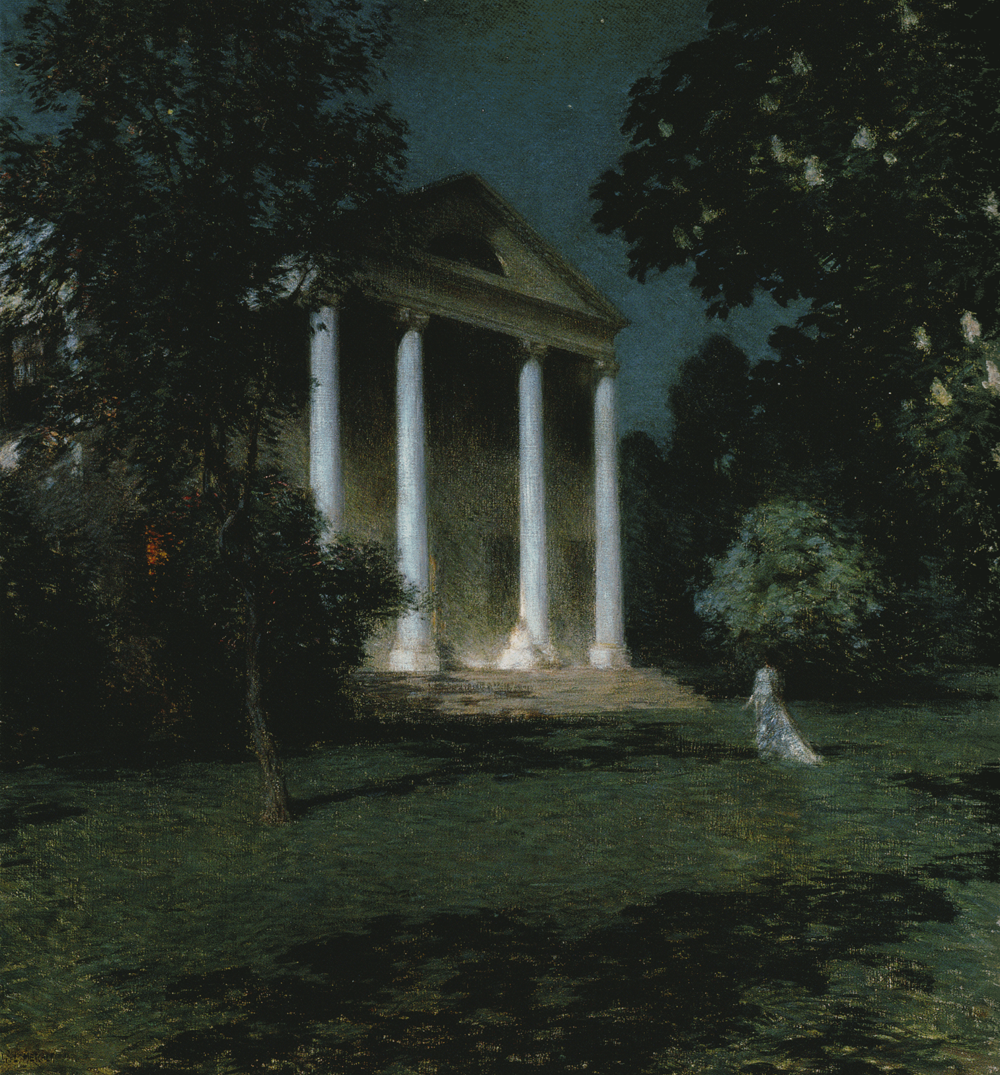
May Night, 1906, oil on canvas, National Gallery of Art

In preparation for a mural commissioned by a tobacco company, Metcalf traveled to Havana, Cuba in 1902, to make painted studies. That year he also produced a series of notable landscapes, including The Boat Landing and Battery Park-Spring. These works were characterized by a new freshness of execution and lightness of palette. In 1904 he resided and painted steadily in Clark's Cove, Maine. By 1905, at the encouragement of his friend Childe Hassam, he began summering in Old Lyme, working as both painter and teacher, and held successful exhibitions in New York and again at the St. Botolph Club. His expertly handled, subtle views of the New England landscape met with steady critical and financial success.

In 1907 May Night won the Corcoran Gallery of Art's gold medal, was honored with the top purchase prize of $3,000, and became the first contemporary American painting to be bought by that institution. It remains one of Metcalf's best known works and is now in the collection of the National Gallery of Art. In the same year his marriage to Marguerite dissolved when she eloped from Old Lyme with one of Metcalf's male students.

=== Cornish Art Colony ===
Metcalf frequently visited the Cornish Art Colony, centered in the villages of Plainfield and Cornish, New Hampshire between 1909 and 1921, often during the quiet winter seasons when many of the colony's residents had returned to the city. The colony stretched over gentle, open hills along the Connecticut River with views of Mount Ascutney in Vermont, a landscape which garnered it comparisons to Tuscany and a crop of Italianate summer homes. In 1909, Louis Shipman, a playwright and husband of landscape architect Ellen Biddle Shipman, invited Metcalf to join him for a winter in Plainfield, at his estate there, Brook Place.

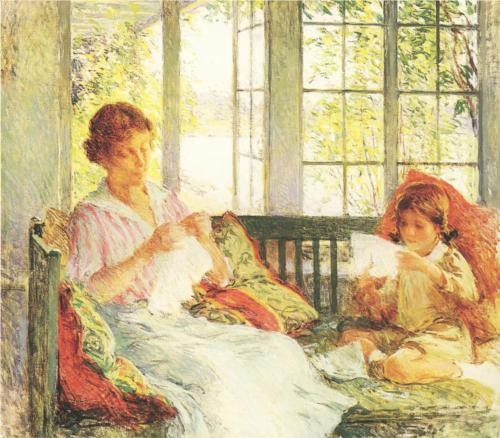
My Wife and Daughter, Willard Metcalf, 1917

Metcalf would return faithfully for many winters, and at least one summer after that. He was good friends with colonist Charles Platt, on whose Cornish estate he honeymooned, with his second wife, Henriette Alice McCrea-Metcalf in 1911. Varying year to year, he stayed with the Shipmans, or a converted grist mill close to the village of Plainfield. His frequent Cornish muse was Blow-me-down Brook, a small creek which runs through the area, and passed along his residence. Other works depict the hills, the Shipman residence or other country buildings. His production in Cornish exemplified and elevated his reputation for painting modest and intimate scenery of the changing seasons, elements which are represented in his work from the time. The pieces he produced in the Cornish area brought an unusual time of social, critical and commercial success in his life, so often filled with personal tumult. His paintings were compared with the poetry of Robert Frost, Walt Whitman, and other writers, earning him a reputation, in the words of one critic, as the "poet laureate of the New England hills."

While at the colony he painted around 35 landscapes, including Blow-Me-Down (1911), The Village-September Morning (1911) and The White Veil (1909) and the lovely, masterful "Cornish Hills" (1911).

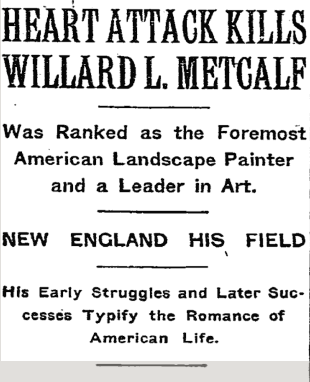
The heading of Willard Metcalf's obituary, published in the New York Times after his 1925 death, recognizes his rag to riches story as typifying "the romance of American Life."

=== Later works, death, and legacy ===
Metcalf continued to hold one-man shows in New York and Boston. During the 1910s he traveled incessantly in search of painting sites. In 1913 he spent nine months painting in Paris, Norway, England, and Italy; in the U.S., in addition to Cornish and Plainfield, New Hampshire, Metcalf lived and painted in Connecticut, Vermont, and Maine, where in 1920 he painted Benediction (now lost), a nocturne. In 1923 the painting sold for $13,000, then a record price for the work of a living American artist.

His familial strife continued when, after having two children, he and Henrietta divorced in 1920, which spurred a period of drinking and decreased productivity. However, he rebounded and painted for a number of years in Vermont, possibly returning briefly to Cornish.

The Corcoran Gallery held a large exhibition of Metcalf's work in 1925, during which the artist died of a heart attack in New York City, on March 6. He was 66.

The Florence Griswold House, where Metcalf visited and stayed in Old Lyme between 1905 and 1907, now houses the largest public collection of Metcalf's paintings and personal artifacts. A number of American museums have collected artworks by Metcalf, including the Metropolitan Museum of Art, the National Gallery of Art, the Art Institute of Chicago, the Boston Museum of Fine Arts, the Philadelphia Museum of Art, the De Young Museum, the Detroit Institute of Arts, the Freer Gallery of Art, the Smithsonian American Art Museum, the Baltimore Museum of Art, the Worcester Art Museum, the Ruth Chandler Williamson Gallery at Scripps College, the Library of Congress, the Amon Carter Museum of American Art, the Dallas Museum of Art, the Terra Foundation for American Art, Colby College Museum of Art, Yale University Art Gallery, Mead Art Museum at Amherst College, Historic Deerfield, Smith College Museum of Art, and the Seattle Art Museum. Works also appear in international collections, such as Madrid's Thyssen-Bornemisza Museum.

His ashes were scattered in Cornish, New Hampshire, by his longtime friend Charles Platt.

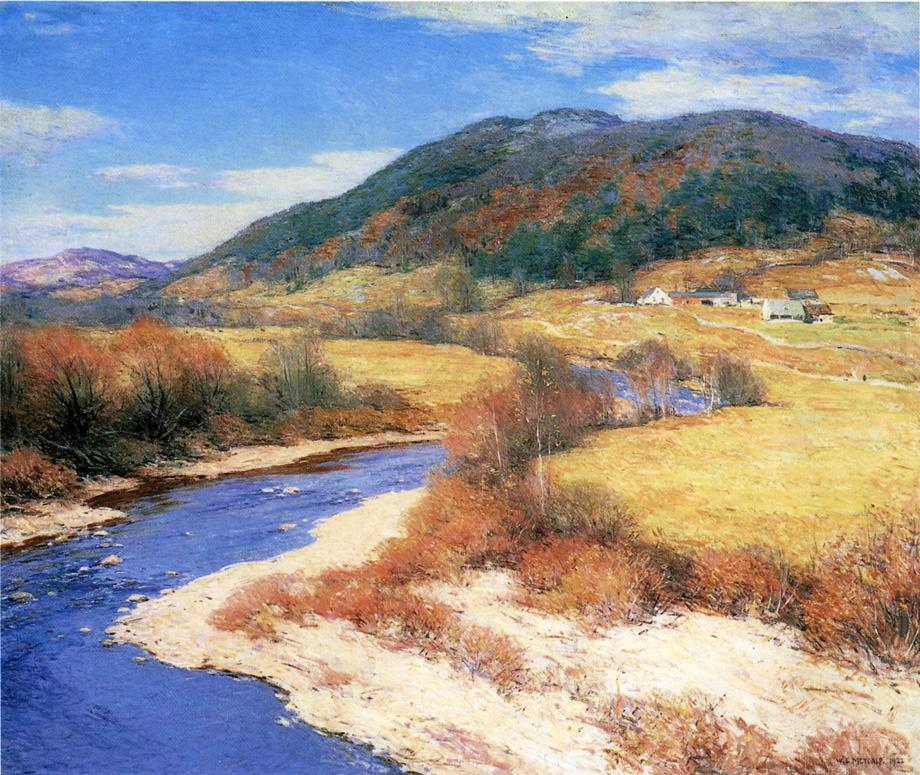
Indian Summer, Vermont, oil on canvas, 1922. Dallas Museum of Art

== Notable works ==
Summer Morning, Giverny (c. 1888), sold at Christie's for $422,500 in 2010

Midsummer Twilight (c. 1890, France), at the National Gallery of Art

May Night (1906), at the National Gallery of Art, painted in Old Lyme

The White Veil (1909), Rhode Island School of Design Museum

- He painted this in Plainfield by the Shipman house, and later created a second copy, The White Veil (no. 2), now at the Detroit Institute of Arts, upon return to New York. It was among his best winter landscapes and received critical praise at an exhibition with the Ten American Painters.

The Village- September Morning (1911), the Hevrdejs Collection, his only depiction of Plainfield Village

Benediction (1923), now lost, gained greatest sum for a work by a living American artist

== See also ==
- The Cornish Hills (1911)
- List of Orientalist artists
- Orientalism
