= Lyme Art Association =

Art organization in Old Lyme, Connecticut, USA

Lyme Art Association Gallery
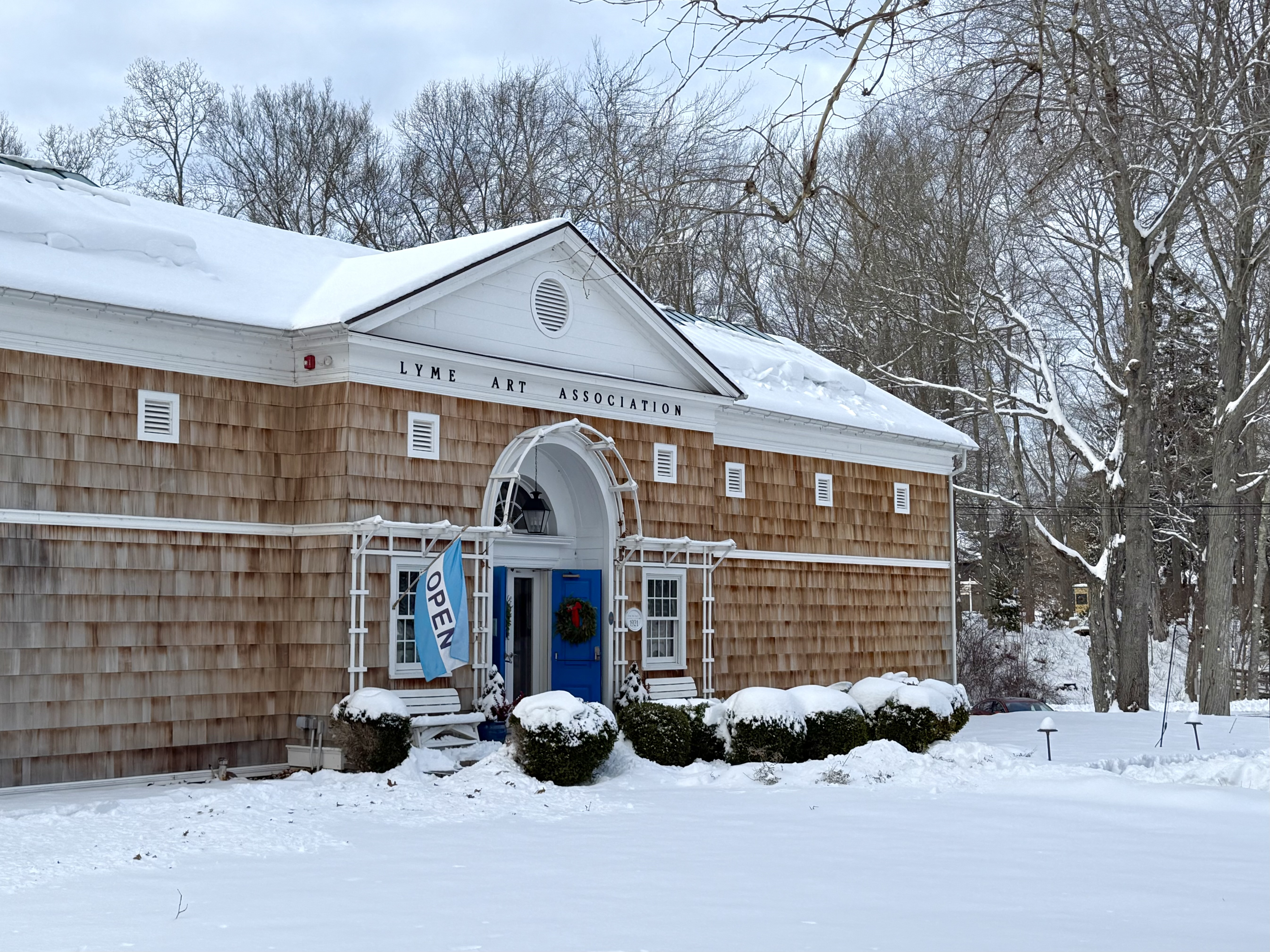
- Lyme Art Association gallery (December 2025)

General information
- Architectural style: Shingle style
- Location: 90 Lyme Street, Old Lyme, Connecticut, United States
- Opened: August 6, 1921

Design and construction
- Architecture firm: Charles A. Platt
- Lyme Art Association
- U.S. National Register of Historic Places
- Coordinates: 41°19′18″N 72°19′40″W
- NRHP reference No.: 71000916
- Added to NRHP: October 14, 1971

Lyme Art Association (LAA) is a nonprofit art organization established in 1914, with roots going back to 1902. The LAA maintains a historic art gallery located at 90 Lyme Street in the Old Lyme Historic District, Old Lyme, Connecticut. The gallery was built in 1921 to a design prepared by the architect and artist Charles A. Platt. The association holds exhibitions throughout the year, featuring the work of member artists as well as visiting ones, with an emphasis on representational art. The building has a north-light studio, where the association conducts classes year-round.

== Origins ==
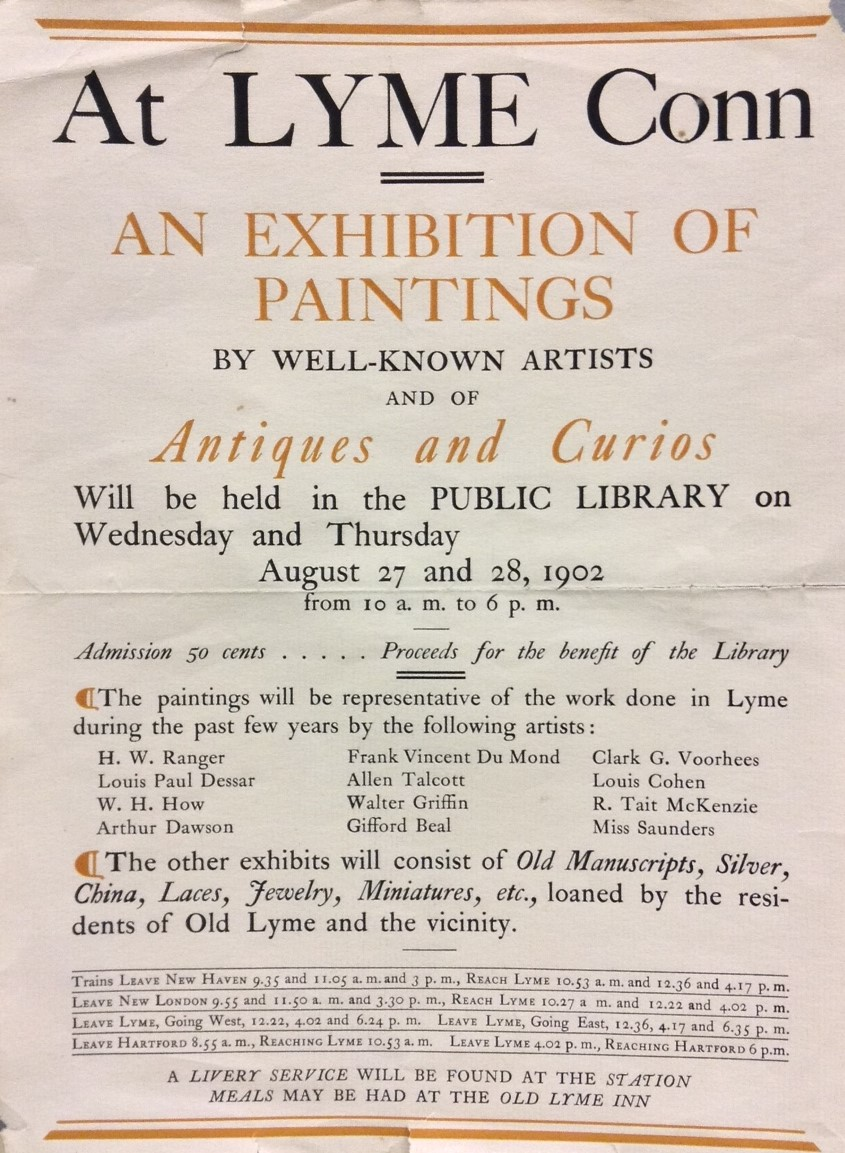
A 1902 flyer announcing an “Exhibition of Paintings”

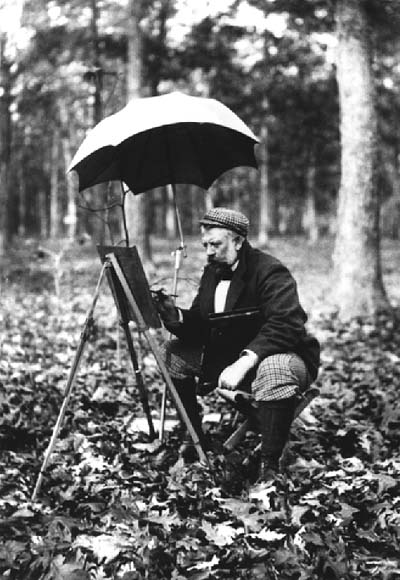
Henry Ward Ranger

The LAA is an outgrowth of the Old Lyme art colony, established by Henry Ward Ranger, a leading tonalist painter from New York. After visiting Old Lyme in 1899, Ranger returned the following year with like-minded tonalist painters. Boarding at the house of Florence Griswold, now the Florence Griswold Museum, they painted scenes of the local countryside.

In the summer of 1902, the administrators of the nearby public library invited the group to hold a two-day exhibition at the library. Art enthusiasts travelling to the show from New York and Boston boosted sales and some of the proceeds were donated to the library. The show, consisting entirely of landscape paintings depicting the local countryside, included the work of Tonalists such as Henry Ward Ranger, Allen Butler Talcott, Clark Voorhees, Frank DuMond, William Henry Howe, Gifford Beal, Walter Griffin, Louis Paul Dessar, Arthur Dawson, and Lewis Cohen.

Each summer, large crowds would travel to the annual exhibitions, travelling by train to see the work at the library. In 1903, Childe Hassam was the sole Impressionist among the tonalist exhibition, and his presence marked a turning point among the painters toward a more impressionist style. In 1905, the Impressionist painter Willard Metcalf exhibited two works at the library. Over the course of the twentieth century, artists such as Bruce Crane, Henry Rankin Poore, Robert Vonnoh, Bessie Potter Vonnoh, Matilda Browne, Charles Bittinger, Margaret Miller Cooper, Lawton S. Parker, Everett Warner, Ivan Olinsky, George Henry Bogert, Wilson Irvine, Edward Volkert, Carleton Wiggins, Guy C. Wiggins, Harry L. Hoffman, Edward F. Rook, Lydia Longacre, Clifford Grayson, Tosca Olinsky, Lawton S. Parker, Gertrude Nason, W. Langdon Kihn, Henry Kreis, Alphaeus P. Cole, Roger Dennis, Hugh DeHaven, Elisabeth Gordon Chandler, Jessie Hull Mayer, William S. Robinson, Frank Bicknell and Will Howe Foote would exhibit in the annual shows.

== The group incorporates ==
By 1913, the artists began to discuss building a permanent art gallery in town. Poor lighting at the library had become an issue. Furthermore, as many as forty artists were now exhibiting in the summer shows, and the library’s gallery space was inadequate. In April 1914, the artists held an exhibition in New York City, managed by Florence Griswold, to raise money for a new building.

On Friday, June 26, 1914, the artists and a group of local townspeople held a meeting at Griswold’s house, at which they approved articles of incorporation for the association (later renamed the Lyme Art Association) drawn up by Judge Walter C. Noyes. The group elected Noyes to be the association’s first president.

In July 1914, the group filed a certificate of incorporation with the State of Connecticut, signed by Noyes, Joseph S. Huntington, and artists Lewis Cohen, William S. Robinson, and Frank Bicknell. The new organization stated its intention to raise $40,000 for the construction of a permanent art gallery in Old Lyme.

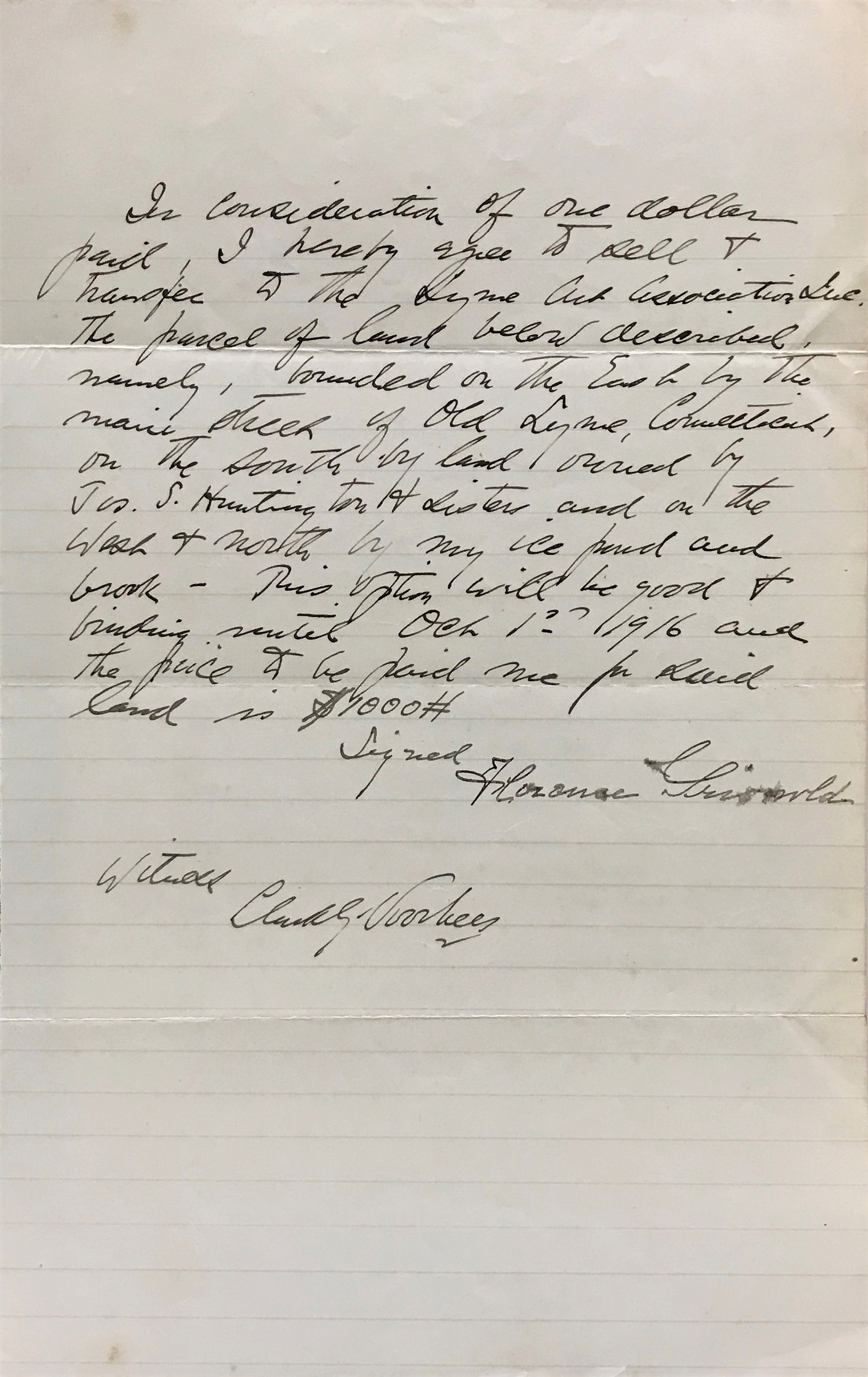
Florence Griswold Site Option for the Lyme Art Association, 1914

They sought to build, as one newspaper put it:

"...the long-awaited Temple of Art, which will serve as the association's home and the center of an artistic movement with unprecedented national influence."

== Building the gallery ==
In 1914, the association commissioned plans for an art gallery from New York architect Richard A. Walker, to cost $14,000, but with the outbreak of World War I in 1914, it postponed plans to build a new gallery.

The association did not choose a site for the new building until 1917, when it purchased land from Florence Griswold, on Lyme Street, just south of her house. The cost was $1,000.

In July 1919, the association voted to join forces with the town of Old Lyme to build a new town hall, with the agreement that the association could hold their annual exhibition in the new building for one month each summer. The LAA withdrew from the project in December, when the town objected to any group having exclusive use of the town hall.

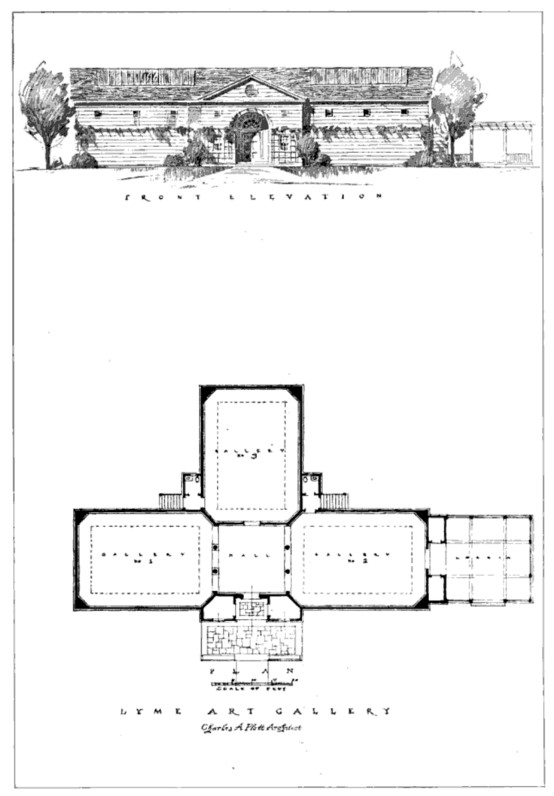
Charles A. Platt plan for Lyme Art Association 1920

In 1920, the association commissioned American Renaissance architect Charles A. Platt to design the association’s new gallery, a design that he donated to the group. Due to the fact the artists were self-funding and the resources were limited, the artists asked him to lower the skylights of his initial design, which he reluctantly agreed to do. New London-based contractors Canning & Leary were awarded the contract to construct Platt's final design, for a building cost of $20,000. Artist Lawton S. Parker chaired the building committee for LAA working with Charles Platt. Work on the construction of the gallery began in September 1920.

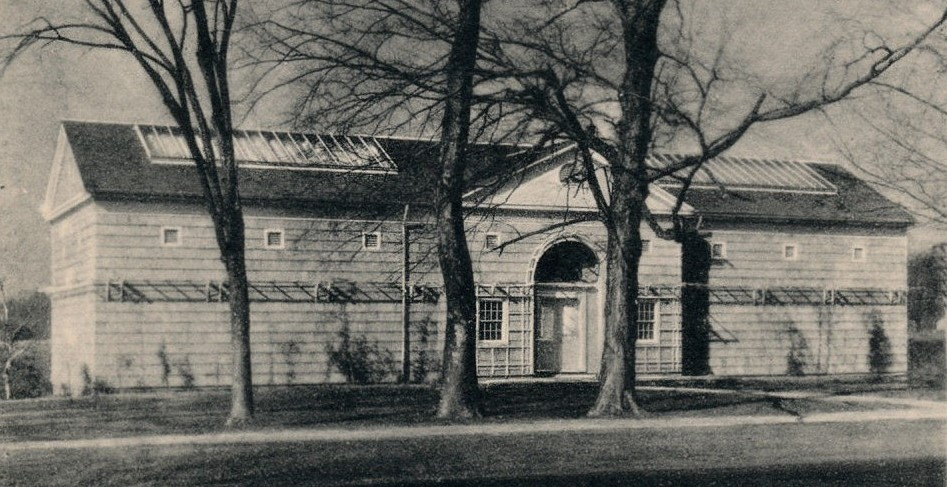
Lyme Art Association in 1922

On August 6, 1921, the Lyme Art Association Gallery was unveiled. The building measured 25'x88' with a wing 25'x32' and one high story. The gallery was built in a T-shape, with trellises wrapping around the back of the structure, which were ready to collect the vines that were beginning to grow. The building featured "white-dipped" shingles. The New York Times wrote about the unveiling:

"Greater appropriateness, beauty of proportions and refinement of taste could hardly be found. The building belongs to the location as completely as a Connecticut wildflower to the countryside...to come upon it in the pleasant landscape is recognize it immediately as an embodiment of art in harmony with its natural surroundings"

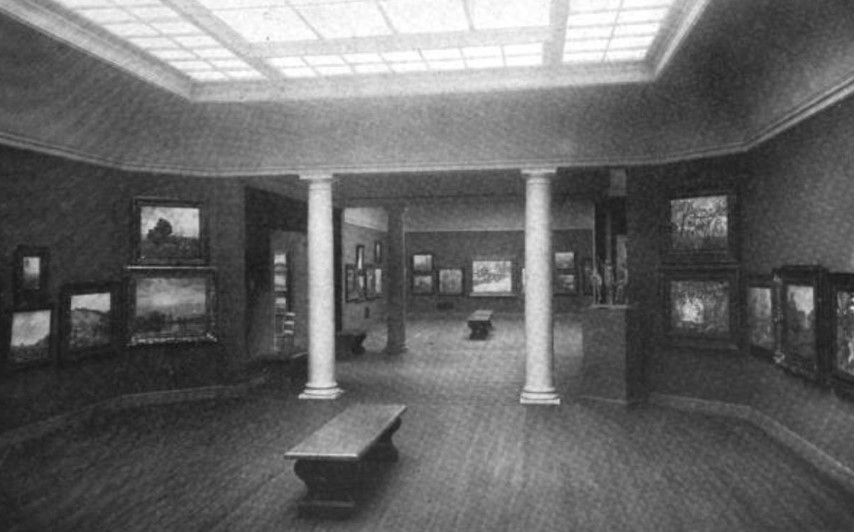
Lyme Art Association Gallery inaugural exhibition August 1921

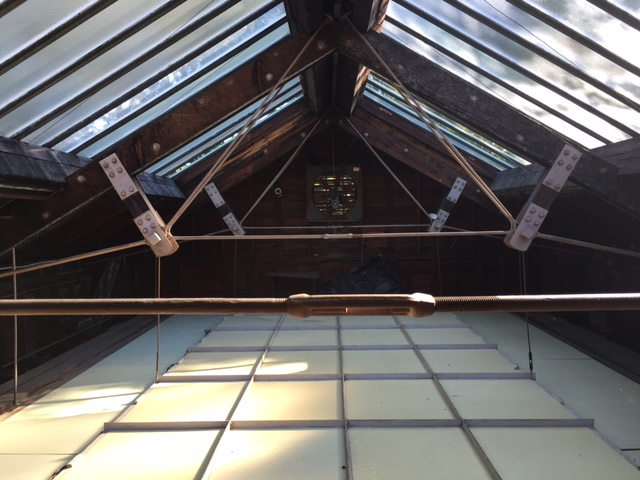
Skylights above laylights at Lyme Art Association

Inside, the walls were "dusky-blue" with "a faint suggestion of gold". The lighting from the skylights was considered perfect, with an even distribution of natural light on the walls. This was made possible by a translucent ceiling of white muslin laylights below the skylights. Inside the gallery, four large pillars stand, which can be removed to create one hall.

Florence Griswold was the first gallery manager of the new building.

== Goodman Gallery ==
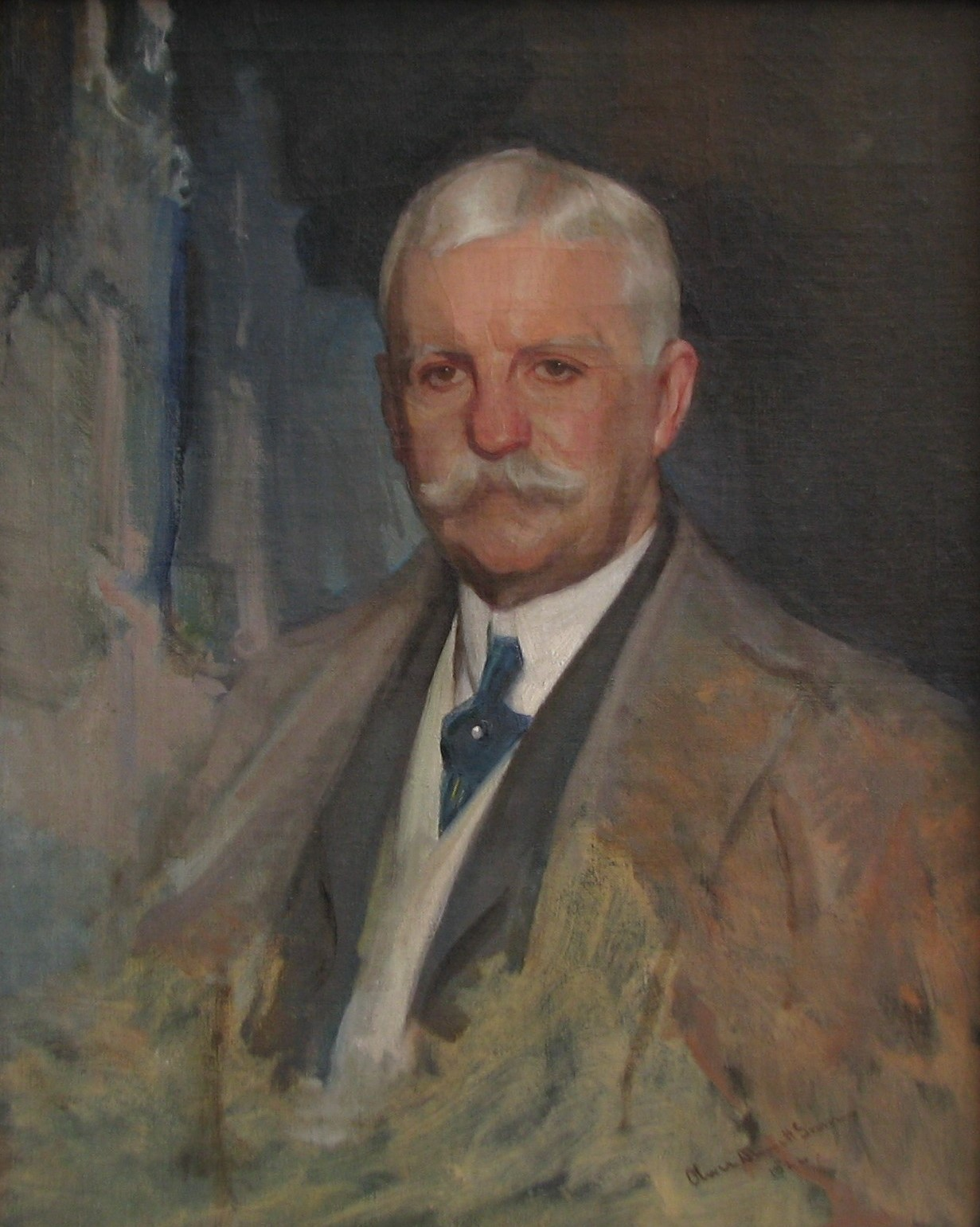
1922 painting of Honorary Lyme Art Association President William O. Goodman by Oliver Dennett Grover

On June 11, 1938 the Lyme Art Association unveiled an additional wing, which it named the Goodman Gallery. Funds for the gallery were given by Erna Sawyer Goodman in memory of her husband, lumber tycoon William O. Goodman, who had been an honorary president of the association and a sponsor of many of its prizes. The builder of the new gallery, L.H. Tiffany, copied Platt's original design for the new gallery, but built it several steps lower, with two French doors leading out to a balcony that once overlooked a lily pond.

== Art studio ==
In 1975 sculptor Elisabeth Gordon Chandler was elected president of LAA. In 1976, she founded a separate institution, Lyme Academy of Fine Arts, and made extensive alterations to accommodate it.

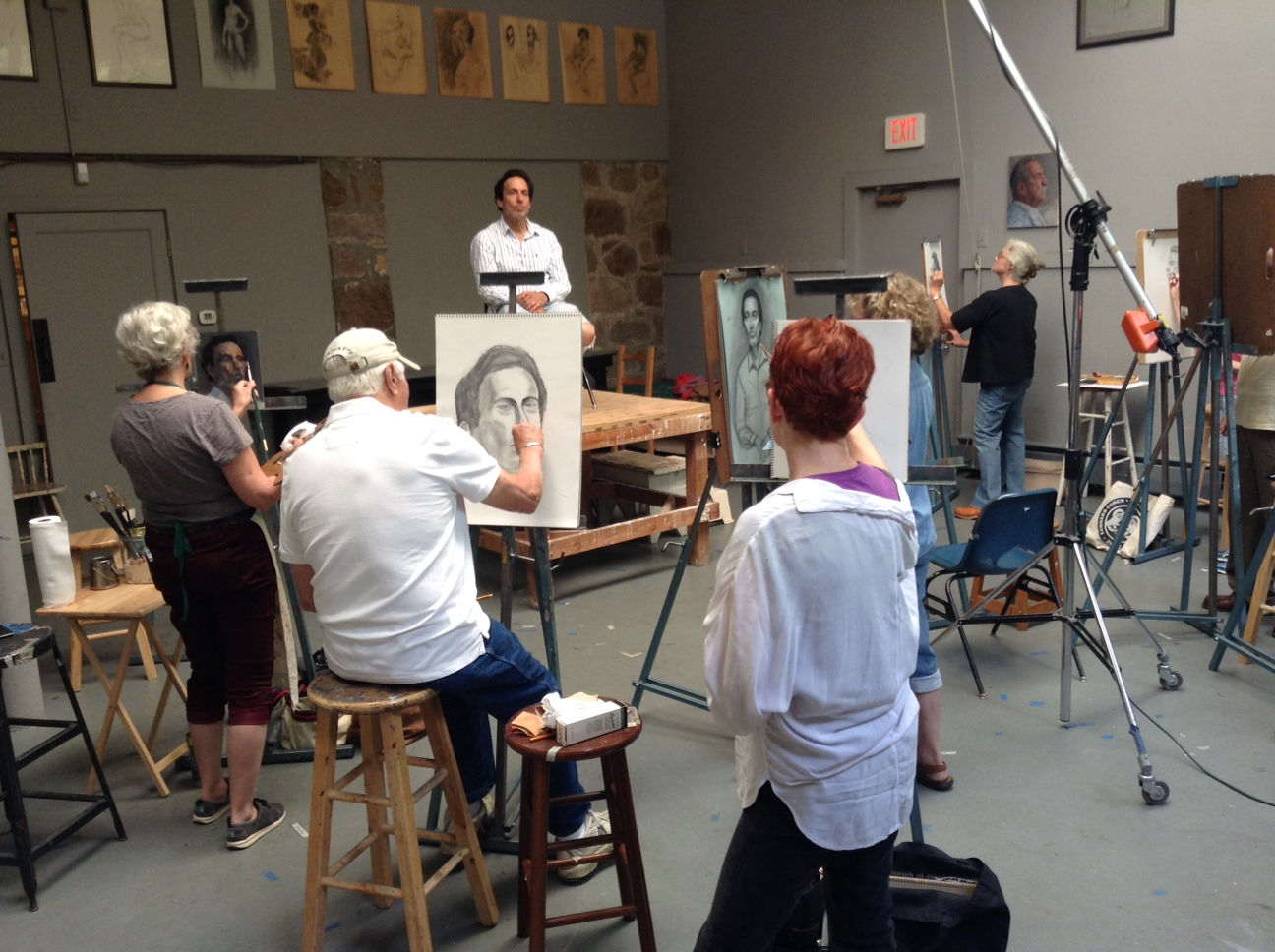
Portrait Class in Lyme Art Association studio

In 1978, she completed a two-story art studio, and transformed the basement to accommodate a library, offices, and storage rooms. Artists such as Robert Brackman, Deane G. Keller, and Lou Bonamarte, along with Chandler, taught in the space leased by the Academy.

In June 1982, an historic flood hit Old Lyme. A brook running behind the association was blocked with debris, causing five feet of water to fill the studio and downstairs offices occupied by the Academy. Nevertheless, the academy continued to hold classes at the LAA until 1996 when its twenty-year lease expired.

== Exhibitions and events ==
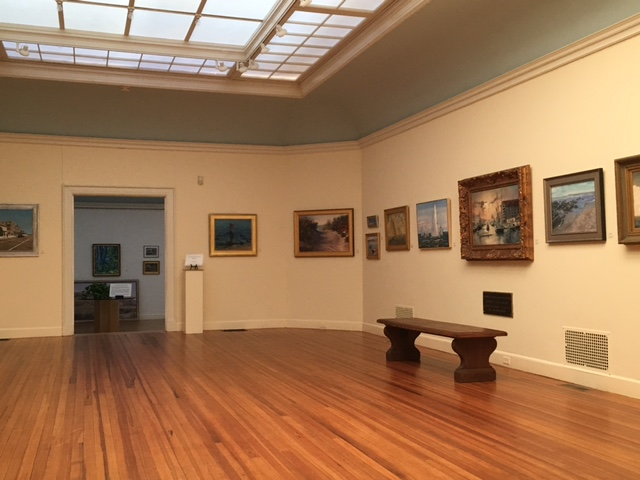
Alphaeus P. Cole Gallery at Lyme Art Association

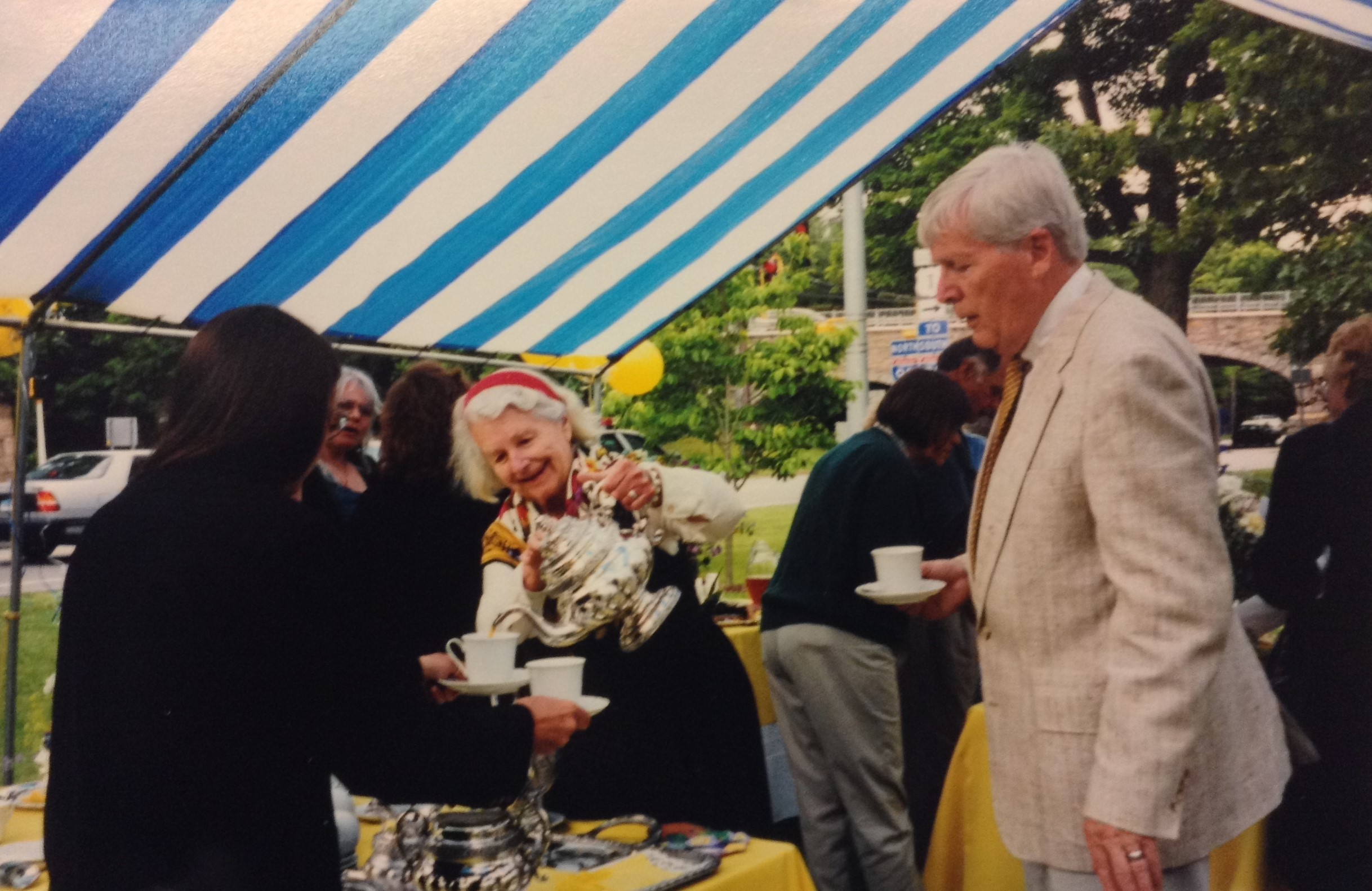
Lyme Art Association members serving tea during Centennial Exhibition in 2002

In 1921, during the 20th annual exhibition, Wilson Irvine was awarded the William S. Eaton Purchase Prize for his painting "Lingering Snow". The 20th annual exhibition in the new gallery had a paid attendance of over 5,000, with sales of artwork exceeding $10,000.

In the 21st Annual Exhibition in 1922 Ivan Olinsky was awarded the first award under the Museum Purchase Plan, a program instituted to place LAA member work in associate museum members. Olinsky's painting "Leonore in a Russian Blouse" was allotted to the Dayton Art Institute.

1933 saw Lyme Art Association extend the exhibition season with their First Annual Autumn Exhibition.

In October 1971, Lyme Art Association was included in the Old Lyme Historic District which was named to the National Register of Historic Places. This process was carried out by Mrs. John Crosby Brown, then President of the Lyme Historical Society-Florence Griswold Association.

In 1972, heating was installed in the LAA gallery, allowing exhibitions to take place during the colder months.

The Center Gallery was renamed the Alphaeus P. Cole Gallery in 1976. Cole, a noted local artist and member of LAA, was honored by the association in tribute of his 100th birthday.

In 1996, a major retrospective at LAA was held to commemorate the 75th anniversary of the gallery. Works by Henry Ward Ranger, Bruce Crane, Robert Vonnoh, Willard Metcalf, Childe Hassam, Carleton Wiggins, Guy C. Wiggins and William Chadwick were featured. Artwork by Ornithologist Roger Tory Peterson was also on display. Also featured was the Goodman Presentation Case, consisting of 35 small works by early Lyme artists, which were originally presented to LAA honorary President William O. Goodman.

In 1997, a footbridge linking Florence Griswold Museum and LAA was built, a project proposed by the museum.

In 2002 LAA held a centennial exhibition to commemorate the first exhibition at the Phoebe Griffin Noyes Library in 1902. 130 early works of 76 of the early members were displayed along with work by current members. During the exhibition, Lieutenant Governor Jodi Rell visited the gallery and declared July 8 "Lyme Art Association Day" to honor the centennial. Additionally, LAA featured a retrospective of the work of Deane G. Keller, entitled "Go Figure", concurrent with the Centennial Exhibition.

In 2005, the gallery held a retrospective exhibition of the architect of Lyme Art Association, Charles A. Platt, featuring many of his paintings and etchings.

In 2010, a flood sent two feet of water into the basement of LAA, causing more than $60,000 worth of damage, and the loss of archival material.

In 2014, the widow of artist and teacher Foster Caddell gave a generous gift to LAA's endowment. The south gallery was renamed Caddell Gallery during the 94th Annual Elected Artist Exhibition the following year.

LAA is embarking on a Second Century Campaign, to restore the historic gallery building.

A large collection of Lyme Art Association archives was donated by Lyme Academy College of Fine Arts to the association in 2017. The archival material, from the estate of Elisabeth Gordon Chandler, is to be on permanent display in the Lyme Art Association gallery.

In 2018, Laurie Pavlos was named executive director of the organization.

During March 2020, LAA made the decision to cancel the opening reception to "Yin and Yang" show, and close the gallery until the end of the month due to the COVID-19 pandemic. The gallery officially reopened to the public on June 26, 2020 with two new exhibitions.

The Florence Griswold Museum is holding a "Centennial of the Lyme Art Association Gallery" exhibition during 2020 and 2021, commemorating the anniversary of the building of the gallery and the Twentieth Annual Exhibition. Beginning in 2021, Lyme Art Association is embarking on phase two of its Second Century Campaign, to replace the gallery's skylights and laylights, as well as add insulation to the historic structure.

== Association presidents ==
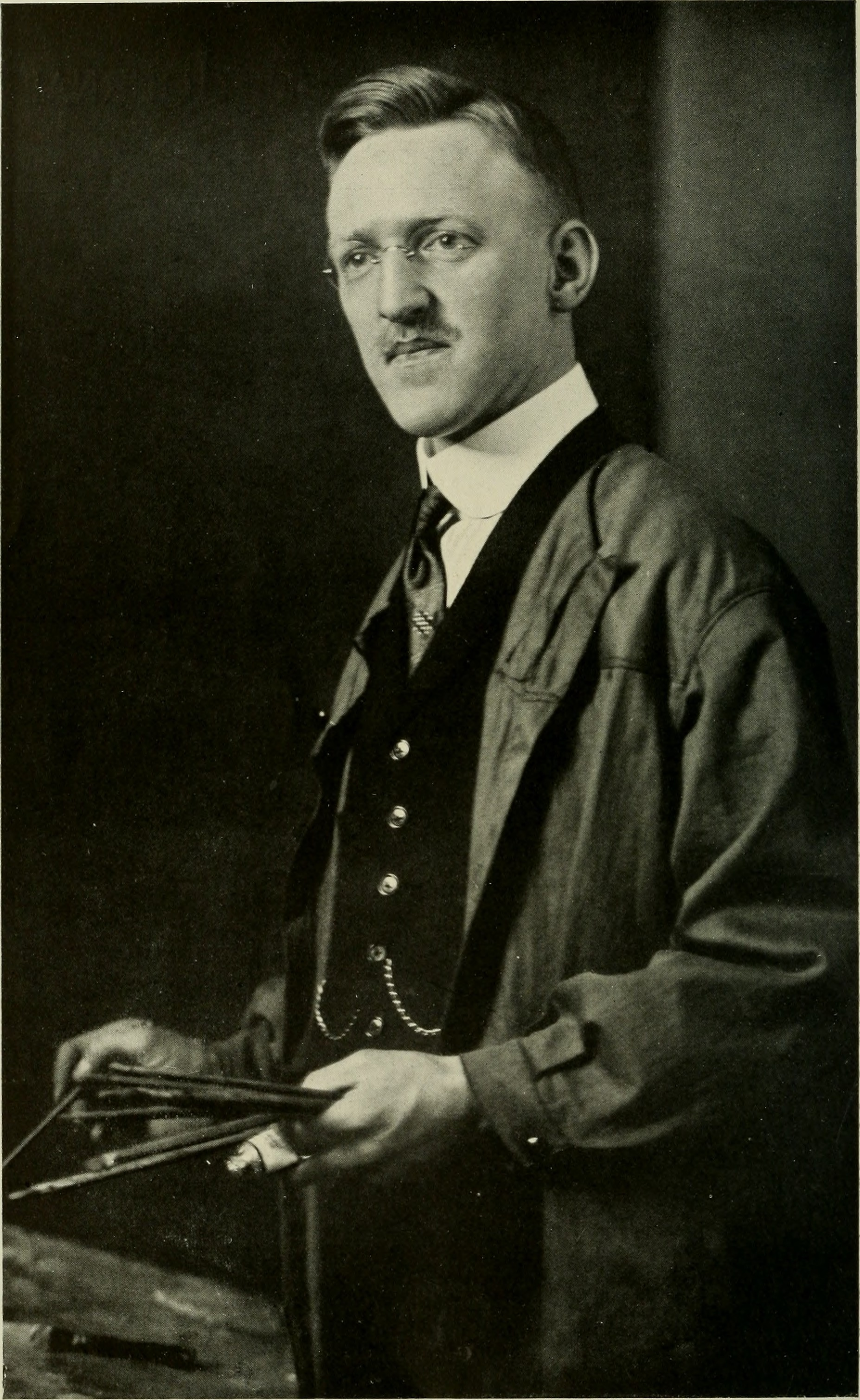
Will S. Taylor (1882-1968), sixth president of Lyme Art Association

Presidents of Lyme Art Association:

- Walter C. Noyes 1914-1921
- William Henry Howe 1921-1922
- William O. Goodman 1922-1932
- William S. Robinson 1932-1934
- E. Gregory Smith 1934-1958
- Will S. Taylor 1958-1964
- Bertram G. Bruestle 1964-1967
- Frederick Buchholz 1967-1971
- Edwin R. Maynard 1971-1975
- Elisabeth Gordon Chandler 1975-1978
- H. Gil Roberts 1978-1980
- Sultana Hanniford 1980-1982
- William Babcock 1982-1994
- Norman W. Legassie 1994-1996
- Donna Gilberto 1996-1997
- Joann Ballinger 1997-1998
- Mary Worthen 1998-1999
- Anne Bingham Pierson 1999-2001
- Richard J. Christofferson 2001-2002
- Jerry Litner 2002-2006
- Rich Nazzaro 2006-2007
- Barbara Lussier 2007-2008
- Katherine Simmons 2008-2019
- Emily Reynolds 2019-2020
- Harley Bartlett 2020-2022
- Beverly Schirmeier 2022-2024
- Michael Centrella 2024-present
