= Mary Cummings Browne Hatch =

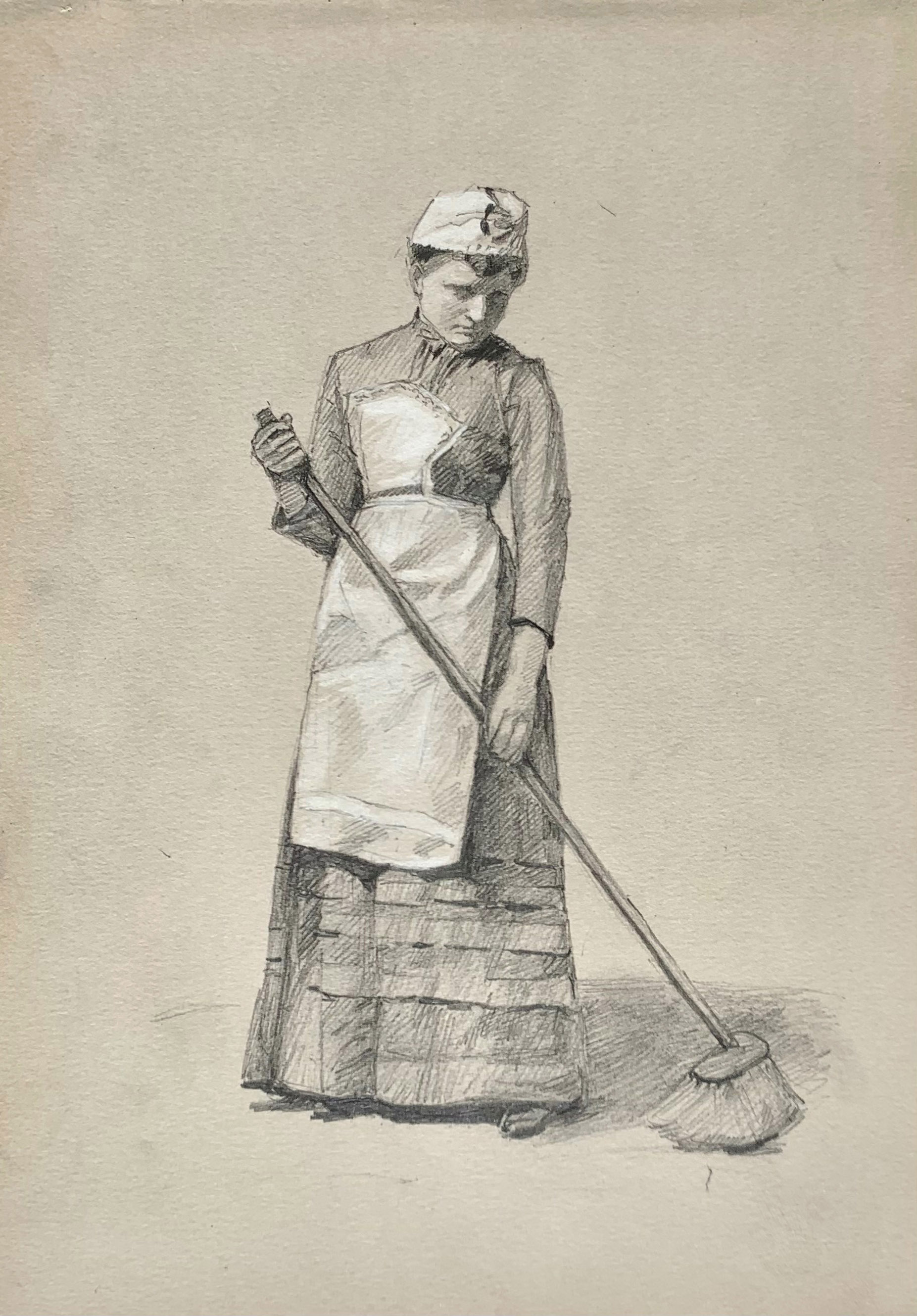
- Woman Sweeping by Mary Cummings Brown Hatch
- Born: July 21, 1861; Newark
- Died: July 7, 1939; Cleveland
- Occupation: Etcher
- Spouse(s): Henry Reynolds Hatch, Mattoon Monroe Curtis
- Relatives: Matilda Browne

Mary Cummings Browne Hatch Curtis (July 21, 1861 – July 7, 1939) was an American etcher and artist.

== Life and career ==
Mary Cummings Browne was born on July 21, 1861 in Newark, New Jersey, the daughter of Leonard Perkins Browne and Matilda Bieden Culver Browne. Her sister was the painter Matilda Browne. As a child, her neighbors in Newark were Thomas Moran and Mary Nimmo Moran and she may have studied art with them as her sister had.

In the 1880s, Browne exhibited at the Salmagundi Club, the Pennsylvania Academy of Fine Arts, and the New York Etching Club. Twelve of her works were included in the seminal exhibition Women Etchers of America at the Boston Museum of Fine Arts. Her work was included in the Art Interchange in 1885 and 1886 and the Little Ones Annual in 1887.

Following her marriage, she relocated to Cleveland, Ohio. In the 1920s and 30s, she exhibited etchings, pottery, and textiles at the Cleveland Museum of Art.

Her work is included in the collections of the Boston Museum of Fine Arts and Cleveland Museum of Art.

== Personal life ==
In 1887, Browne became the second wife of Henry Reynolds Hatch, a wealthy bank director. His daughter Alice Gertrude Hatch, wife of Charles Lathrop Pack, was a school friend of Browne's. They had three children before Henry Hatch died in 1914. In 1924, she married Mattoon M. Curtis, philosophy professor at Western Reserve University and vice president of the Cleveland School of Art.

Mary Cummings Browne Hatch died on 7 July 1939 in Cleveland.
