= Edward Francis Rook =

American painter

- Born: September 21, 1870; New York City, US
- Died: October 25, 1960 (aged 90); Old Lyme, Connecticut
- Occupations: American Impressionist landscape and marine painter
- Spouse: Edith Stone

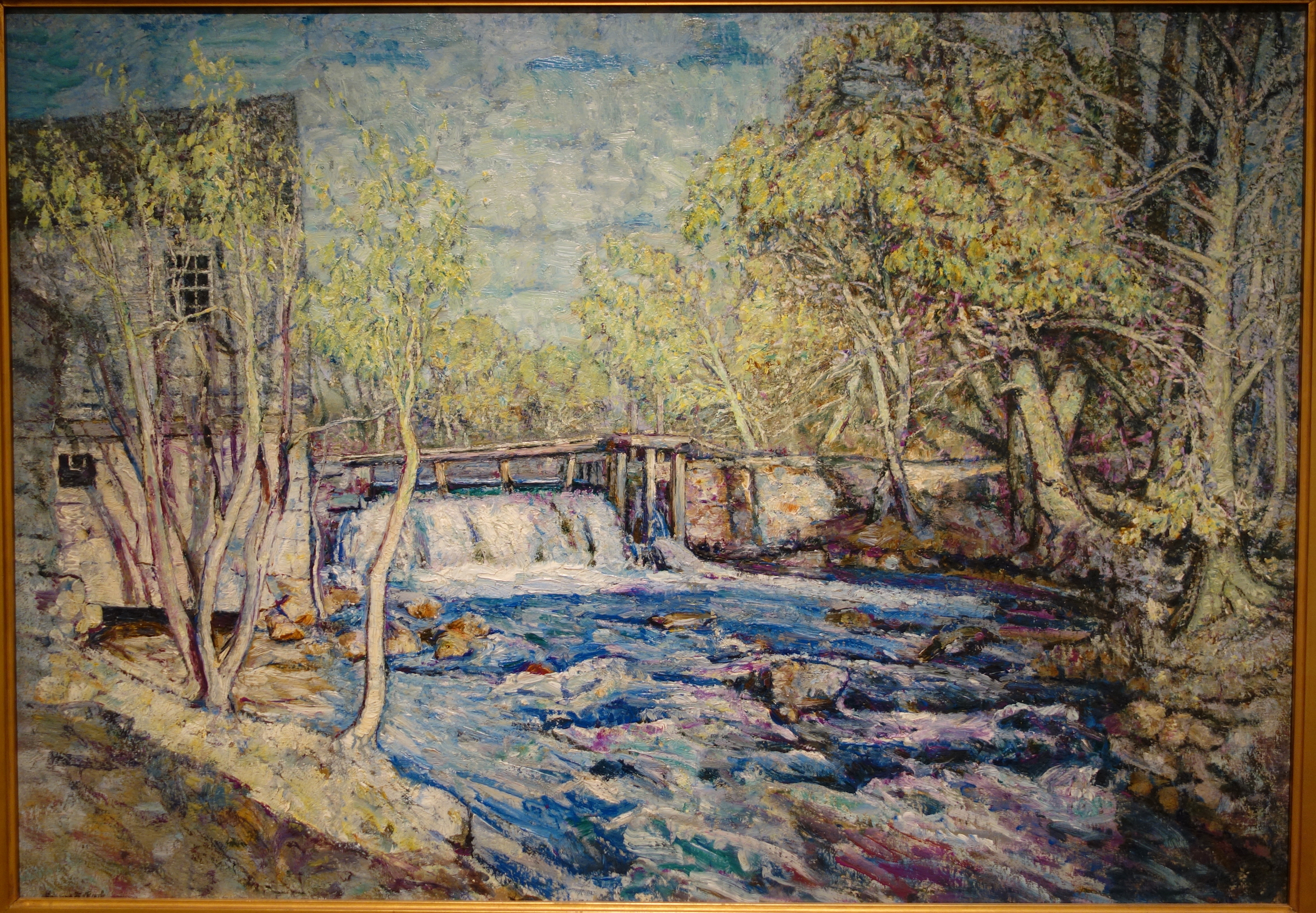
Bradberry's Mill Dam in Spring (c.1910-15) by Edward Francis Rook, New Britain Museum of American Art

Edward Francis Rook (September 21, 1870 – October 25, 1960) was an American Impressionist landscape and marine painter, and a member of the art colony at Old Lyme, Connecticut.

== Biography ==
Rook was born in New York City. He studied at the Art Students League of New York under John Twachtman from 1889 to 1891. He studied further in Paris at the Académie Julian under Jean-Joseph Benjamin-Constant and Jean-Paul Laurens, then at the École des Beaux-Arts under Jean-Léon Gérôme.

Rook returned to the United States in 1900, and married a childhood friend, Edith Stone, in 1901. They travelled to Canada and California, and spent close to a year in Mexico. Rook had known Childe Hassam in France, and painted with him at Old Lyme during the summer of 1903. After living in New York City, the Rooks settled in Old Lyme in April 1905.

Rook was a recluse and a bit of an eccentric. In Henry Rankin Poore's mural The Fox Chase (1905), at the Florence Griswold Museum, he is depicted in the background, carrying two large canvases and ignoring the tomfoolery of the other artists. Rook collected cars and built a house around his garage, although he never learned to drive.

=== Exhibitions, awards and honors ===
Rook exhibited one work, Moonrise, Normandy, at the 1893 World's Columbian Exposition in Chicago, Illinois. He exhibited regularly at the Pennsylvania Academy of the Fine Arts from 1897 to 1913 and 1917 to 1919, which awarded him its 1898 Temple Gold Medal (for Pearl Clouds—Moonlight). He was awarded a bronze medal at the 1901 Pan-American Exposition in Buffalo, New York (for Pearl Clouds—Moonlight, The Mountain Brook, and The Inn—Moonlight); two silver medals at the 1904 World's Fair in St. Louis, Missouri (for his oil-on-canvas landscapes of Mexico, and for a pastel: Horse Market); a silver medal at the 1910 Exposición Internacional del Centenario in Buenos Aires, Argentina (for Canada in Snow); and a gold medal at the 1915 Panama-Pacific International Exhibition in San Francisco (for Snow, Ice and Foam). The Corcoran Gallery of Art awarded him its 1919 bronze medal (for Peonies). He exhibited at the Lyme Art Association from 1904 to 1943, which awarded him its 1929 first prize (for Reflections in a Samovar).

He was elected an Associate of the National Academy of Design in 1908, and an Academician in 1924.

Rook died in Old Lyme in 1960. A retrospective exhibition of his work was held in 1987 at the Florence Griswold Museum, which holds a number of his works. His works are also in the collections of the Pennsylvania Academy of the Fine Arts, the National Academy Museum, the Cincinnati Art Museum, the New Britain Museum of American Art and other museums, along with various Connecticut institutions.
