= Margaret Miller Cooper =

American painter

- Born: Margaret Miller; March 4, 1872; Terryville, Connecticut
- Died: May 18, 1965 (aged 93); New Britain, Connecticut
- Resting place: Fairview Cemetery, New Britain, Connecticut
- Movement: American Impressionism
- Spouse: Elisha Hilliard Cooper (m. 1901)

Margaret Miller Cooper (March 3, 1872 – May 18, 1965) was an American Impressionist painter noted for her luminous landscapes and seascapes of New England, Florida, and the Caribbean. Trained at the Art Students League, Pratt Institute, and the National Academy of Design, she exhibited widely—including at the Corcoran Gallery of Art, the Pennsylvania Academy of the Fine Arts, and the Wadsworth Atheneum—and was an active member of the National Association of Women Painters and Sculptors and the Lyme Art Association.

In 1936 a critic for Art Digest said Cooper painted her cheerful landscapes with the "loving and pensive sympathy of long association".

== Early life and training ==
Cooper was born in Terryville, Connecticut, on March 4, 1872. She was drawn to art as a child and by age 9 had begun making paintings. After graduating from Smith College in 1897, she studied at the Art Students League, Pratt Institute, and the National Academy of Design. Her instructors included Guy C. Wiggins, Charles Herbert Woodbury, Henry B. Snell, and Robert Brackman. She made her home in New Britain, Connecticut, and usually spent the summer months in the artist community at Old Lyme, Connecticut.

== Career in art ==
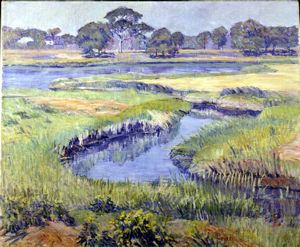
Margaret Miller Cooper, about 1924, The Marshes, oil on canvas, 25 x 30 inches

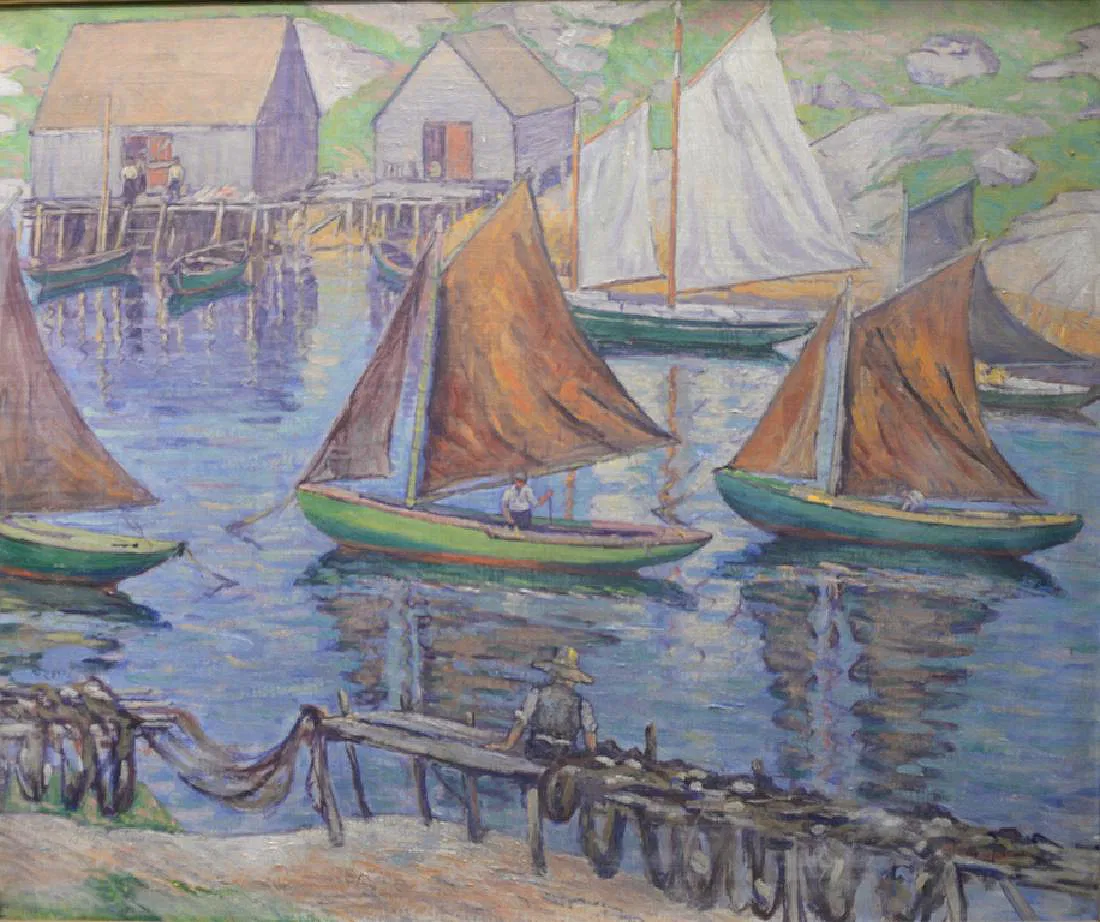
Margaret Miller Cooper, 1930, Drying Sails, oil on canvas, 25 x 30 inches

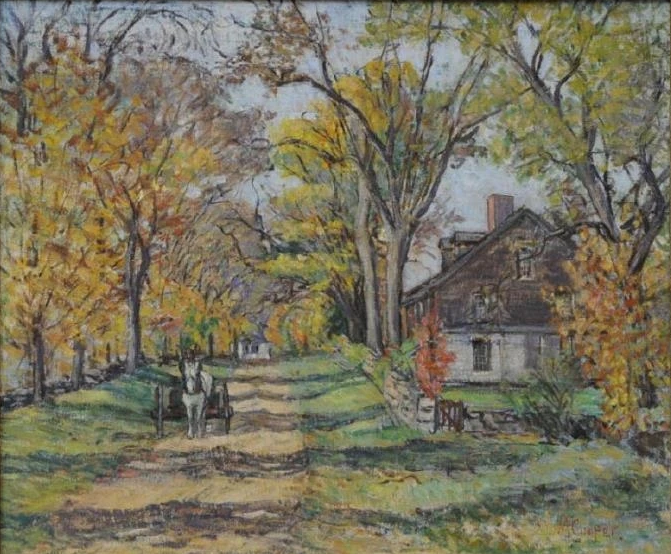
Margaret Miller Cooper, 1931, Boxwood Garden, oil on canvas, 25 x 30 inches

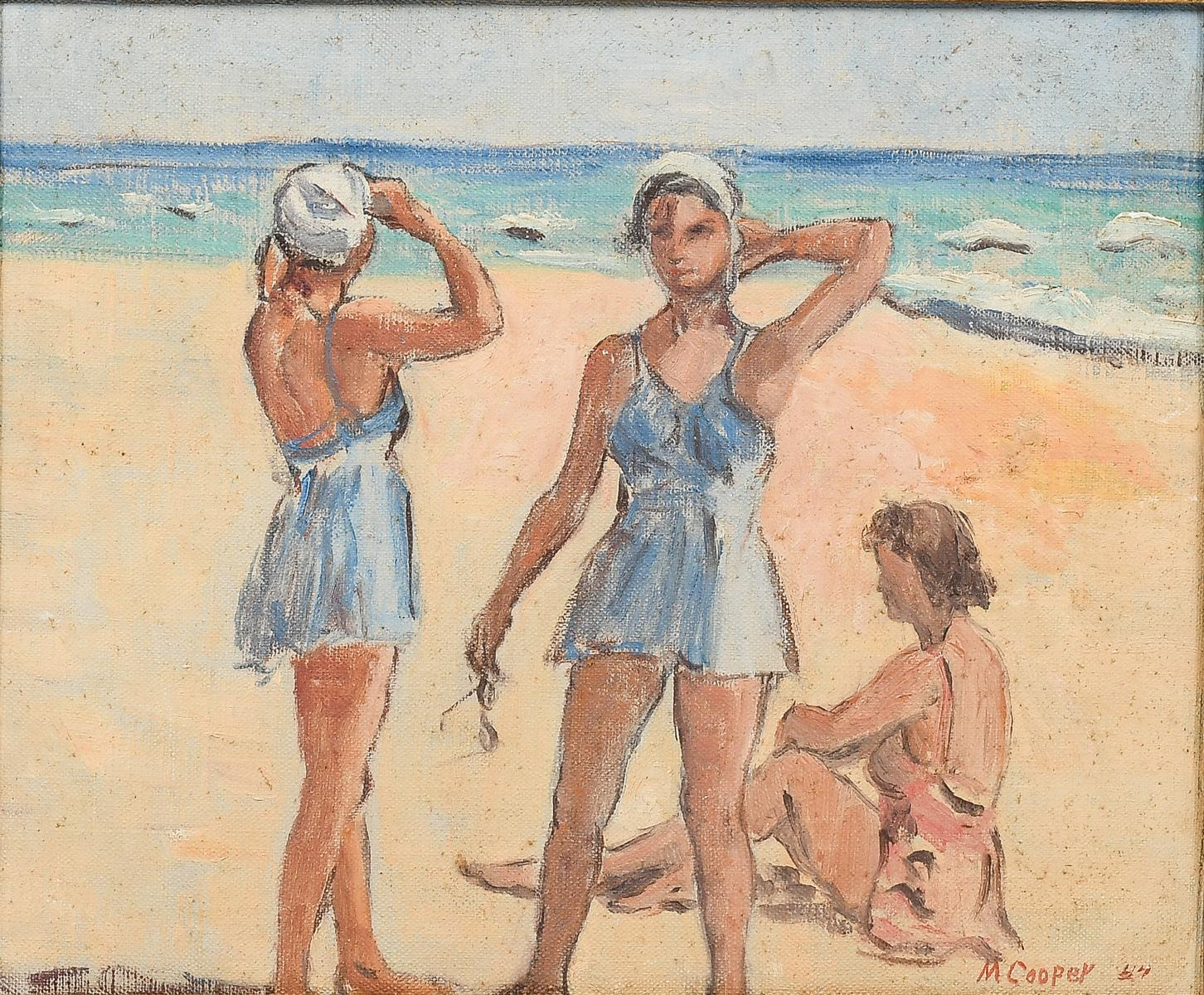
Margaret Miller Cooper, about 1944, Florida Beach Scene, oil on canvas, 10 x 12 inches

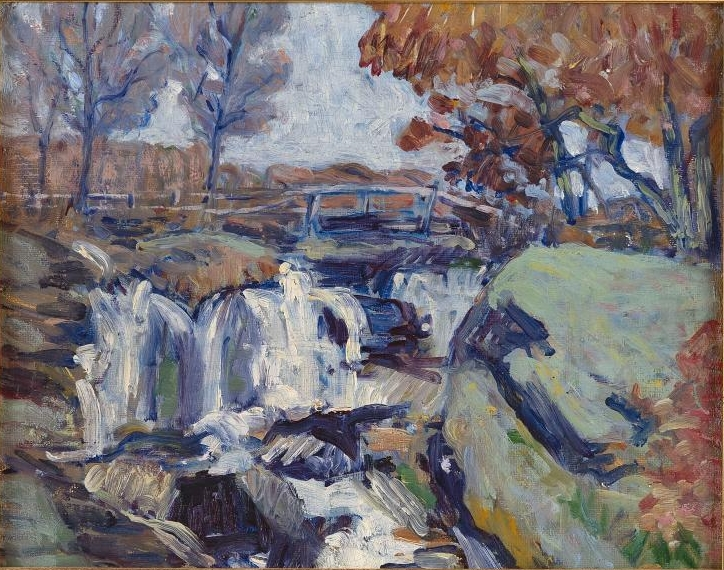
Margaret Miller Cooper, undated, Devil's Hop Yard, oil on canvas board, 11 x 14 inches

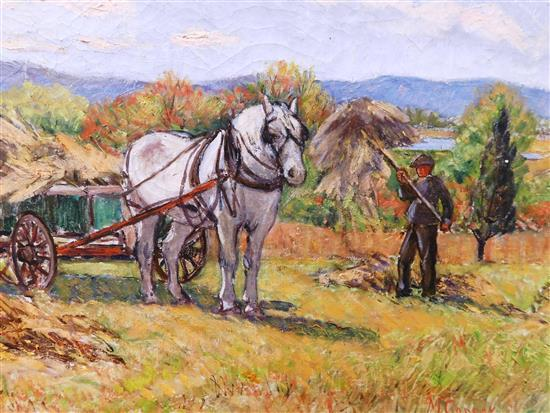
Margaret Miller Cooper, undated, Haying in the Field, oil on canvas, 16 x 20 inches

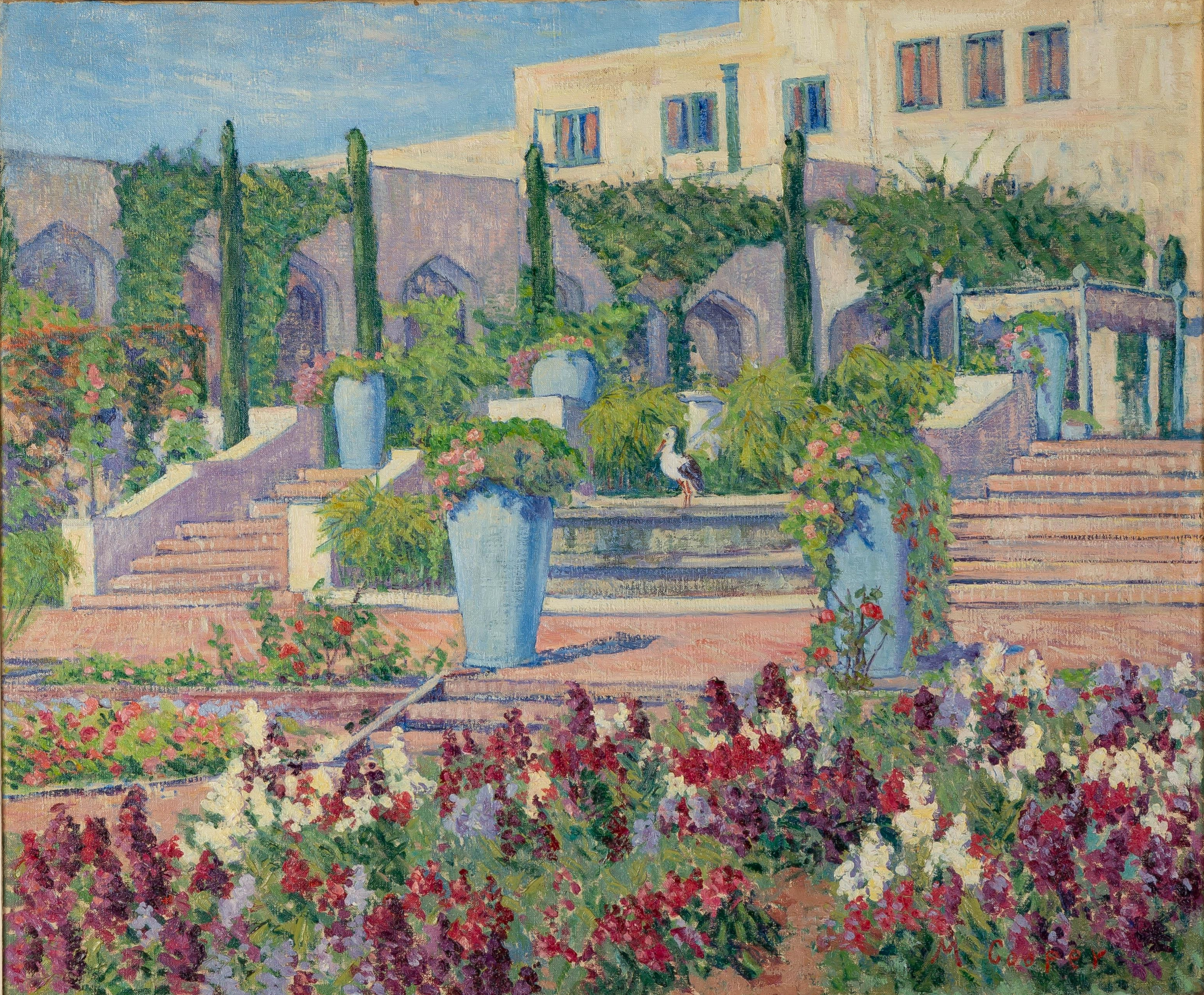
Margaret Miller Cooper, undated, Samarkand Garden, oil on canvas, 25 1/2 x 30 inches

Throughout her career, Cooper participated in group exhibitions held by museums and art associations. These included the Corcoran Gallery of Art, National Academy of Design, Art Institute of Chicago, Wadsworth Atheneum, Connecticut Academy of the Fine Arts, Lyme Art Association, New Haven Paint and Clay Club, Pennsylvania Academy of the Fine Arts, and the National Association of Women Painters and Sculptors. In 2001, the New Britain Museum of American Art included her paintings in a posthumous exhibition called "Women Artists of New Britain".

Mid-career, Cooper was given solo exhibitions at the Argent Gallery (1936), Milch Gallery (1938), and the Studio Guild (1940), all of them Manhattan galleries. She was given a late-career solo at the Cayuga Museum, Auburn, New York in 1963.

Cooper was a member of art associations, including the National Association of Women Painters and Sculptors, the Connecticut Academy of Fine Arts, the New Haven Paint and Clay Club, the Lyme Art Association, Allied Artists, and the Palm Beach League of Artists.

Cooper's legal name was Margaret Miller Cooper. She used Margaret Cooper as her professional name.

=== Artistic style and critical reception ===
Many of Cooper's landscapes depicted scenes she knew from her long association with the Connecticut countryside. She painted the old houses, farms and farm animals, and ancient trees of that place with, as one critic put it, the loving and pensive sympathy of long association." Critics said the tone of these paintings was "hospitable and gay" and described them as "cheerful depictions of inhabited places". Regarding her technique, a critic commented that she employed a warm palette in a somewhat French approach.

During winter vacations in places like Florida and the Caribbean, she chose the sea and sky as her subjects and more often included figures than in her Connecticut work. In those locations, she often employed brilliant colors in her work. Other subjects included Hawaii and Nova Scotia.

Critics saw her work as a whole as "conscientious, straightforward", "unpretentious and livable and "honest direct statements of what she sees."

== Personal life and family ==
Cooper was the daughter of Nathan Gladwin Miller and Celia Stanley Miller. A financier, Nathan Cooper made a fortune as owner of a steamboat company, a railroad, and the Eagle Lock Company., Celia Miller was a homemaker.

In 1901 Cooper married a man named Elisha Hilliard Cooper who ran a company that manufactured ball bearings. They had three sons, Stanley M., Ford H., and Richard F. Cooper.
