= Gertrude Nason =

American painter

Gertrude Nason (1890–1969) was an American painter and printmaker.

Born in Everett, Massachusetts, Nason studied in Boston at the Massachusetts College of Art under Joseph DeCamp and at the School of the Museum of Fine Arts under Edmund Charles Tarbell. Her brother was the engraver Thomas Nason, and she was married to the artist William Donahue, with whom she lived in Greenwich Village and had a summer residence in Lyme, Connecticut. She exhibited widely, and won numerous honors and awards. During her career she was a member of the Brooklyn Society of Modern Art, the Creative Arts Association, Lyme Art Association, the National Association of Women Artists, and the New York Society of Women Artists. She also worked for a time as the supervisor of art for a school district in Boston.
