= Elisabeth Gordon Chandler =

American sculptor

Elisabeth Gordon Chandler (June 10, 1913 – November 29, 2006) was an American sculptor and educator, and the founder of the Lyme Academy of Fine Arts.

== Life and work ==
Elisabeth Gordon Chandler was born in St. Louis, Missouri, initially trained as a harpist, and was performing professionally by the age of eighteen. However, as a young woman she decided to pursue a career in the visual arts, and in New York City studied sculpture with Edmondo Quattocchi, and anatomy with Robert Beverly Hale at the Art Students League of New York.

Chandler received a number of honors; her first award came in 1945, when her bronze figure Victory won first prize in the Brooklyn War Memorial competition. Subsequently, she garnered awards from the National Academy of Design and the National Sculpture Society, and was the recipient of the Governor's Art Award, State of Connecticut, and an Honorary Doctorate from St. Joseph's College, West Hartford, Connecticut. Her sculpture has been housed in St. Patrick's Cathedral in New York City, the British Museum in London, Columbia University School of Law, and Princeton University. Chandler excelled especially in portraiture, and produced busts which were definitive images of such notables as Nobelist Albert A. Michelson, United States Secretary of Defense James Forrestal, Supreme Court Chief Justices John Jay, Charles Evans Hughes and Harlan Fiske Stone, actor Charles Coburn, artists James Montgomery Flagg and Alphaeus Philemon Cole, and Adlai Stevenson.

In 1962 Chandler moved from New York City to Old Lyme, Connecticut. In 1976 she founded the Lyme Academy of Fine Arts in order to provide students with an education in traditional, representational art. In addition to being the school's founder, she served as a professor of sculpture and trustee of the college until her death. In 1973, she was elected into the National Academy of Design as an Associate member, and became a full member in 1979.

Chandler was twice married and widowed, first to Robert Kirtland Chandler, and later to fellow sculptor Laci de Gerenday. Professionally she took the name of her first husband, but socially she was known as Elisabeth de Gerenday. Her memory is honored by a preserve in Old Lyme, which is known in part by the latter name.
