= Joseph DeCamp =

American painter (1858–1923)

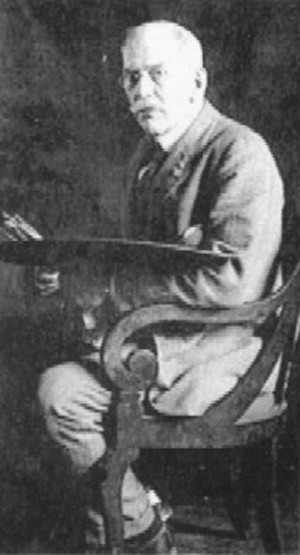
- Joseph Rodefer DeCamp
- Born: November 5, 1858; Cincinnati, Ohio
- Died: February 11, 1923 (aged 64); Boca Grande, Florida
- Known for: Portraits, landscapes
- Movement: Tonalism

Joseph Rodefer DeCamp (November 5, 1858 – February 11, 1923) was an American painter and educator.

== Biography ==
Born in Cincinnati, Ohio, where he studied with Frank Duveneck. In the second half of the 1870s he went with Duveneck and fellow students to the Royal Academy of Munich. He then spent time in Florence, Italy, returning to Boston in 1883.

DeCamp became known as a member of the Boston School led by Edmund C. Tarbell and Emil Otto Grundmann, focusing on figure painting, and in the 1890s adopting the style of Tonalism. At the age of 12, he began to draw crayon interpretations of published drawings. He was a founder of the Ten American Painters, a group of American Impressionists, in 1897. Following Thomas Hovenden's sudden death in 1895, DeCamp was hired to teach at the Pennsylvania Academy of the Fine Arts in Philadelphia, Pennsylvania, but resigned after one year because of ill health. From 1903 until his death in 1923, he was a faculty member at Massachusetts Normal Art School, now Massachusetts College of Art and Design, teaching painting from the living model and portraiture. He also taught painting classes at the School of the Museum of Fine Arts in Boston. Among his pupils was Gertrude Nason.

In 1891, he married Edith Franklin Baker (1868–1955). They had four children: Sarah "Sally" (1892–1973), Theodore "Ted" (1894–1955), Lydia (1896–1974), and Pauline (1899–). Family members served as models for a number of his paintings.

A 1904 fire in his Boston studio destroyed several hundred of his early paintings, including nearly all of his landscapes.

He died in 1923 in Boca Grande, Florida.

== Honors ==
He was awarded the 1899 Temple Gold Medal (for Woman Drying Her Hair), the 1912 Beck Gold Medal (for Portrait of Francis I. Amory), and the 1920 Lippincott Prize (for The Red Kimono) by the Pennsylvania Academy of the Fine Arts. He received an honorable mention at the 1900 Exposition Universelle in Paris (for Woman Drying Her Hair). His exhibit at the 1904 St. Louis World's Fair — Reading – The Sea Wall – Portrait of Arthur P. DeCamp — was awarded a gold medal. He was awarded the 1909 Clarke Silver Medal by the Corcoran Gallery of Art (for The Guitar Player). He was awarded the 1915 gold medal by the Philadelphia Art Club (for The Silver Waist).

In 1902, he was elected into the National Academy of Design as an Associate Academician.

== Selected works ==
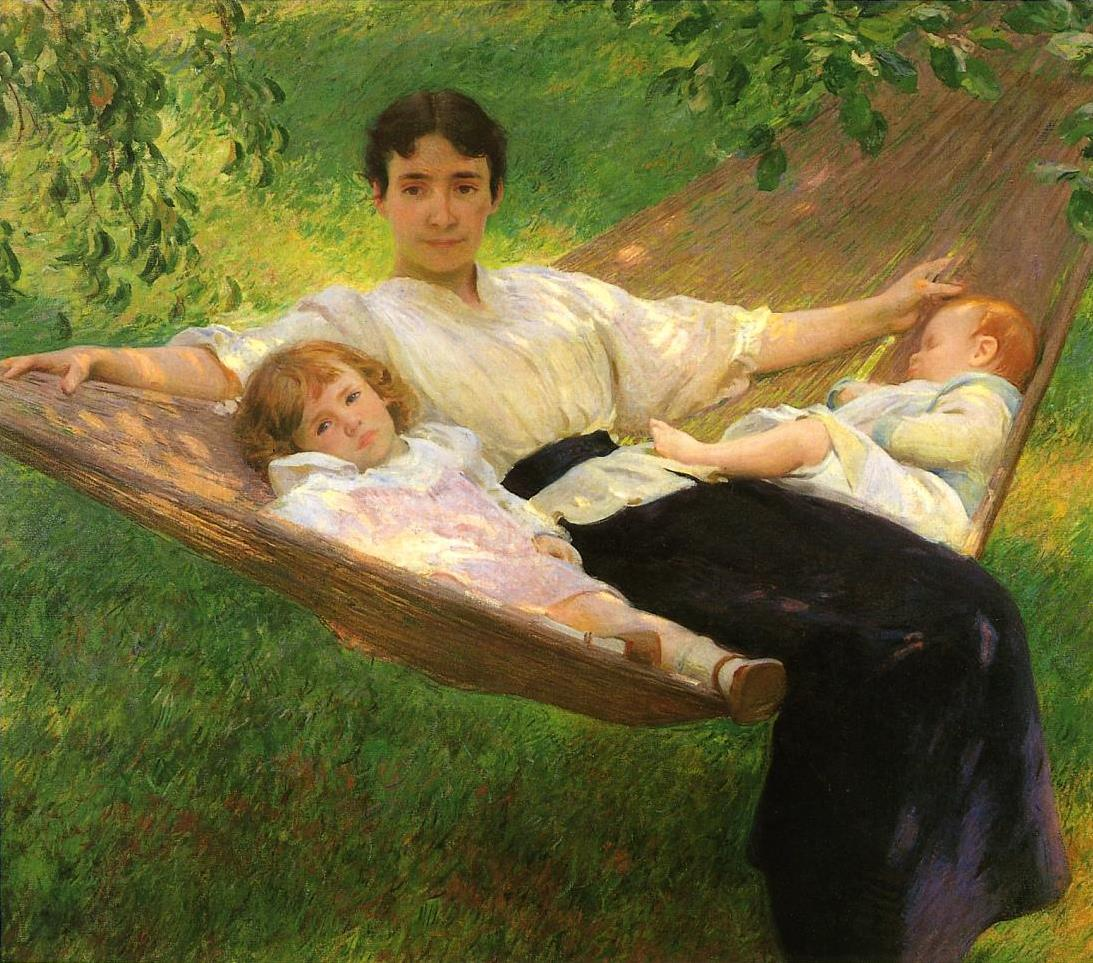
The Hammock (ca. 1895), Terra Foundation for American Art. The artist's wife Edith, daughter Sally, and infant son Ted.

- The Hammock - Portrait of the Artist's Wife and Children (ca. 1895), Terra Foundation for American Art, Chicago, Illinois.
- Woman Drying Her Hair (ca. 1899), Cincinnati Art Museum.
- Arthur P. DeCamp - Portrait of the Artist's Brother (ca. 1900), Longyear Historical Society & Museum, Chestnut Hill, Massachusetts.
- Farewell (ca. 1900-02), private collection. Set an auction record for a work by DeCamp – Christie's NY, 5 December 2013, $821,000.
- Portrait of Dr. Horace Howard Furness (1906), Pennsylvania Academy of the Fine Arts, Philadelphia.
- Sally - Portrait of the Artist's Daughter (1907), Worcester Art Museum, Worcester, Massachusetts.
- Portrait of President Theodore Roosevelt (1908), Memorial Hall, Harvard University, Cambridge, Massachusetts.
- The Cellist (1908), Cincinnati Art Museum.
- The Guitar Player (1908), Museum of Fine Arts, Boston.
- Portrait of Francis I. Amory (1909), private collection.
- Three Friends - Portrait of Isaac H. Clothier, His Son and Grandson (1912), private collection. The title has a double meaning, the Clothiers were Quakers, members of the Society of Friends.
- The Seamstress (1916), Corcoran Gallery of Art, Washington, D.C.
- The Steward - Portrait of George Washington Lewis (1919), Porcellian Club, Harvard University, Cambridge, Massachusetts. Lewis was steward of the Harvard final club for more than 45 years.
- Portrait of Edward Tuck (1919), Hood Museum of Art, Dartmouth College, Hanover, New Hampshire.
- The Red Kimono (1920), Cummer Museum of Art and Gardens, Jacksonville, Florida.
- The Blue Mandarin Coat (1922), High Museum of Art, Atlanta, Georgia. DeCamp's final painting.

== Gallery ==
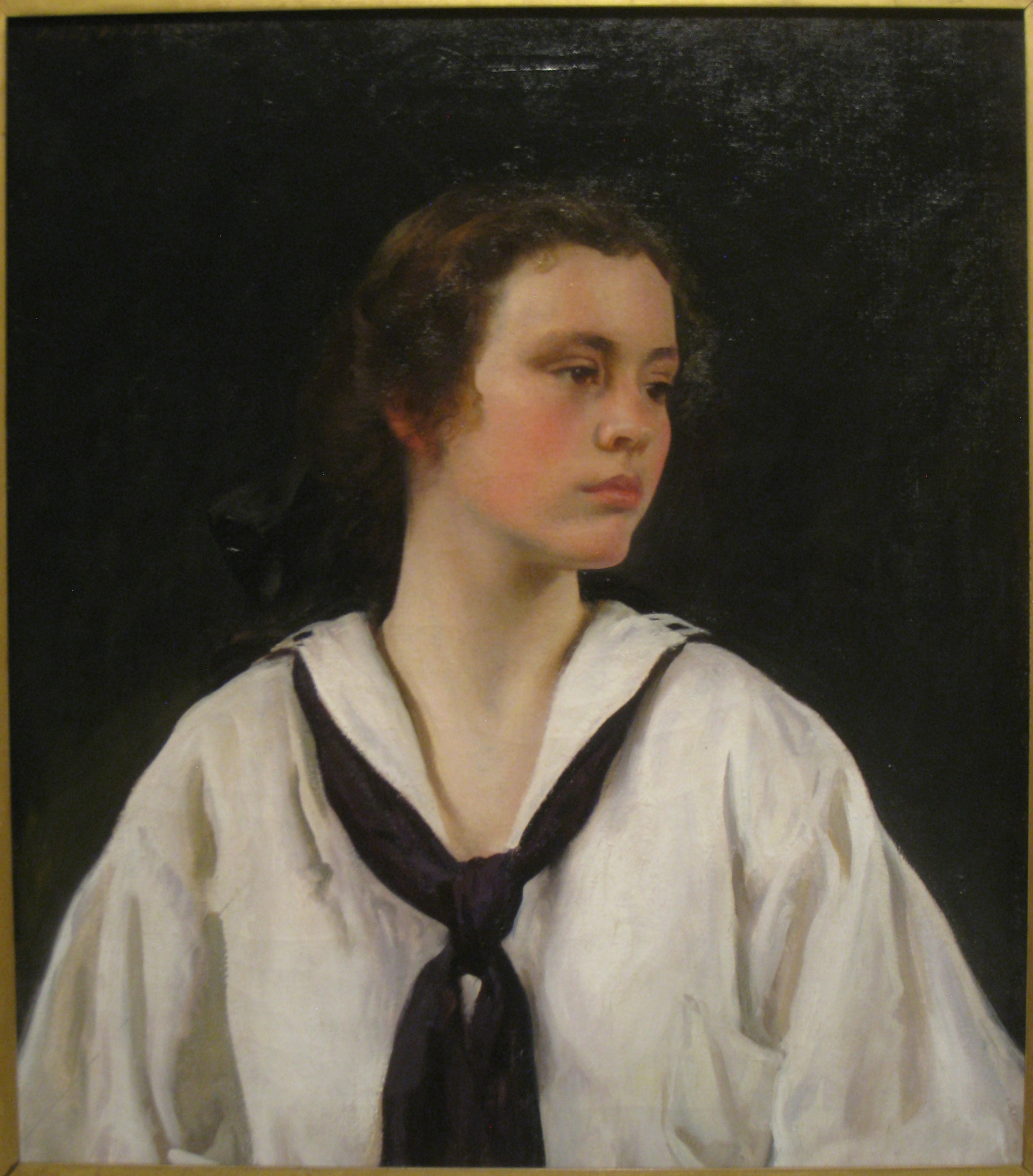
Sally (1907), Worcester Art Museum, Worcester, Massachusetts.

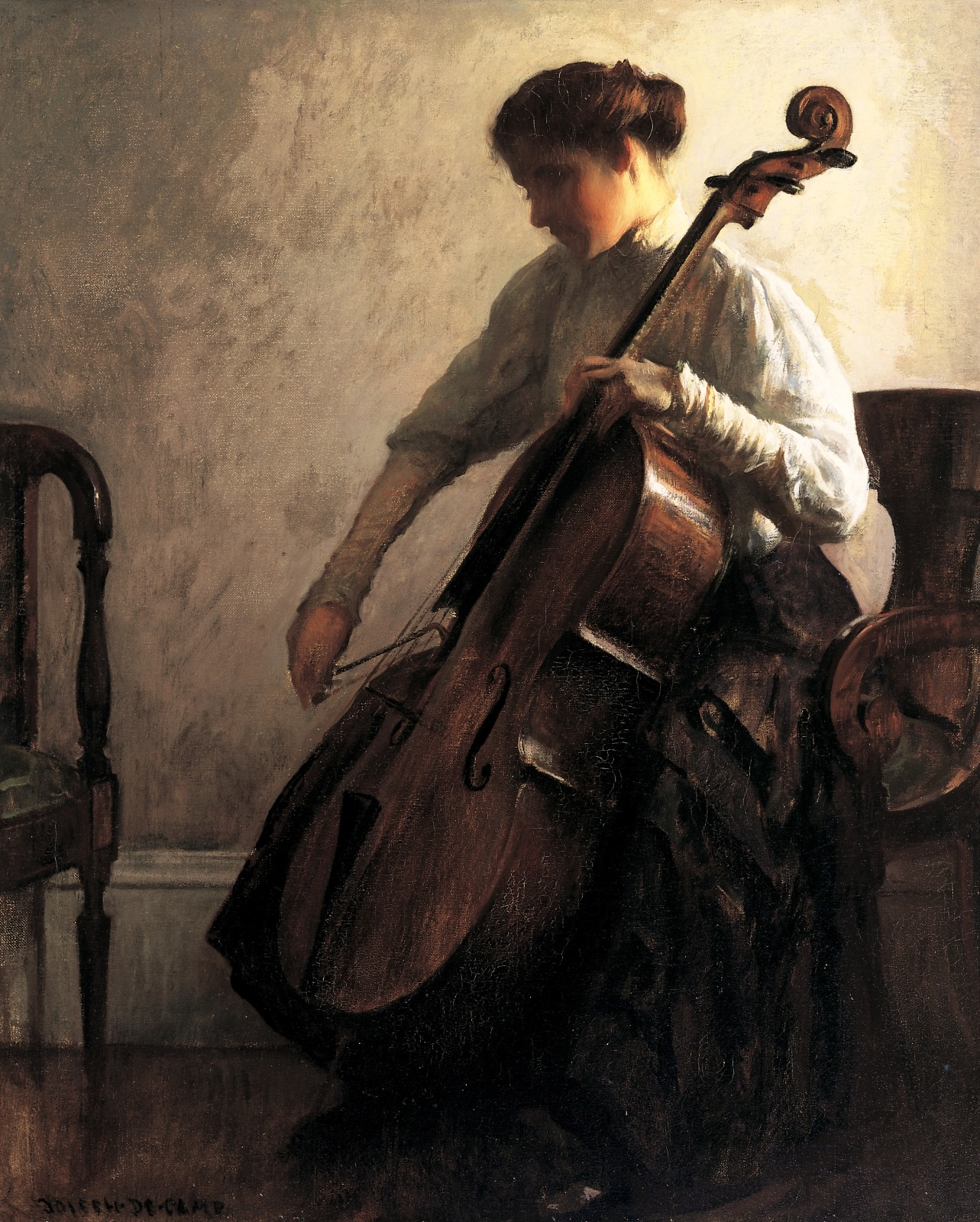
The Cellist (1908), Cincinnati Art Museum.

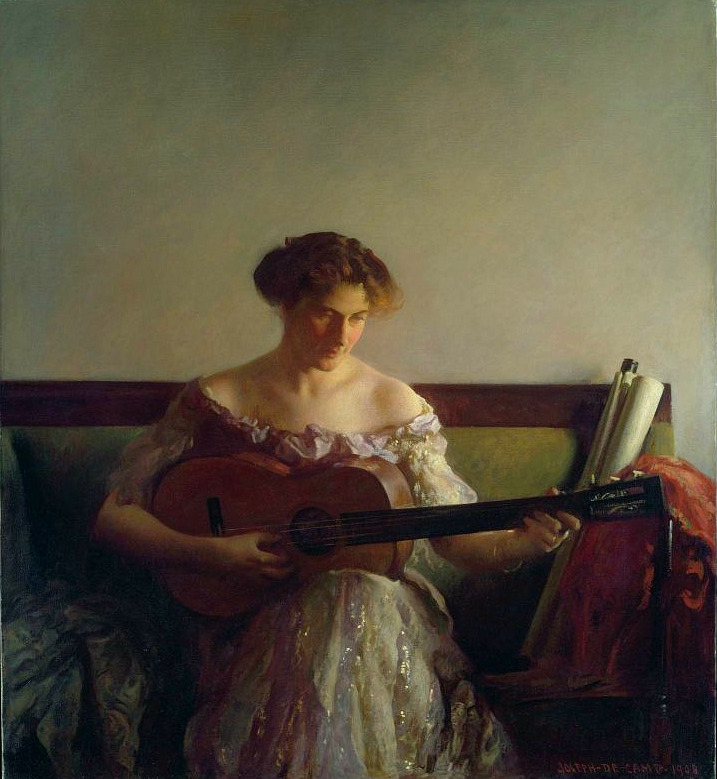
The Guitar Player (1908), Museum of Fine Arts, Boston.

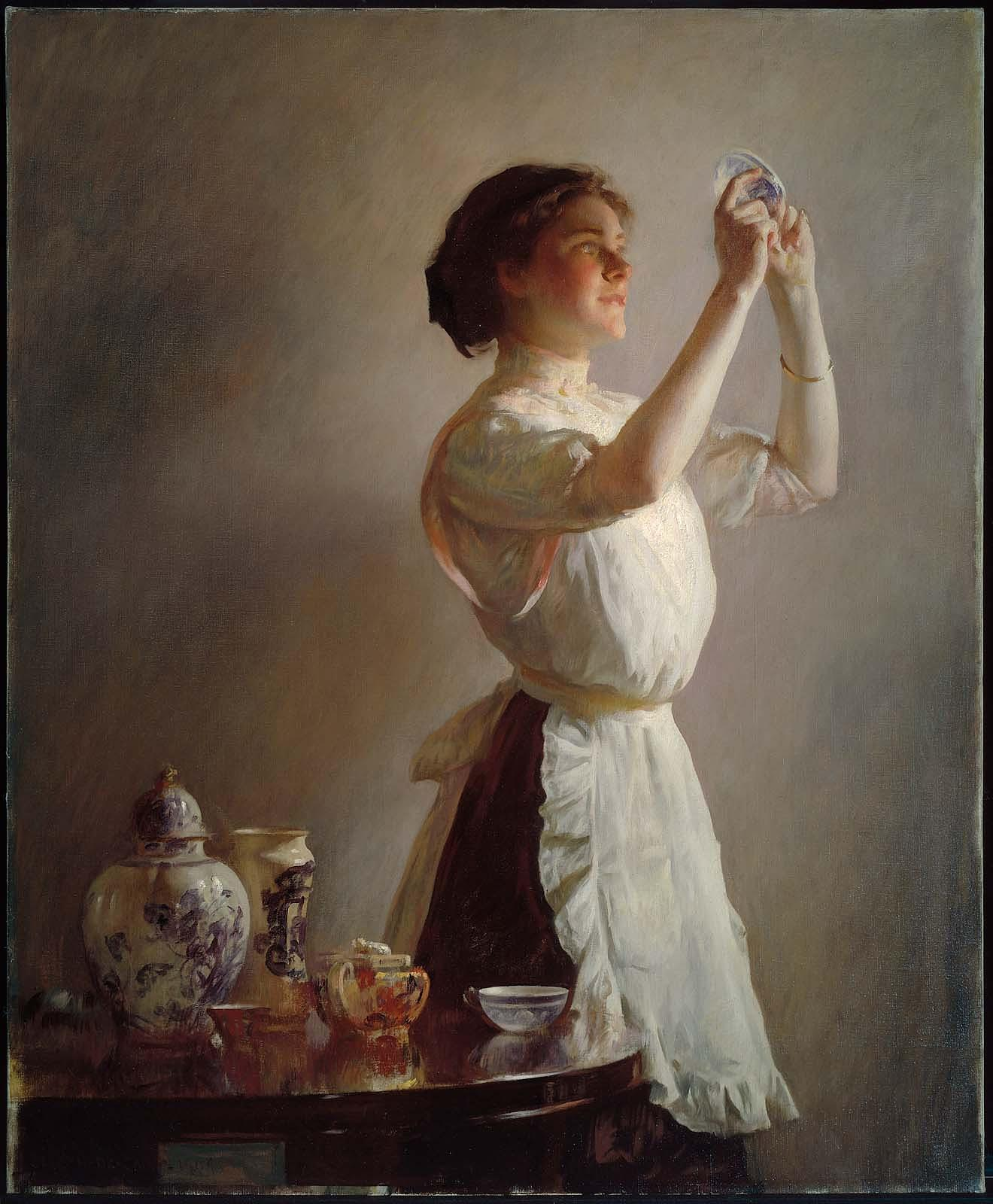
The Blue Cup (1909), Museum of Fine Arts, Boston.

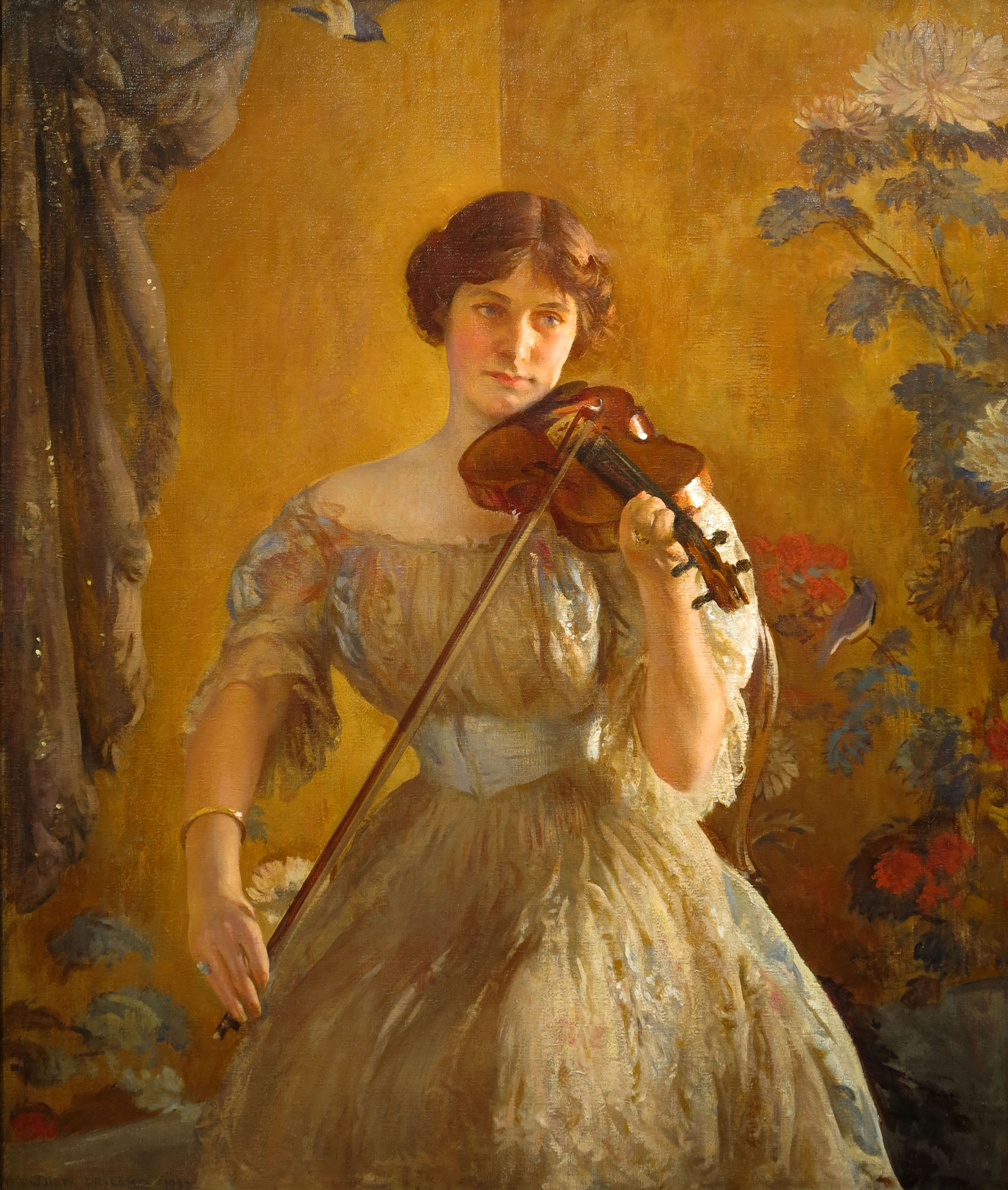
The Kreutzer Sonata (1912), private collection.

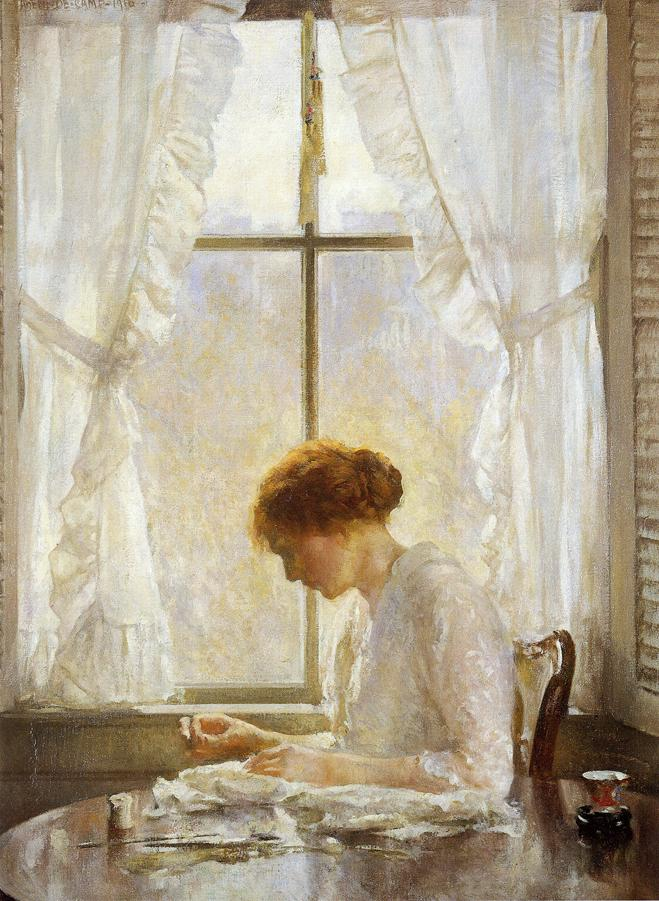
The Seamstress (1916), Corcoran Gallery of Art, Washington, D.C.

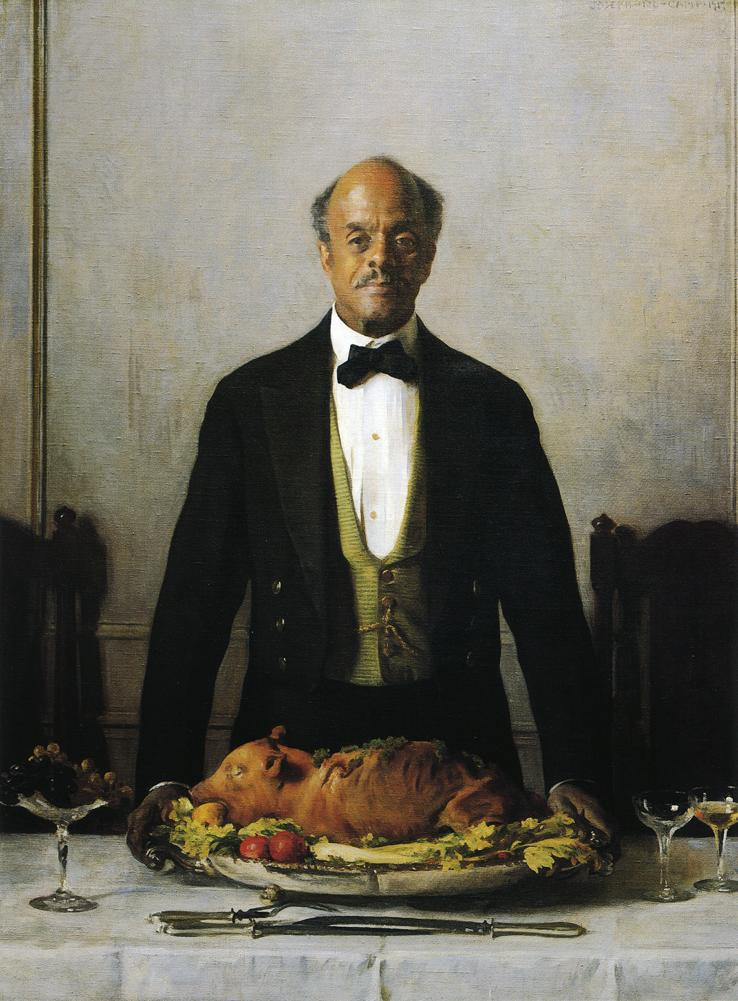
The Steward (1919), Porcellian Club, Harvard University.

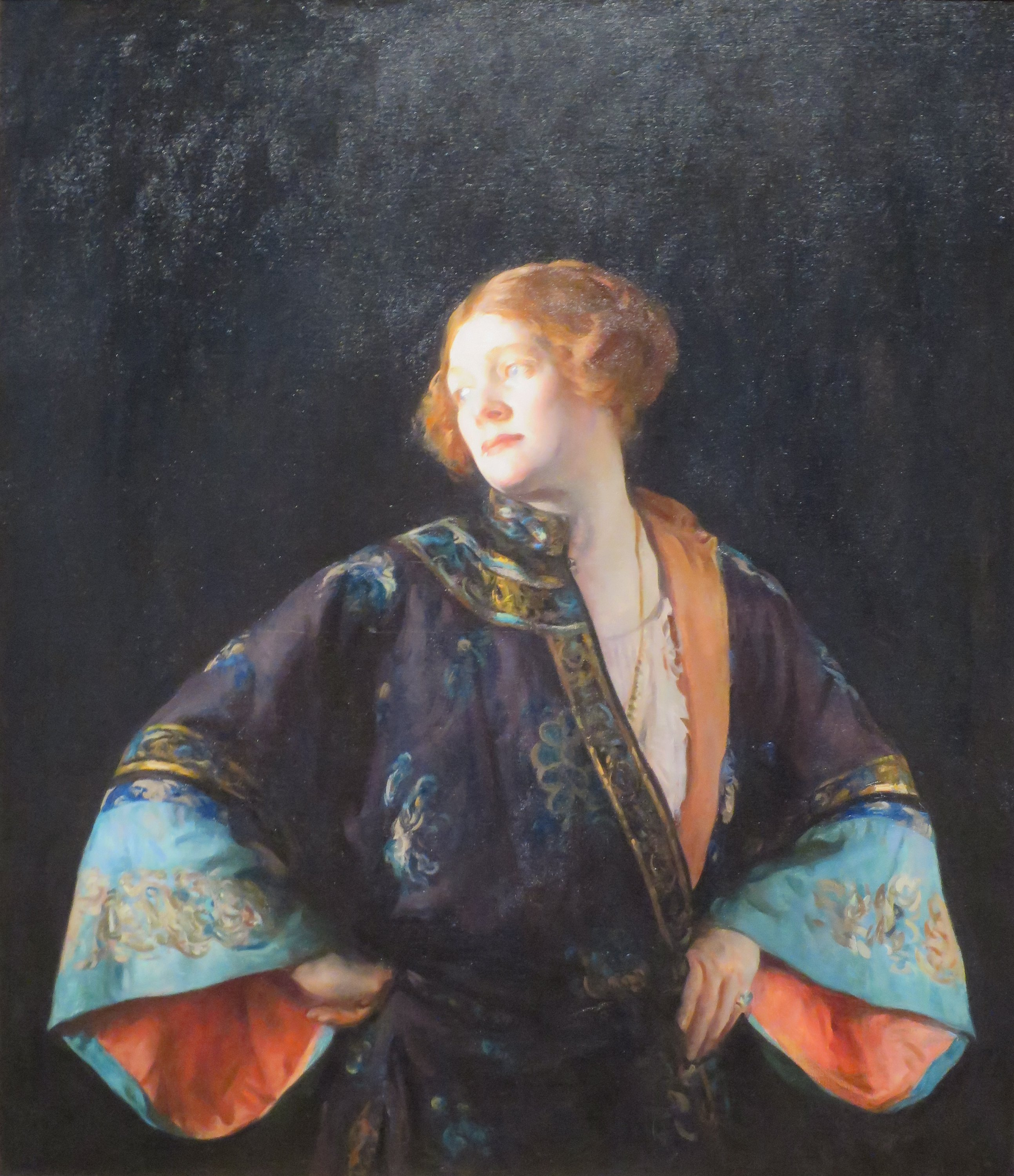
The Blue Mandarin Coat (1922), High Museum of Art, Atlanta, Georgia.

== Sources ==
- Laurene Buckley, Joseph DeCamp: The Boston Technician (Prestel Publishing, 1995) ISBN 3-7913-1604-4
- William Howe Downes, "Joseph De Camp and His Work," Art and Progress Magazine, vol. 4, no. 6 (April 1913), pp. 919–25.
