= Lyme Academy of Fine Arts =

Art school in Old Lyme, Connecticut

The Lyme Academy of Fine Arts
- Type: Private Art School
- Established: 1976
- Faculty: Jordan Sokol & Amaya Gurpide, Artistic Directors
- Students: 35 full-time (Winter 2024)
- Location: Old Lyme, Connecticut, U.S.
- Campus: 4 acres (1.6 ha)
- Nickname: Lyme Academy
- Website: www.lymeacademy.edu

The Lyme Academy of Fine Arts is an art school in Old Lyme, Connecticut.

== History ==
The Lyme Academy was founded in 1976 by Elisabeth Gordon Chandler as a figurative academy for the teaching of sculpture, figure drawing, Illustration and painting dedicated to the fine arts. The school offered a Bachelor of Fine Arts degree in the disciplines of painting, sculpture, illustration and drawing, as well as post-baccalaureate and a three-year certificate programs.

=== 1992-2019 ===
BFA degrees were first awarded in 1992, and between 2014 and 2019 the academy was affiliated with the University of New Haven. Under that agreement, Lyme kept ownership of the campus and its own Board of Trustees; New Haven acquired the academic degree programs. The business plan underlying that cooperation was that 200 students would enroll at the academy, a goal that was never reached; according the Michael Thomas Duffy, chair of the academy's board in 2021, the academy enrolled about 120 students at most. In 2019, "the University of New Haven discontinued degree-granting academic offerings". New Haven president Steven H. Kaplan said that at the time the affiliation with Lyme Academy would add a fine arts degree to the university, but the academy struggled to get enrollment figures up (with 139 students for the fall of 2017, and 122 in August 2018)

=== Since 2019 ===
After a few difficult years, the academy hired new staff and a new artistic director Jordan Sokol, and saw about 120 students enroll for the summer term of 2021. At the time it had a budget of $1.657 million. The board planned to return to the earlier goals of the academy and adopted a manifesto for its reboot, including "adhering to the philosophy of Chandler, who believed artists needed to learn the fundamentals of figurative art ... in small classes with a high teacher to student ratio." They hoped to enroll 10 full-time students in the fall of 2021, and possibly 15 in the spring of 2022. Tuition for full-time core students was set at $9,600 per year. In addition, the academy planned to offer perhaps two dozen workshops annually, as well as four weekly part-time classes.
