= Matilda Browne =

American painter

Matilta Browne
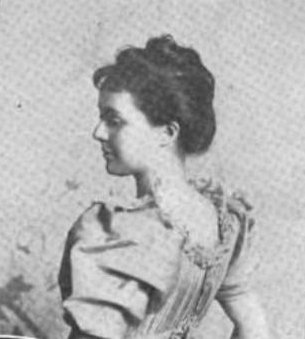
- Matilda Browne 1894 age 25
- Born: May 8, 1869; Newark, New Jersey
- Died: November 3, 1947 (aged 78); Greenwich, Connecticut
- Known for: Painting
- Movement: Impressionism
- Spouse: Frederick Van Wyck
- Awards: Dodge Prize; 1889

Matilda Browne (May 8, 1869 – November 3, 1947) was an American Impressionist artist noted for her flower paintings and her farm and cattle scenes. Born in Newark, New Jersey, she was a child prodigy who received early art training from her artist-neighbor, Thomas Moran.

Matilda Browne was active in Greenwich, Connecticut, New York City, and Old Lyme, Connecticut, where she was affiliated with the art colony centered at the Florence Griswold home. She was the only woman at the Old Lyme Colony who was taken seriously as a painter by her male colleagues, and she was considered an important member of the Old Lyme group.

== Biography ==
As a child in Newark, New Jersey, Browne lived next door to the artist Thomas Moran famous for his landscapes and particularly for his large paintings of Yellowstone National Park. He allowed his 9-year old neighbor into his studio to watch him work before inviting her to experiment with paint, brushes and canvas on her own. Her natural talent was obvious. He encouraged her to take additional art lessons, and by age 12 one of her paintings of flowers was accepted into an exhibition at the National Academy of Design in New York.

She soon became interested in painting farm animals and traveled with her mother to Europe in 1889 to study with animal painters in France and the Netherlands. Browne studied under a series of accomplished tutors — Eleanor and Kate Greatorex (1854–1917, 1851–1913), Frederick Freer (1849–1908), Charles Melville Dewey (1849–1937), Julien Dupré (1851–1910) in Barbizon, and Henry Bisbing (1849–1933) in the Netherlands.

After returning from Europe in the early 1890s, Browne returned to New York and began to exhibit in the metropolitan area. Most significantly, given her fondness for animal painting, she studied with Carleton Wiggins (1848–1932), a well known landscape and cattle painter. Browne exhibited An Unwilling Model (c.1892) at the Palace of Fine Arts at the 1893 World's Columbian Exposition in Chicago, Illinois.

She worked in Greenwich, Connecticut, working at Cos Cob, Connecticut, in the late 1890s, and on and off throughout her career; she worked in Old Lyme, Connecticut, from 1905 to 1906 and periodically from 1911 to 1924. Wiggins may have introduced her to the Florence Griswold boardinghouse in Old Lyme. Browne later rented a house on Lyme Street in the center of the village, believed to be shown in the background of In the Garden (1915).

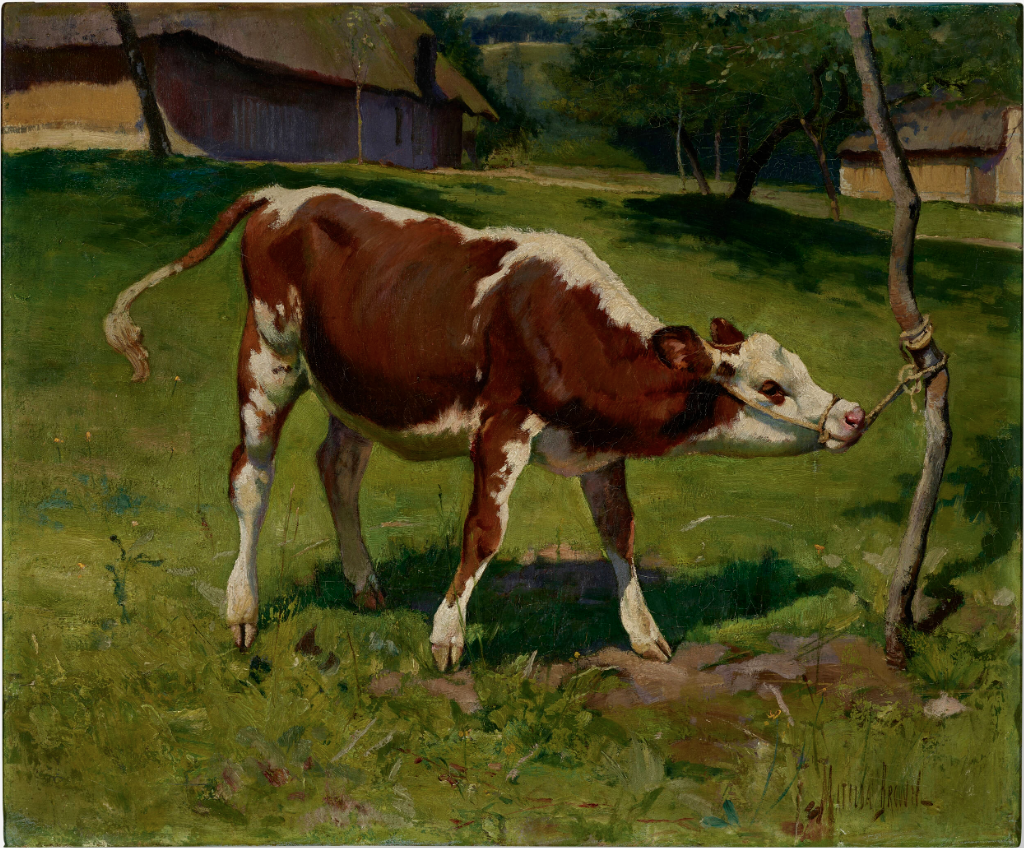
An Unwilling Model, c.1892

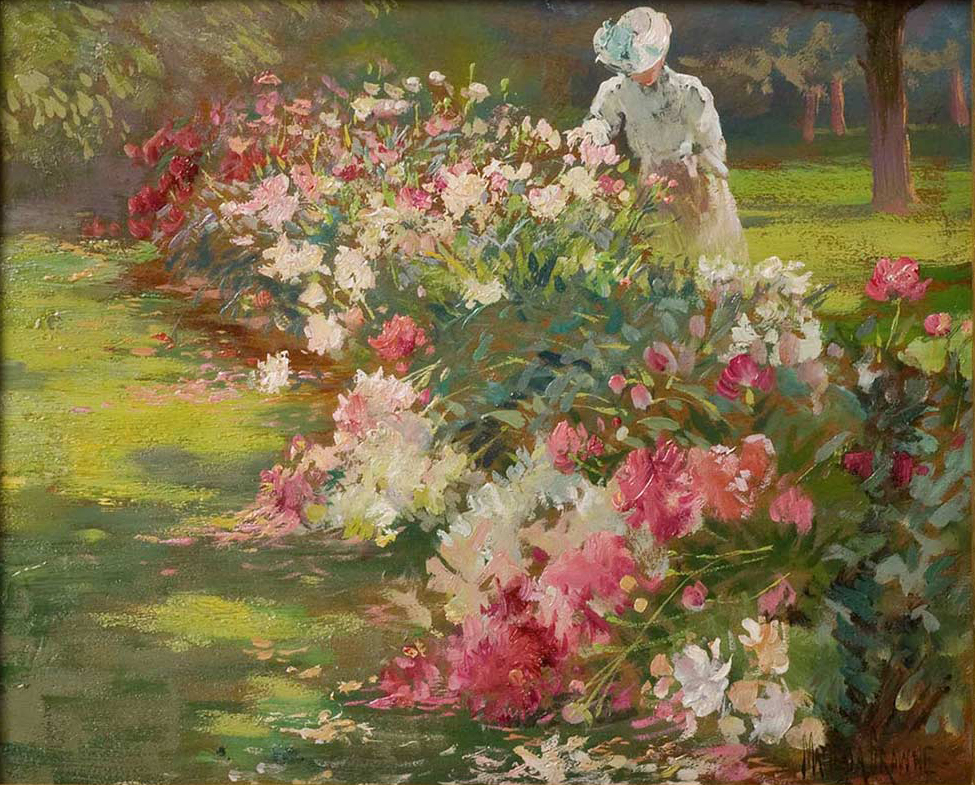
Peonies, 1907

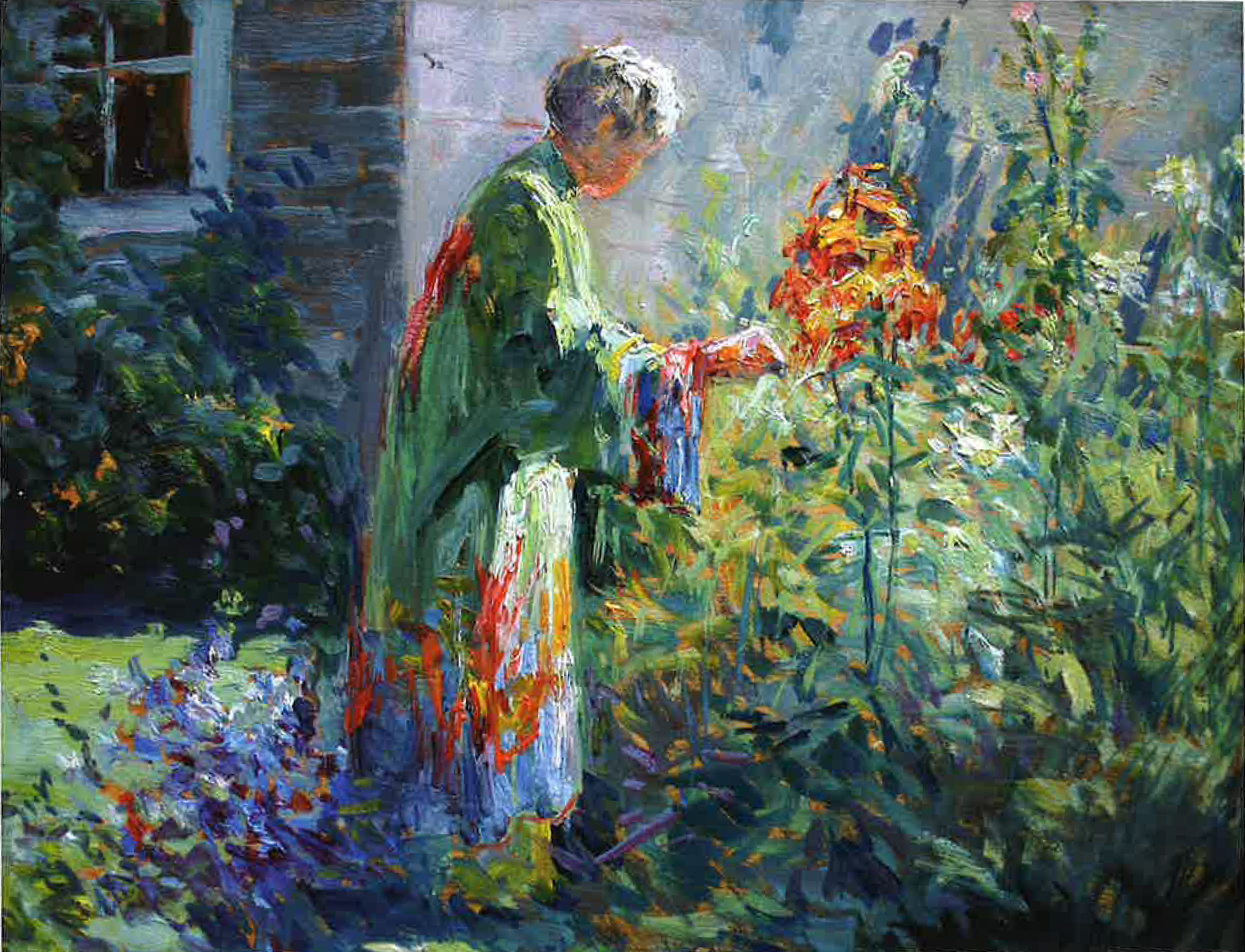
In the Garden, 1915

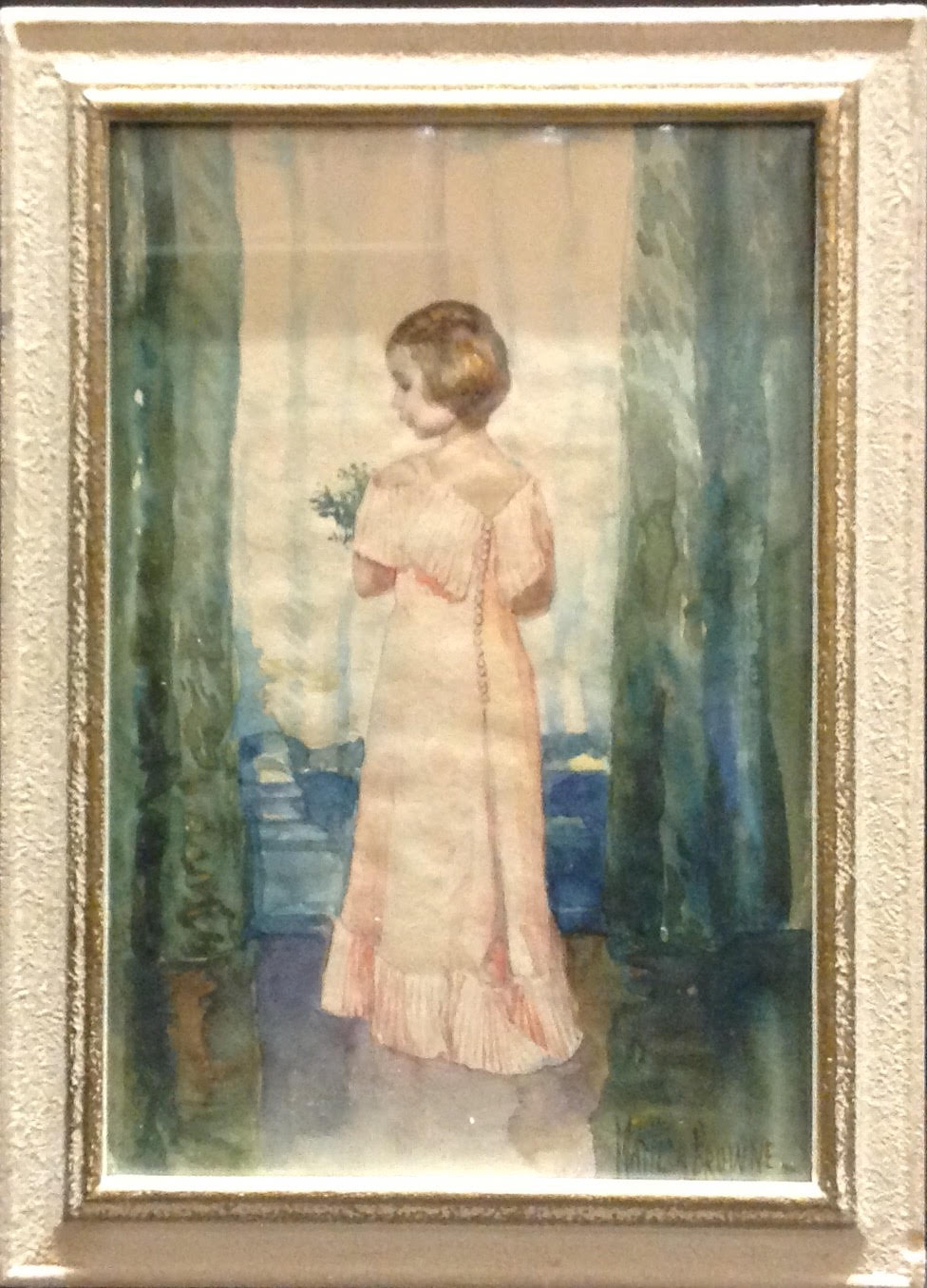
Young girl in pink party gown, n.d.

In 1905, when she first visited Old Lyme at the age of 36, she had already won a number of awards and established a critical reputation. The other artists at the Griswold boardinghouse asked Matilda Browne to paint on a door and she contributed a pair of panels on the door leading to Miss Florence's bedroom titled Bucolic Landscape, forming a scene of calves grazing beneath a tree. She was also the only woman to be included in The Fox Chase mural about the art colony that Henry Rankin Poore was painting over the dining room fireplace. These were extraordinary honors, since this all-male colony generally looked down on female artists – as most obviously illustrated by Willard Metcalf who painted one young woman art student unsympathetically as Poor Little Bloticelli (1907).

In 1918 Matilda Browne became the second wife of Frederick Van Wyck. She and her husband lived at his home on 142 E. 18th St, Manhattan, New York. In 1932 her illustrations were published in her husband's book, Recollections of an Old New Yorker.

After Frederick Van Wyck's death on February 16, 1936, Matilda Browne returned to Greenwich to live. Matilda Browne died in Greenwich, Connecticut, on November 3, 1947, at the age of 78.

== Awards ==
- Dodge Prize (National Academy of Design, 1889)
- Third Hallgarten Prize (National Academy of Design, 1901)
- Connecticut Academy of Fine Arts Award (1918, 1919)
- Greenwich Art Association (prize, 1929)
