= Alphaeus Philemon Cole =

American artist, engraver and etcher (1876–1988)

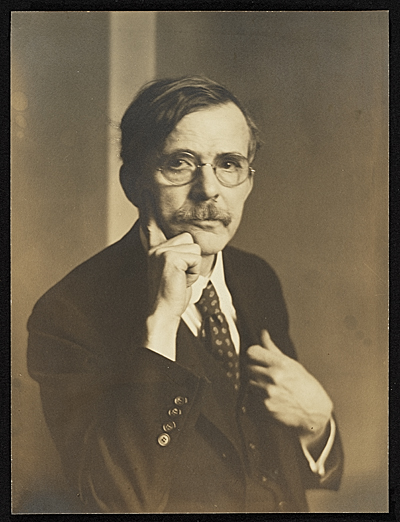
- Cole in 1920
- Born: July 12, 1876; Jersey City, New Jersey, U.S.
- Died: November 25, 1988 (aged 112 years, 136 days); New York City, U.S.
- Occupations: Artist; engraver; etcher
- Known for: Portraits; etchings; still life paintings; world's oldest living man

Alphaeus Philemon Cole (July 12, 1876 – November 25, 1988) was an American artist, engraver, etcher and supercentenarian. He was born in Jersey City, New Jersey, the son of noted wood-engraver Timothy Cole. Until his death, at age 112 years and 136 days, Alphaeus had been the world's oldest verified living man and the oldest living person in the United States.

== Biography ==
Cole studied art first under Isaac Craig in Italy, then in Paris from 1892 to 1901 with Jean Paul Laurens and Jean-Joseph Benjamin-Constant at the Académie Julian, and later at the École des Beaux-Arts. In the mid-1890s, he began to produce many vibrant works, mostly various still lifes and portraits. His painting of Dante was exhibited in the 1900 Paris Salon, and more artwork was displayed at the 1901 Pan-American Exposition in Buffalo, New York.

Cole moved to England and married sculptor Margaret Ward Walmsley in 1903. He began to venture into the fields of wood/steel engraving and etching, but these works sold less than his portraits. He contributed several drawings to the Encyclopædia Britannica. They moved again, to the United States, in 1911. In 1918, Cole became a member of the Salmagundi Club, the nation's oldest professional art club. From 1924 to 1931, he taught portrait and still life classes at Cooper Union. He was elected to the National Academy of Design in 1930. He was the president of the New York Water Color Club from 1931 to 1941. In the 1940s, Cole worked as a judge of paintings in Max Pochapin's Manhattan Hall of Art, a merchandising art gallery, which was a revolutionary idea at the time. From 1952 to 1953, he was president of Allied Artists of America. His first wife died in 1961, and Cole married Anita Rio (born 1873), a singer, and the widow of painter Eugene Higgins, in 1962. She died in 1971.

Cole actively painted and exhibited up to the age of 103. He died at New York's Chelsea Hotel, where he had lived for 35 years. Cole's work is in the permanent collections of London's National Portrait Gallery and the Brooklyn Museum, and his papers are stored at the Smithsonian Institution.

Cole was subsequently verified as having been the oldest living man following the death of 111-year-old Norwegian skier Herman Smith-Johannsen, on January 5, 1987. He was also the oldest living person in the United States for seven months after the death of 112-year-old Elzona Maxey on April 25, 1988.

He died in New York City, aged 112 years and 136 days.

== See also ==
- Supercentenarian
