= Henry Rankin Poore =

American painter

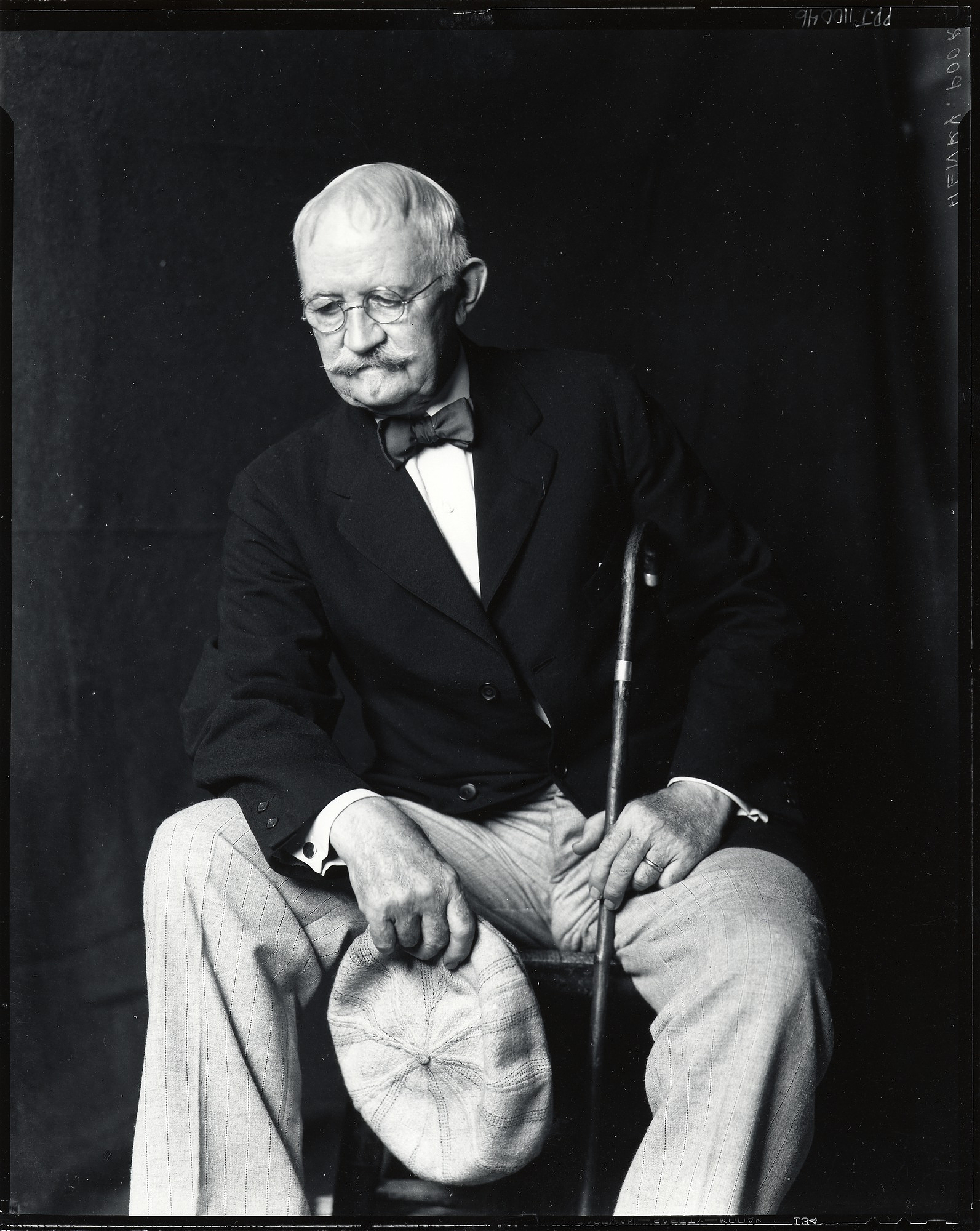
Henry Rankin Poore (c. 1934)

Henry Rankin Poore (1859–1940) was an American painter and illustrator, known for incorporating human and animal figures into his landscape and genre paintings. He was also a lecturer and critic, and a prolific author on art and composition.

== Painter and teacher ==
Poore was born on March 21, 1859, in Newark, New Jersey, to Rev. Daniel Warren Poore and Susan Helen Poore née Ellis. He spent his childhood in California and then studied at the University of Pennsylvania, graduating in 1883. That same year, The New York Times identified him as "a promising young Philadelphia painter," and wrote approvingly of his illustrations for a new edition of The Night Before Christmas.

Poore studied privately with Peter Moran in Philadelphia, at the Pennsylvania Academy of the Fine Arts under Thomas Eakins, and then at the National Academy of Design in New York City. He studied further at the Académie Julian in Paris, where his teachers included Évariste Vital Luminais and William-Adolphe Bouguereau. He exhibited The Night of the Nativity at the Salon of 1889.

Returning to the United States, he opened a studio in Philadelphia, shared with illustrator Joseph Pennell. Poore had gone on summer sketching trips to the American Southwest during college, and some of his illustrations were used in The Story of the American Indian (1887). He returned to New Mexico in 1891, sponsored by the U.S. government, to study the Pueblo Indians and report on their living conditions.

Poore made his reputation as a "Horse and Hound" painter, but his subjects ranged widely. He painted hunting scenes in England in 1893, including Queen Victoria's stag hounds at Ascot Heath. One critic wrote of a retrospective of his works: "In his long career ... he wielded a versatile brush and his exhibition reveals a catholicity of view which embraces with equal enthusiasm the hunting field, the New England farmer and the character revealed by the face before the portrait painter."

He taught at the Chautauqua Summer Art School in western New York and served as its director from 1896 to 1902. He was one of the founders of the summer artists' colony at Old Lyme, Connecticut. He lectured at the Pennsylvania Academy of the Fine Arts beginning in 1904.

=== Honors and awards ===
The National Academy of Design awarded Poore its Second Hallgarten Prize (for Foxhounds) in 1888. The American Art Association awarded him its 1889 grand prize of $2,500 for The Night of the Nativity. (Note: "A PRIZE PHILADELPHIAN. Only one prize was offered this year by the Prize Fund Exhibition at the American Art Galleries, consisting of $2,500. It has been awarded to H. R. Poore of Philadelphia for his large nocturne, 'The Night of the Nativity'."—The New York Times, May 12, 1889.) He exhibited that painting and The Bridge—Close of a City Day at the 1893 World's Columbian Exposition in Chicago. He exhibited Foxhounds at the 1901 Pan-American Exposition in Buffalo and was awarded a bronze medal. He exhibited In Holland, The End of the Trail and A Frosty Morning at the 1904 Louisiana Purchase Exposition in St. Louis, and was awarded a silver medal. His exhibit at the 1910 International Exposition in Buenos Aires was awarded a gold medal.

Poore exhibited works in the annual exhibitions of the Pennsylvania Academy of the Fine Arts, most years between 1878 and 1936.

The National Academy elected Poore an associate member in 1888. He was a member of the Philadelphia Sketch Club and the Philadelphia Art Club. In New York City, he was a member of the Lotos Club and Salmagundi Club. His work was also part of the painting event in the art competition at the 1932 Summer Olympics.

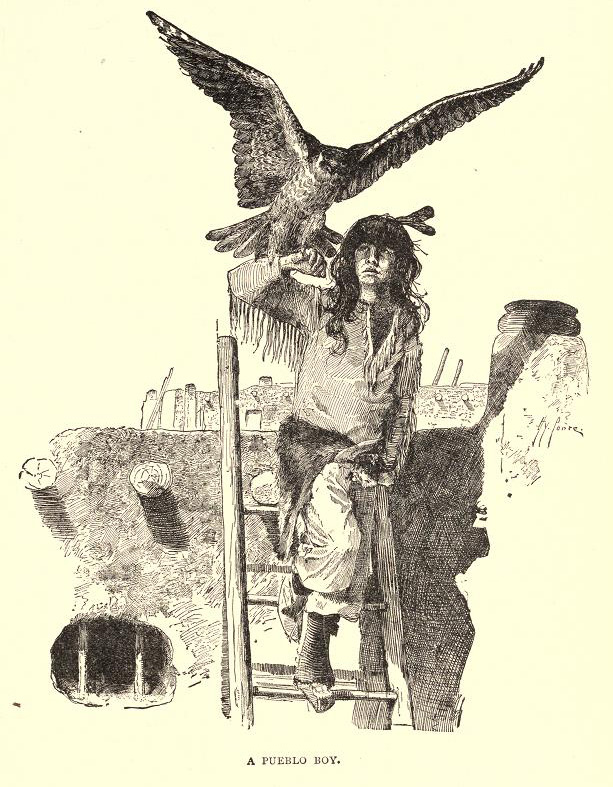
A Pueblo Boy (c. 1882)

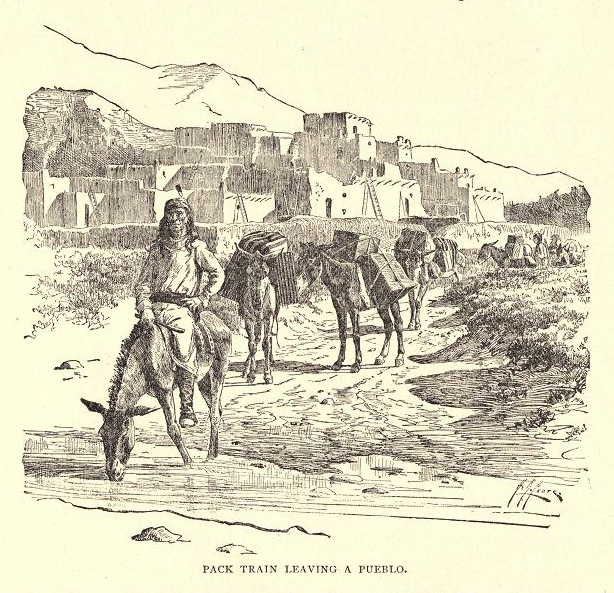
Pack Train Leaving a Pueblo (c. 1882)

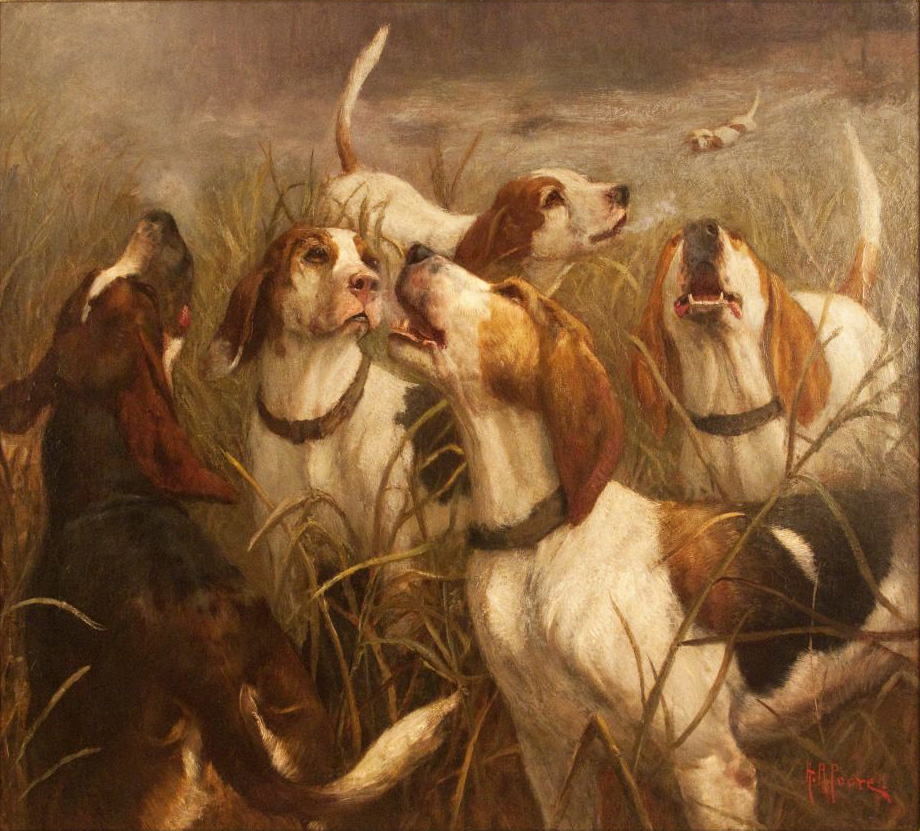
Foxhounds (c. 1885)

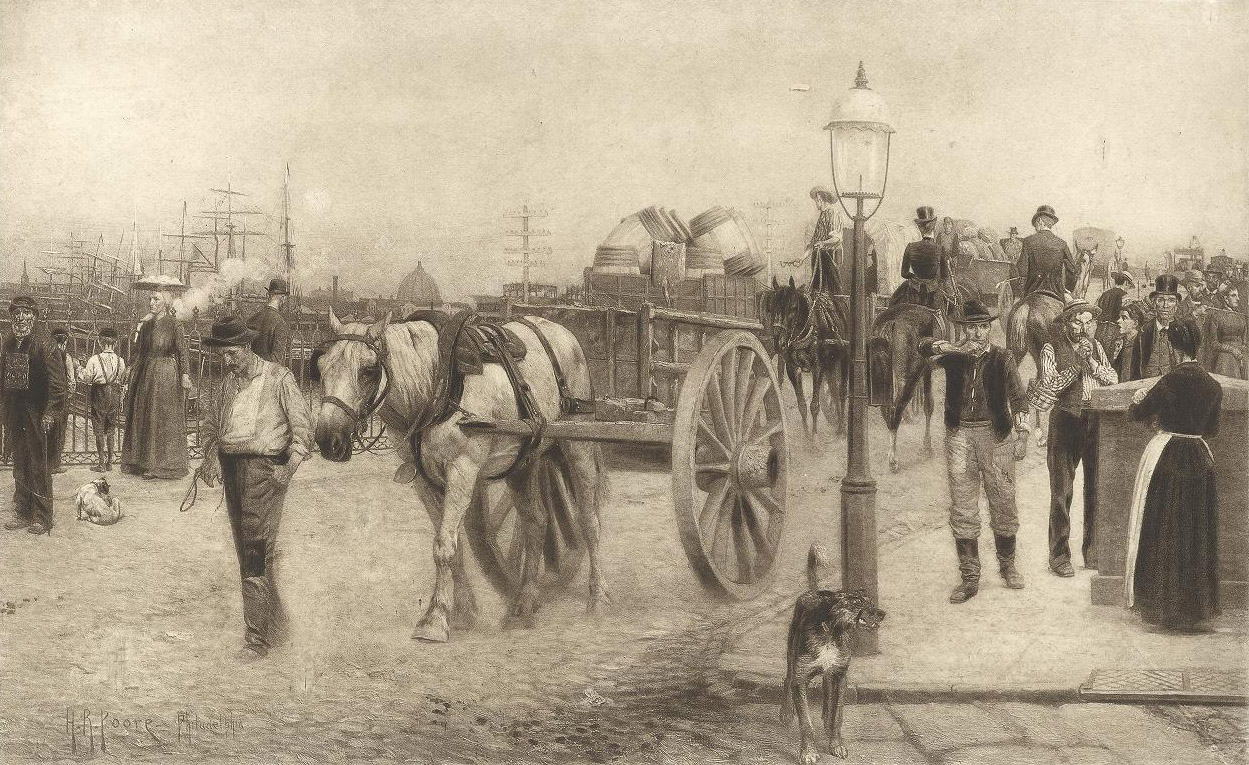
The Bridge—Close of a City Day (c. 1886)

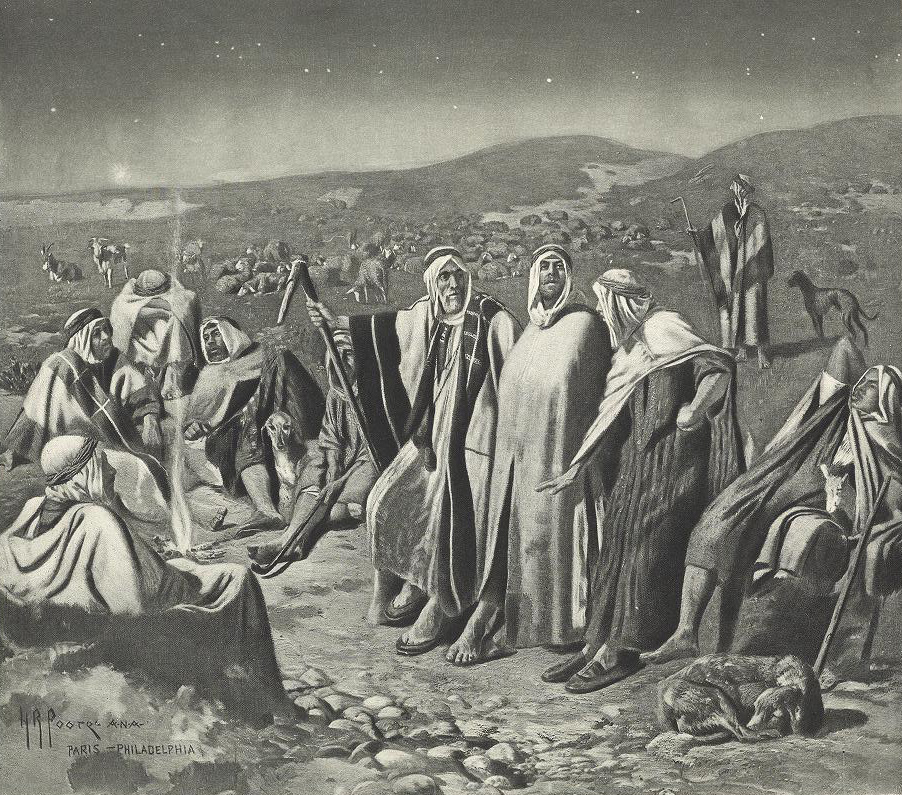
The Night of the Nativity (1889)

== Author ==
Poore published Pictorial Composition and the Critical Judgment of Pictures in 1903, which he described as a "handbook for students and lovers of art". He recommended both painters and photographers consider how to use the fundamental forms he presented to draw the viewer "into the picture", including, in one critic's summary, "left-right balance and the aesthetic application of triangles, circles, crosses, S-curves, and rectangles". A century later, a critic wrote that the volume "still provides a thoughtful analysis of composition".

=== Writings ===
He published under the name Henry R. Poore.

- Art's Place in Education
- Art Principles in Practice
- Figure Composition
- Pictorial Composition and the Critical Judgment of Pictures (NY: Baker and Taylor, 1903)
- The Conception of Art (Putnam's, 1914)
- Modern Art: Why, What and How? (Knickerbocker Press, 1931)
- The New Tendency in Art: Post Impressionism, Cubism, Futurism

== Personal ==
Poore married Katherine Goodnow Stevens of Worcester, Massachusetts, on June 30, 1896. He died in Orange, New Jersey, on August 15, 1940, after a long illness.
