= West 67th Street Artists' Colony =

Historic district in Manhattan, New York

- West 67th Street Artists' Colony Historic District
- U.S. National Register of Historic Places
- U.S. Historic district
- New York State Register of Historic Places
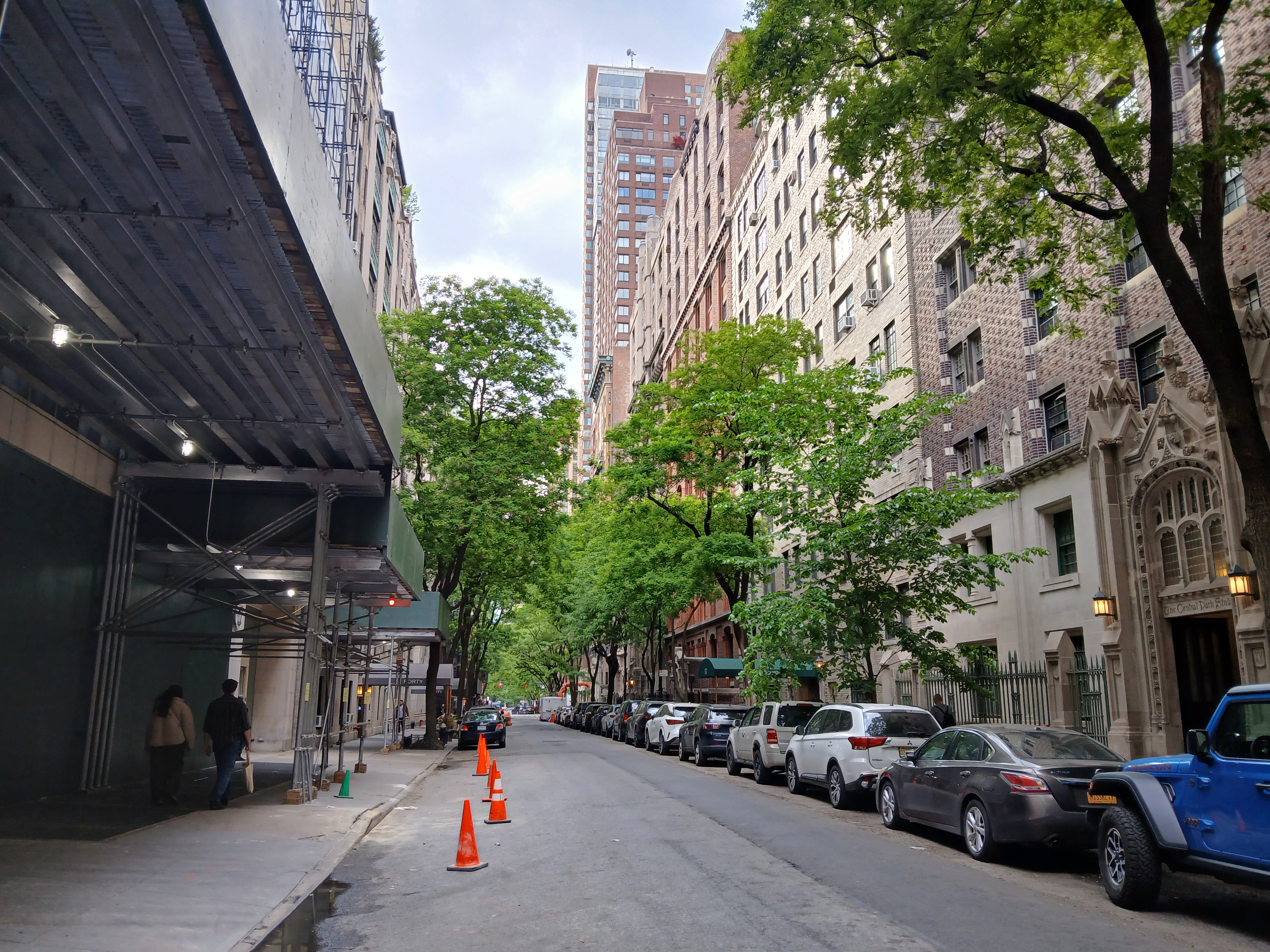

- Location within Manhattan Location within New York City Location within New York Location within the United States
- Location: 1–39 W. 67th St. (odd) and 40–50 W. 67th St. (even), Manhattan, New York, US
- Coordinates: 40°46′25″N 73°58′47″W
- Area: 2 acres (0.81 ha)
- Architect: Multiple
- Architectural style: Renaissance, Gothic, Neo-Gothic
- NRHP reference No.: 85001522

Significant dates
- Added to NRHP: July 11, 1985
- Designated NYSRHP: May 21, 1985

The West 67th Street Artists' Colony is a group of structures in the Lincoln Square neighborhood of Manhattan in New York City, New York, US. Developed as an art colony starting in 1901, it consists of apartment buildings with artists' studios, located on a single city block of 67th Street between Central Park West and Columbus Avenue. The buildings were mostly developed by artists' cooperatives and are generally made of stone and brick. Most of the buildings in the colony are located on the north side of the street, with large north-facing windows in the rear to take advantage of sunlight. Seven apartment buildings and one institutional building are listed on the National Register of Historic Places (NRHP) as a historic district, the West 67th Street Artists' Colony Historic District.

The colony was developed amid a shortage of suitable housing for artists in New York City, at a time when the adjacent portion of the Upper West Side was relatively sparsely developed. The first building in the colony was the 67th Street Studios at 27 West 67th Street, a cooperative developed between 1901 and 1903. The success of the 67th Street Studios led to the development of three more co-op apartment buildings between 1903 and 1907; the Swiss House, a clubhouse, was also built during that period. Two additional buildings, including the Hotel des Artistes, were built in the mid-1910s, followed by two more in the late 1920s and early 1930s. The buildings had become conventional, upper-class co-ops by the late 20th century.

== Description ==
The West 67th Street Artists' Colony is on 67th Street, between Central Park West and Columbus Avenue, in the Lincoln Square neighborhood of Manhattan in New York City, New York, US. Built as an art colony, it includes nine structures in total: six apartment buildings and an institutional building on the north sidewalk at 1–39 West 67th Street, along with two apartment buildings on the south sidewalk at 40–50 West 67th Street. Eight of the structures (six to the north and two to the south) are contributing properties to the West 67th Street Artists' Colony Historic District, which is on the National Register of Historic Places (NRHP). The entire block is also within the boundaries of the Upper West Side–Central Park West Historic District, a larger city district designated by the New York City Landmarks Preservation Commission (LPC). The LPC designation encompasses a ninth building in the colony at 17 West 67th Street, but this building is styled differently from the others and is not a contributing property to the NRHP district. 70 Central Park West (a.k.a. 2 West 67th Street), at the southwest corner of 67th Street and Central Park West, is in the neighboring Central Park West Historic District (also listed on the NRHP) but is sometimes grouped with the other studio buildings. The western end of the block is in close proximity to the Lincoln Center performing arts complex.

The buildings were mostly developed by artists' cooperatives and are generally made of stone and brick. They were designed by a variety of architects including Pollard & Steinam and B. Hustace Simonson. The buildings were all given names that were described by The New York Times writer Richard F. Shepard as "redolent of the arts". Although the National Park Service describes the Colonial Studios at 39 West 67th Street as the colony's only non–Gothic-style building, the LPC characterizes the buildings as being designed in a variety of styles, including the neo-Renaissance and Art Nouveau. Christopher Gray of The New York Times wrote that the buildings' designs were "exhilarating" compared with older co-ops, and Paul Goldberger of the same paper wrote that the building was "a self-contained village as much as it is a New York City block".

To take advantage of sunlight from the north, the five apartment buildings on the northern sidewalk have double-height studio windows at their northern (rear) elevations, facing 68th Street. The buildings include apartments with high-ceilinged studios; though originally intended for artists, these units became popular among non-artists as well. Some units are split across two or three stories. The south side of the street was generally unsuitable for studio development, since northward views from these buildings would be obstructed by the buildings on the northern sidewalk. As such, the two structures on the south side of 67th Street were developed as regular apartment buildings. They have similar window arrangements to the buildings across the street, though neither has double-story studio windows on their northern (front) elevations. The interior plans of these buildings were replicated in subsequent art studio developments elsewhere in New York City, such as 131 East 66th Street.

Developers and architects
| Address / Name | Location | Completed | Developer | Architect | Ref. |
|---|---|---|---|---|---|
| 50 West 67th Street | South side of 67th Street | 1917 | 50 West 67th Street, Inc. | Shape & Bready | |
| 40 West 67th Street | South side of 67th Street | 1929 | 40 West 67 Street Corp. | Rosario Candela | |
| 39 West 67th Street / Colonial Studios | North side of 67th Street | 1907 | Robert W. Vonnoh | Pollard & Steinam | |
| 37 West 67th Street / Swiss House | North side of 67th Street | 1905 | Swiss Benevolent Society | John E. Scharsmith | (Note: Sources disagree on whether work on the Atelier Building began in 1903 or 1904. The construction plans were filed in 1903.) |
| 33 West 67th Street / Atelier Building | North side of 67th Street | 1905 | William J. Taylor | Simonson, Pollard & Steinam | |
| 27 West 67th Street / 67th Street Studios | North side of 67th Street | 1903 | William J. Taylor | Sturgis & Simonson | (Note: Sources disagree on whether construction of the 67th Street Studios began in 1901 or 1902.) |
| 17 West 67th Street | North side of 67th Street | 1931 | Fair Deal Realty Co. | Cronenberg & Leuchtag | |
| 15 West 67th Street / Central Park Studios | North side of 67th Street | 1905 | William J. Taylor | Simonson, Pollard & Steinam | |
| 1 West 67th Street / Hotel des Artistes | North side of 67th Street | 1918 | Hotel des Artistes, Inc. | George Mort Pollard | |

=== North side ===
==== Apartments ====
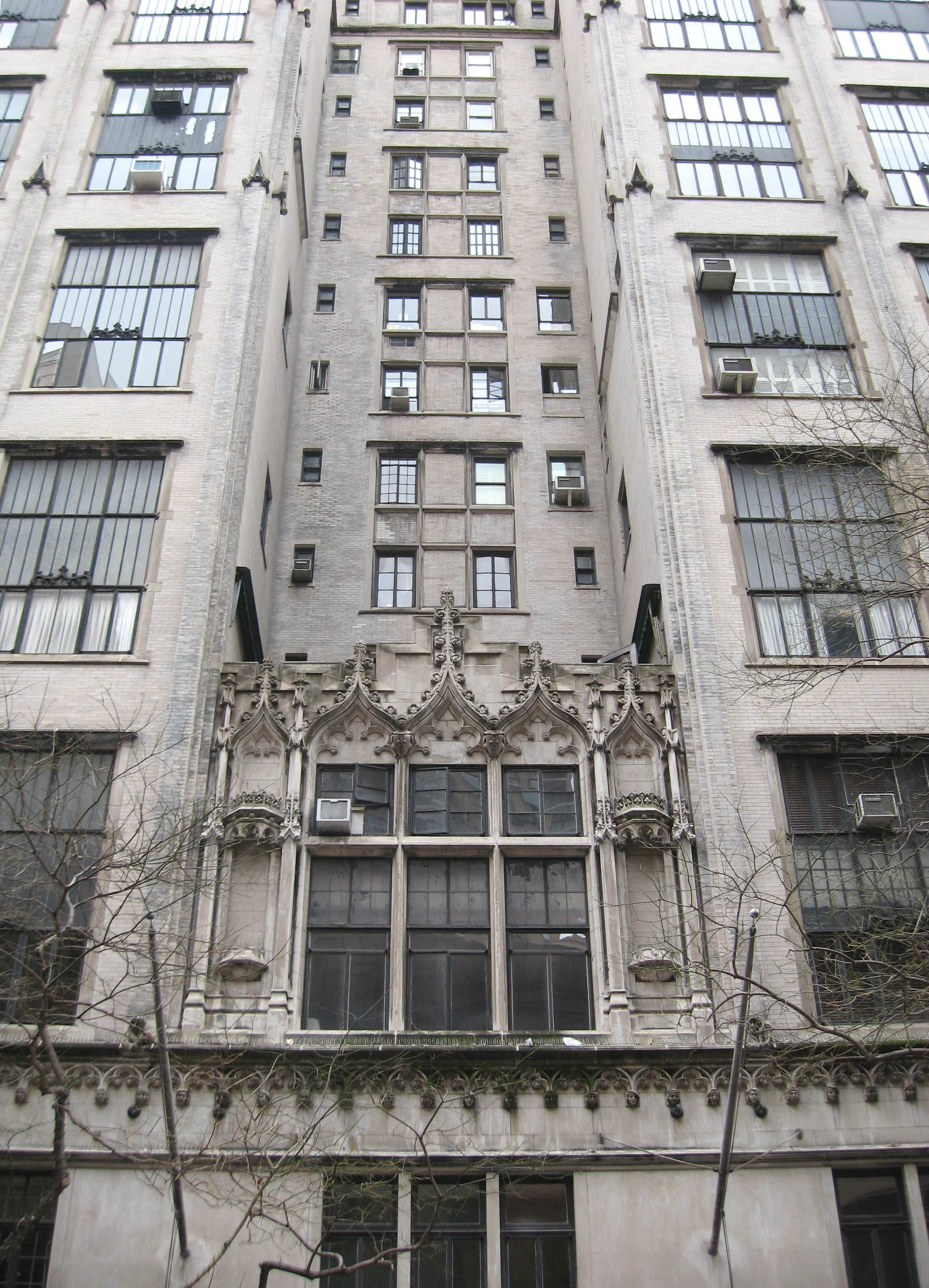
Entrance to Hotel des Artistes

The westernmost building on the north sidewalk is the Colonial Studios at 39 West 67th Street, a 14-story, neo-Renaissance structure. It was designed by Pollard & Steinam. The Colonial Studios is a steel-frame building with a brick, limestone, and copper facade interspersed with double hung windows. The main (southern) elevation has a pediment over its entrance, bands of foliate ornament, and metal bays, while the rear elevation has large windows.

The Atelier Building is at 33 West 67th Street and was designed by Simonson, Pollard & Steinam. The building stands 14 stories high, with a steel frame and a brick, limestone, iron, and terracotta facade interspersed with double hung windows. The facade has elaborate Gothic-style ornamentation at various locations. The limestone base has an entrance with animal and floral motifs, while the upper stories have details such as corbels and pointed arches. The bricks on the facade are oriented so that their narrow ends, or headers, are exposed; the headers are in various shades. In the lobby are murals by artists such as V. V. Sewell and Frank DuMond.

The 67th Street Studios, also known as 27 West 67th Street, was designed by Simonson & Sturgis. The 14-story building, described by the LPC as being in the Art Nouveau or Arts and Crafts styles, has a steel frame with iron columns. Its facade is made of brick and terracotta, with a mixture of double-hung and casement windows; the roof is made of brick and slate. Although the 67th Street Studios was built with gables, these have since been removed. The apartments had spaces with lower ceilings at the front and studios with higher ceilings in the rear.

17 West 67th Street was designed by Gronenberg and Leuchtag. Measuring 12 stories high, it is designed in the neo-Renaissance and Romanesque styles, although the decorations do not complement those of the buildings to either side. 17 West 67th Street has a brick facade and a steel frame. The window openings consist of casement windows, vertical sidelights, and horizontal transoms.

The Central Park Studios at 15 West 67th Street was designed by Simonson, Pollard & Steinam. The building rises 14 stories with a steel frame. The facade is made of brick, limestone, and terracotta. There is elaborate limestone decoration, including a projecting entrance, arches, gablets, and finials on the two lowest stories, and arches, buttresses, and gables on the three highest stories. The intermediate stories are clad in brick, with some of the headers pulled out. The windows are a mixture of arched openings and double-hung units.

At the eastern end of the colony is the Hotel des Artistes, a nine-story building at 1 West 67th Street designed by George Mort Pollard. The building has a brick-and-stone facade, with extensive terracotta or limestone decoration. The lowest two stories are clad in limestone, with trefoils, quatrefoils, finials, and a second-floor cornice. There is an ornate third-story pavilion in the entrance bay, along with finials and arches on the upper stories. The Hotel des Artistes has double-height windows facing both north and south, which consist of either casement windows or pivoting multi-paned units. Inside, the lobby has wood, iron, and plaster decorations and a mural. The structure had a mixture of artists' studios and conventional apartments from the outset, combining elements from studio buildings and apartment hotels. The apartments originally lacked kitchens, and the building has a restaurant (formerly the Café des Artistes), event spaces, and amenities such as squash courts and a swimming pool. There is also a triple-story apartment once used by author Fannie Hurst.

==== Institutions ====
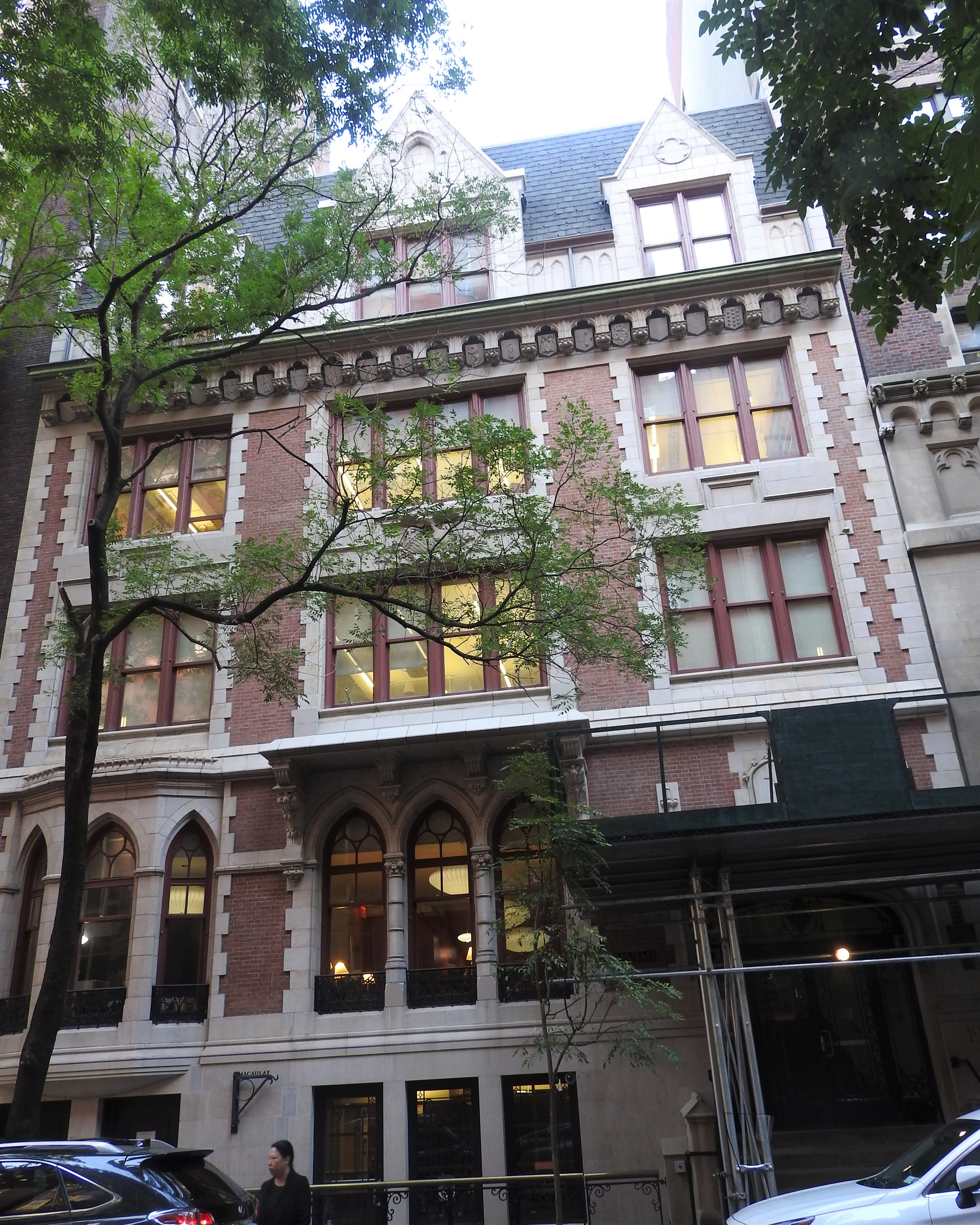
Swiss House

Just east of Colonial Studios is the Swiss House at 37 West 67th Street, a five-story institutional structure designed by John E. Scharsmith. It was originally used by the Swiss Benevolent Society and has been used by William E. Macaulay Honors College since 2008. The Swiss House is a steel-frame building with a brick, limestone, iron, and terracotta facade interspersed with double hung windows. The base is clad with limestone, while on the upper stories, the facade is made of brick, with limestone decorations such as oriel windows, cornices, and balconies. The facade also includes the seals of Switzerland and the United States, along with seals of the Swiss cantons. The Swiss House has a pitched roof and limestone gables. Inside were originally a meeting hall on the first floor and rooms on the upper stories; after Macaulay Honors College moved in, the interiors were turned into education spaces such as classrooms.

=== South side ===
At 50 West 67th Street, Shape & Bready designed a co-op. The steel-framed building has eight stories. Like the district's other buildings, the facade is made of brick and terracotta, featuring double-hung windows. The facade is patterned after the Elizabethan style, with details including a decorative parapet, drip moldings, and shields. The west wing was initially intended for visual artists and the east wing for musicians, though both groups were allowed to buy units in either wing. As such, the building has soundproof walls.

Immediately east, at 40 West 67th Street, Rosario Candela designed another co-op building. The building has nine stories. It is a steel-frame building with a brick and stone facade, along with double-hung or casement windows. Despite 40 West 67th Street's similarities to the district's other buildings, the interiors bear greater similarities to standard apartment buildings than to the studios.

== History ==
=== Background ===
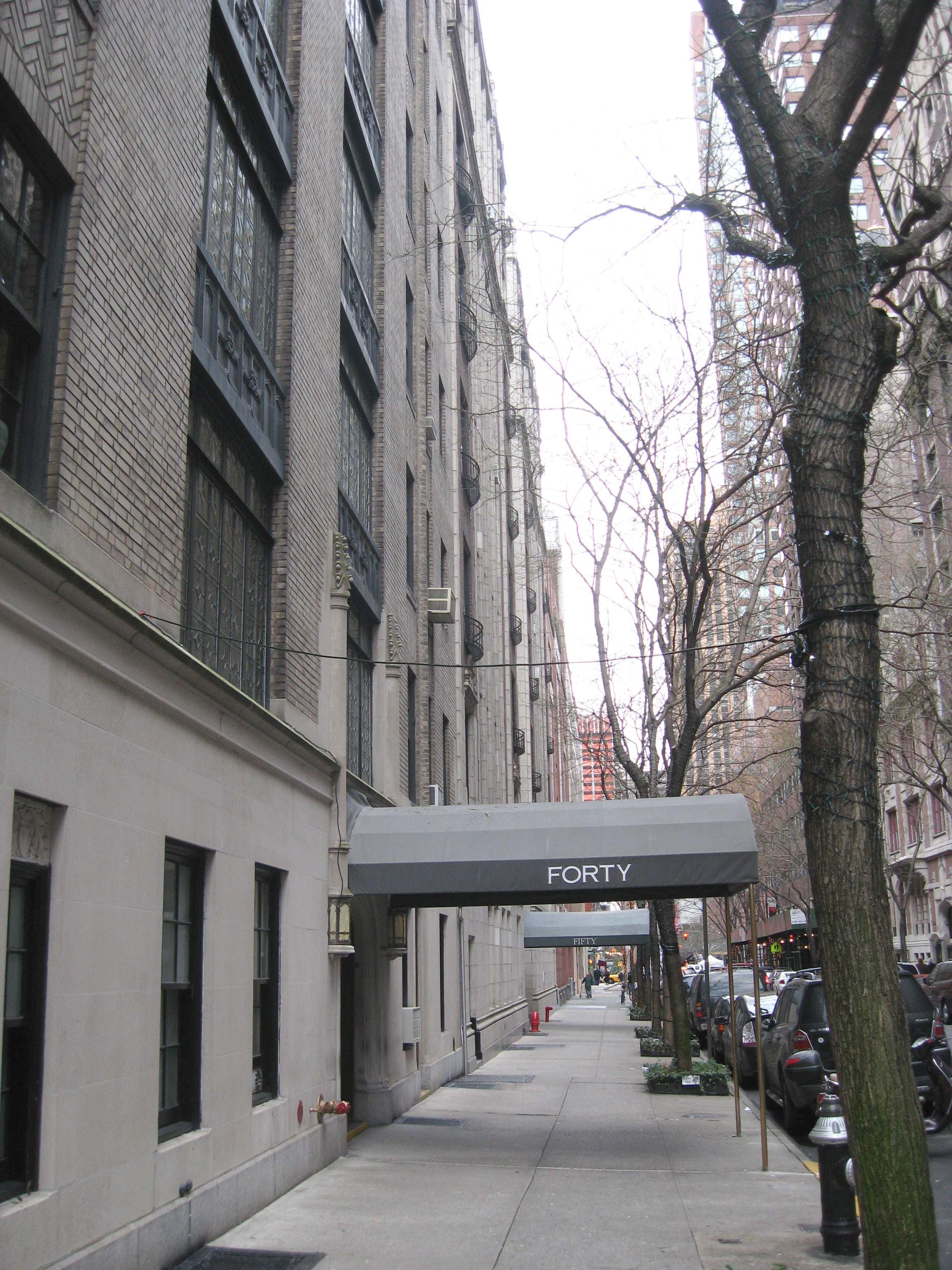
Awnings of 40 and 50 West 67th Street

The surrounding portion of the Upper West Side was originally occupied by the Lenape Native Americans before being settled by the Dutch and then the English in the 17th century. In 1708, the city began constructing an extension of Broadway, then known as Bloomingdale Road, to the modern Upper West Side. At that time the area was rural, and it remained sparsely settled through the 18th and much of the 19th century. With the completion of Central Park in 1876, economic prosperity and improved transit access caused real estate speculators to erect apartment houses in the neighborhood.

Concurrently, cooperative apartment housing in New York City became popular in the late 19th century because of overcrowded housing conditions in the city's dense urban areas. By the early 20th century, the city's artists were competing for a limited number of places in which to live and work. Existing studios tended to be poorly maintained, inconveniently located, or lacking in useful amenities, and were rarely suitable as living quarters. Some, moreover, had their north-facing windows overshadowed by new apartment buildings or had their light disturbed by reflections off other nearby buildings. Artists wanted studios that were big enough for receptions, but such spaces tended to be sited in suboptimal locations; many of the city's artists had set up shop in converted stables. There was such a shortage of suitable studio space that, in 1903, the muralist Robert V. V. Sewell said that "any old skylight or hole in the wall has been placarded with the sign 'Studio to let.'"

=== Development ===
==== 1900s: Original buildings ====
Just before the colony's inception, in 1900, the stretch of 67th Street west of Central Park was mainly used as a service alleyway. The block had vacant lots and industrial uses such as stables, while hotels and apartment buildings were on adjacent blocks, facing away from 67th Street. Most occupants of the site were Black. As such, land on that block was inexpensive. The land immediately north of this section of 67th Street was occupied by low-rise rowhouses, which were subject to a restrictive covenant that prevented their demolition for 25 years. The first building in the colony was the 67th Street Studios at 27 West 67th Street, developed by a syndicate of ten artists led by Henry Ward Ranger. Ranger had first devised plans for an artists' cooperative in the late 1890s, but several years elapsed before he could obtain commitments from nine other artists to help develop the building. The artists unsuccessfully approached several banks for financing until they found one that agreed to finance their venture. William J. Taylor agreed to build the 67th Street Studios, and he took a mortgage on the site. Plans for the 67th Street Studios were filed with the Manhattan Bureau of Buildings in 1901, and the building was completed two years later.

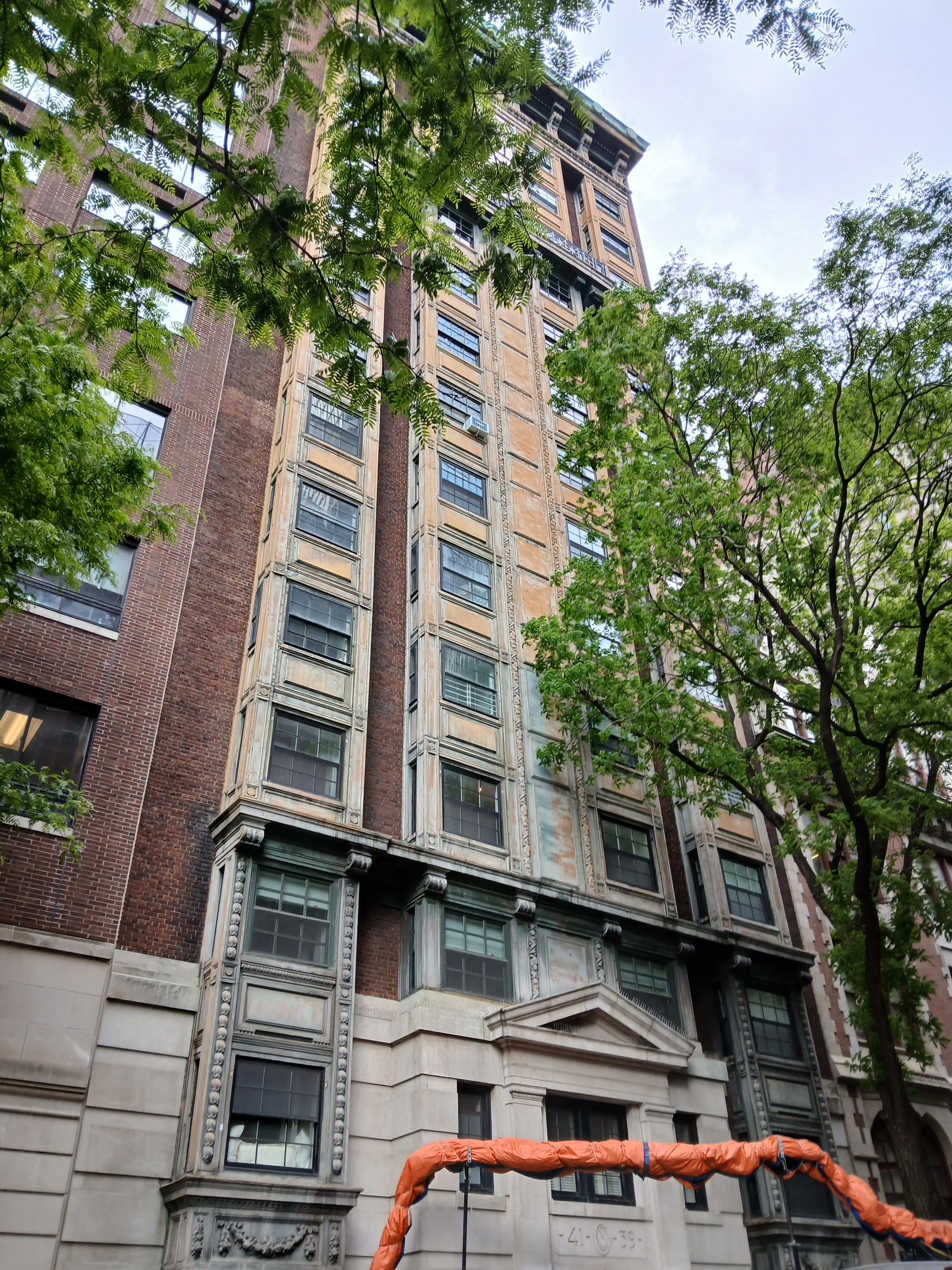
39 West 67th Street, one of the early buildings, developed between 1905 and 1907

With the success of the 67th Street Studios, other studio cooperatives were constructed on the same block and, later, elsewhere across the US. The developers of these buildings formed companies, which took out mortgages for construction and then sold shares to their residents. In these buildings, shareholders owned their personal residences and rented out the other apartments. The next structures to be built in the colony were the Atelier Building and the Central Park Studios. The Atelier and Central Park Studios were built on lots flanking the 67th Street Studios, at 33 and 15 West 67th Street respectively. Ranger began working on the Atelier soon after finishing the 67th Street Studios, and Taylor was retained as that building's developer, filing plans in December 1903. The artist Walter Russell developed the Central Park Studios as his first major structure, filing plans for that building in April 1904. Meanwhile, the Swiss Benevolent Society acquired land for a new clubhouse at 37 West 67th Street in February 1904 and immediately developed the Swiss House on that land. Several of the factors that had enticed the artists' cooperatives—including the presence of Central Park—also influenced the society's decision to build on 67th Street.

The Atelier and Central Park Studios were both completed in 1905, and the Swiss House opened that December. The next building in the colony to be developed was Robert Vonnoh's Colonial Studios at 39 West 67th Street. Plans for that building were filed in 1905. After that building was completed in 1907, there was no new co-op construction for nearly a decade. At the time, there were four co-ops on the block. The Sun wrote that the existing buildings on the block were of "a pleasing old English design", with one site on the north sidewalk and two on the south sidewalk awaiting development. By 1908, nearly all the original shareholders in the three oldest buildings still owned their shares, and many of them had made a substantial profit.

==== 1910s to 1930s ====
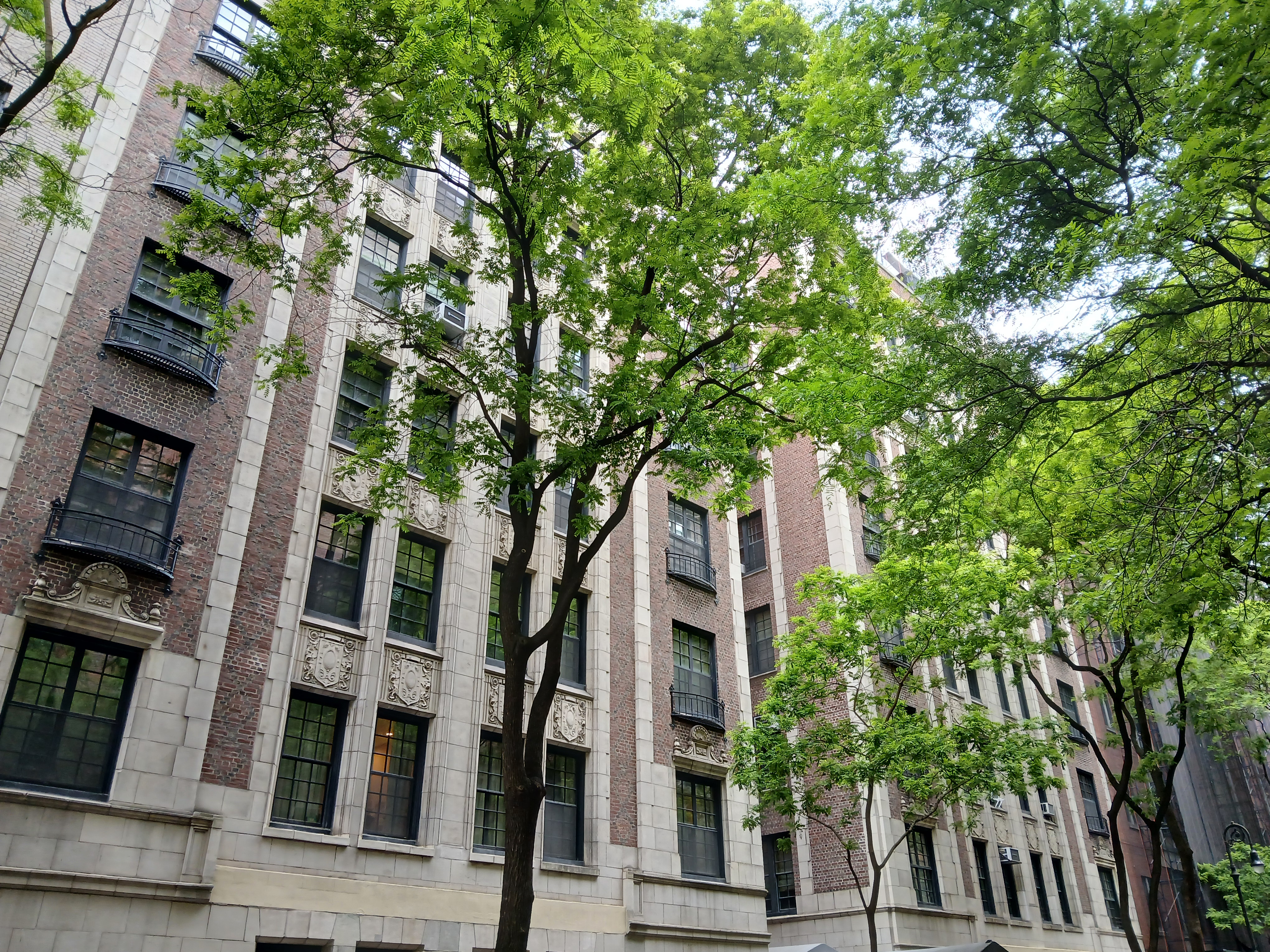
50 West 67th Street, the first building in the colony to be erected on the southern sidewalk

A syndicate of artists acquired land on the north side of 67th Street near Central Park West in late 1914. This became the Hotel des Artistes at 1 West 67th Street, the first structure in the colony since the Colonial Studios. The Artists' Syndicate, the developer of the Hotel des Artistes, also developed an adjacent seven-story hotel on Central Park West, which would be demolished a decade later. Work on another apartment building at 50 West 67th Street, the first on the southern sidewalk, began in November 1915. This coincided with the construction of the neighboring 70 Central Park West, which began early the next year. By then, the buildings in the colony were largely profitable. With three apartments underway or being planned, The Sun wrote that the West 67th Street Artists' Colony was becoming "the new world's art center", and the New-York Tribune called it "New York's principal art colony". 50 West 67th Street opened in 1916, and the Hotel des Artistes was finished the next year.

After 70 Central Park West was completed in 1919, development of cooperative studios on the block largely ceased, and future buildings on the block were limited to standard apartments. In March 1920, yet another group was organized to develop a cooperative studio building at 17 West 67th Street; this building would not be completed until 1931. A dormitory opened at the Swiss House in 1923.

By the 1920s, the land values of some of the colony's lots had quadrupled from two decades prior, and many of the buildings' original shareowners were earning steady profits. Shareholders often paid their co-ops several years' rent in advance and continued to rent out apartments in their respective buildings to non-shareholders. The buildings at 15, 27, and 33 West 67th Street recorded annual rates of return of 17–23%. Many of the cooperatives' residents were not artists; the British magazine The Architectural Review wrote that "the artists are in the minority in some buildings" because of how popular the buildings were with non-artists. The New-York Tribune, writing about another of Russell's works, said the buildings had become "one of New York's foremost art and literary colonies". Russell said in 1925 that many of the cooperative apartments in the colony were generating profits of about double the shareholders' original investment.

=== Later years ===
The buildings had become conventional, upper-class co-ops by the late 20th century, with apartment sales frequently garnering more than $1 million each. For example, in 1970, the Hotel des Artistes was converted into a standard co-op. In 1985, all the structures were listed on the National Register of Historic Places (NRHP) as a historic district, the West 67th Street Artists' Colony Historic District. It became the only art colony in Manhattan to be designated as a historic district. Capital Cities/ABC built a tower on a site adjoining the colony in the late 1980s, eliciting protests from residents, since the tower's design deviated so drastically from those of the studio buildings. Residents of the block also influenced the design of a 32-story tower on Columbus Avenue, whose developer, Daniel Brodsky, added stonework to his tower's facade and eliminated plans for storefronts to blend in with the West 67th Street studio buildings' designs.

Much of the Upper West Side near Central Park West, including the West 67th Street Artists' Colony, was included in the Upper West Side–Central Park West Historic District, designated by the New York City Landmarks Preservation Commission (LPC) in 1990. The Swiss Benevolent Society's dormitory closed in 1991 due to competition from other dorms nearby, and the society sought to sell its building at 37 West 67th Street by 1994. The building was renovated in 1999 by philanthropist Michael Steinhardt, who donated it to the 92nd Street Y in 2001; the Swiss House was then put on sale again. The Swiss House has been used by the City University of New York's William E. Macaulay Honors College since 2008. Apartments in the buildings continued to be resold to non-artistic clients in the early 21st century, often for millions of dollars, though many of the buildings' residents were still affiliated with the arts.

== Notable residents ==
The buildings attracted well-off artists, in contrast to other art colonies such as Greenwich Village which were home primarily to up-and-coming or struggling artists. A 1985 report noted that many of the residents were "not well known today", with some exceptions. The buildings also attracted other professionals who were not artists, including writers and explorers.

| Name | Occupation | Building | Ref. |
|---|---|---|---|
| Carl Akeley | explorer | 33 West 67th Street | |
| Roy Chapman Andrews | explorer | 1 West 67th Street | |
| William Beebe | explorer | 33 West 67th Street | |
| Ludwig Bemelmans | illustrator | 39 West 67th Street | |
| Wladyslaw T. Benda | decorator, mask designer | 1, 27 West 67th Street | |
| Charles Bittinger | painter | 33 West 67th Street | |
| Heywood Broun | writer | 1 West 67th Street | |
| Hugh Carey | politician | 1 West 67th Street | |
| Howard Chandler Christy | mural painter | 1 West 67th Street | |
| Alphaeus Cole | visual artist, etcher | 15 West 67th Street | |
| William Copley | painter | 33 West 67th Street | |
| Noël Coward | writer | 1 West 67th Street | |
| Jo Davidson | sculptor | 1 West 67th Street | |
| Stuart Davis | painter | 15 West 67th Street | |
| Isadora Duncan | dancer | 1 West 67th Street | |
| Marcel Duchamp | painter, sculptor | 33 West 67th Street | |
| Barbara Epstein | editor | 33 West 67th Street | |
| Edna Ferber | writer | 1 West 67th Street | |
| James Montgomery Flagg | designer | 33 West 67th Street | |
| Harriet Whitney Frishmuth | sculptor | 39 West 67th Street | |
| Emil Fuchs | painter, sculptor | 1 West 67th Street | |
| David Garth | advertising consultant | 1 West 67th Street | |
| Paul Goldberger | writer | 1 West 67th Street | |
| Henry Kimball Hadley | conductor | 15 West 67th Street | |
| Ben Ali Haggin | painter, stage designer | 33 West 67th Street | |
| Ben Hecht | writer, director, producer | 39 West 67th Street | |
| Fannie Hurst | author | 1 West 67th Street | |
| Shirley Jones | singer | 33 West 67th Street | |
| Dora Wheeler Keith | artist | 33 West 67th Street | |
| Troy Kinney | visual artist, etcher | 15 West 67th Street | |
| George Lang | restaurateur | 33 West 67th Street | |
| Mortimer Lichtenauer | painter | 15 West 67th Street | |
| John Lindsay | politician | 1 West 67th Street | |
| Robert Lowell | poet | 15 West 67th Street | |
| Willard Metcalf | painter | 1 West 67th Street | |
| Reed Miller | tenor | 50 West 67th Street | |
| Victor Navasky | journalist | 33 West 67th Street | |
| LeRoy Neiman | artist | 1 West 67th Street | |
| Henry Ward Ranger | visual artist | 27 West 67th Street | |
| Noel Rockmore | painter | 33 West 67th Street | |
| Norman Rockwell | portrait painter | 1 West 67th Street | |
| Walter Russell | painter, sculptor | 1, 33 West 67th Street | |
| Leon Solon | painter | 33 West 67th Street | |
| Eugene Spiro | painter | 15 West 67th Street | |
| Nevada Van der Veer | contralto | 50 West 67th Street | |
| Bessie Potter Vonnoh | sculptor | 33 West 67th Street | |
| Hubert Vos | painter | 15 West 67th Street | |
| Alexander Woollcott | writer | 1 West 67th Street | |
| Peter Yarrow | singer-songwriter | 27 West 67th Street | |

== See also ==
- List of New York City Designated Landmarks in Manhattan from 59th to 110th Streets
- National Register of Historic Places listings in Manhattan from 59th to 110th Streets
- West 73rd–74th Street Historic District, farther north on Central Park West
- West 76th Street Historic District, farther north on Central Park West

== Sources ==
- Alpern, Andrew (January 1, 1992). Luxury Apartment Houses of Manhattan: An Illustrated History. Courier Corporation. ISBN 978-0-486-27370-9.
- David, A.C. (October 1903). "A Co-Operative Studio Building". Architectural Record. Vol. 14, no. 4. pp. 232–254.
- National Register of Historic Places Inventory/Nomination: West 67th Street Artists' Colony Historic District (PDF) (Report). National Park Service. 1985. With accompanying pictures
- Central Park West Historic District (PDF) (Report). New York City Landmarks Preservation Commission. April 24, 1990.
- Stern, Robert A. M.; Gilmartin, Gregory; Massengale, John Montague (1983). New York 1900: Metropolitan Architecture and Urbanism, 1890–1915 (1900 ed.). New York: Rizzoli. ISBN 0-8478-0511-5.
- Wallace, Mike (2017). Greater Gotham: A History of New York City from 1898 to 1919. New York: Oxford University Press. ISBN 978-0-19-511635-9.
