= 27 West 67th Street =

Apartment building in Manhattan, New York

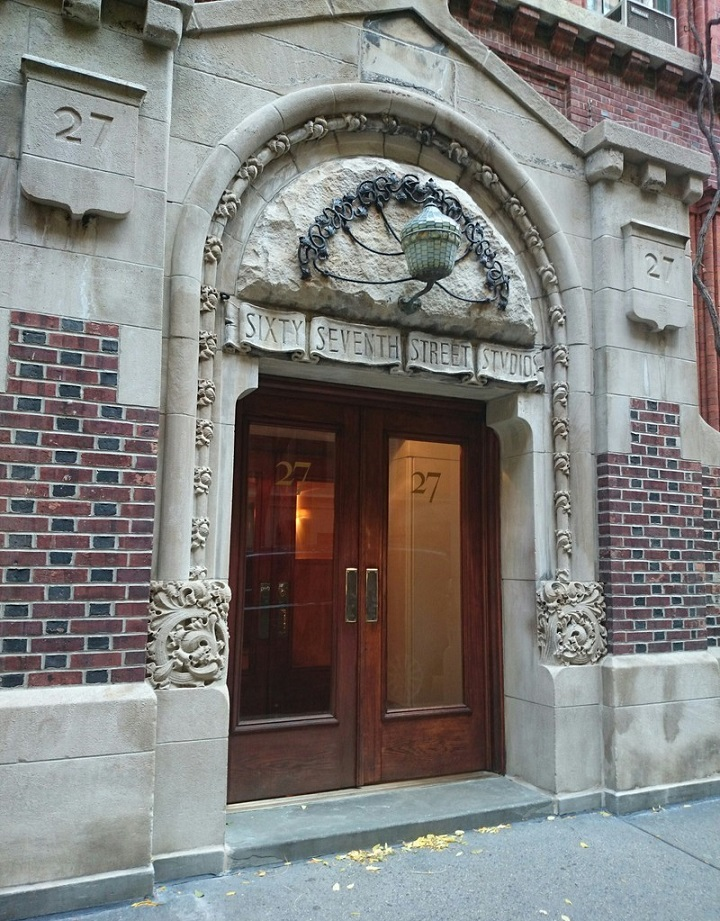
- 27 West 67th Street
- Interactive map of the 27 West 67th Street area
- Former names: Sixty-Seventh Street Studios

General information
- Type: Co-operative residential apartments
- Location: Manhattan, New York City, United States
- Coordinates: 40.77401°N 73.97965°W
- Construction started: 1902
- Opened: 1903

Technical details
- Floor count: 14

Design and construction
- Architects: D.M.B. Sturgis and H.B. Simonson
- 67th Street Studios
- U.S. Historic district – Contributing property
- Location within Manhattan Location within New York City Location within New York Location within the United States
- Location: Manhattan, New York City, United States
- Part of: West 67th Street Artists' Colony Historic District (ID85001522)
- Added to NRHP: July 11, 1985

27 West 67th Street (also known as 67th Street Studios) is a cooperative apartment building located in the West 67th Street Artists' Colony near Lincoln Square on the Upper West Side of Manhattan, New York City, United States. Completed late in 1902 and opened early the next year, it was designed by artist Henry Ward Ranger and financed by an association of his fellow artists. Ranger's innovative design provided for compact duplex apartments conjoined with large north-facing studios. The association was organized as a corporation whose financial structure followed a cooperative model. The corporation built and managed the co-op while its artist-investors held leases for the studio apartments they occupied. The project was an immediate success, leading other artist-investors to finance and build similar studio co-ops nearby. In 1995, following a thorough restoration, the architectural historian Christopher Gray wrote that the building was "one of the most important apartment houses in the history of New York City". As evidenced by the cost of ownership and demand for its studio apartments, the co-op has continued to thrive in the early years of the 21st century.

== Background ==
=== Site history ===
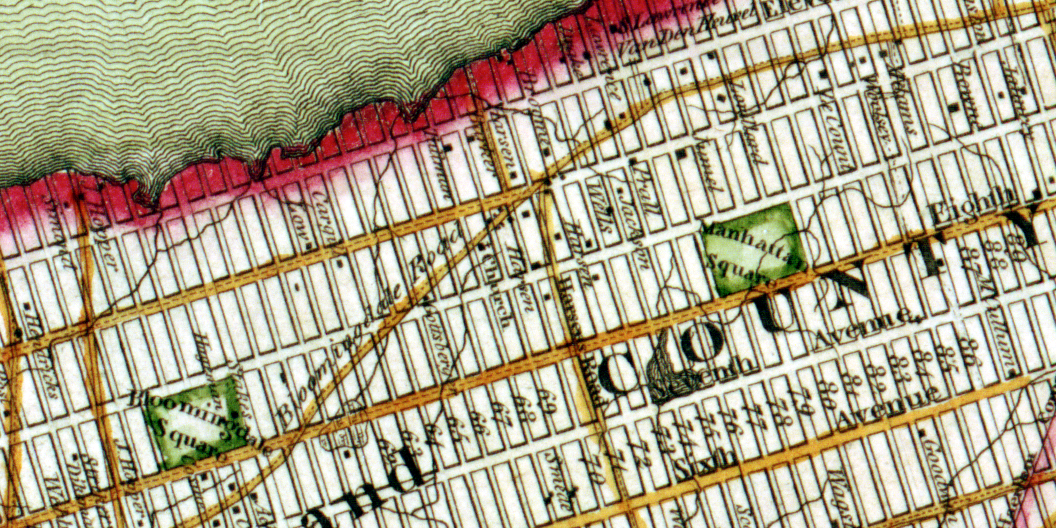
Image No. 1, detail from The City of New York as laid out by the Commissioners with the surrounding country by John Randel (1821, colored map, 19 x 33 cm.)

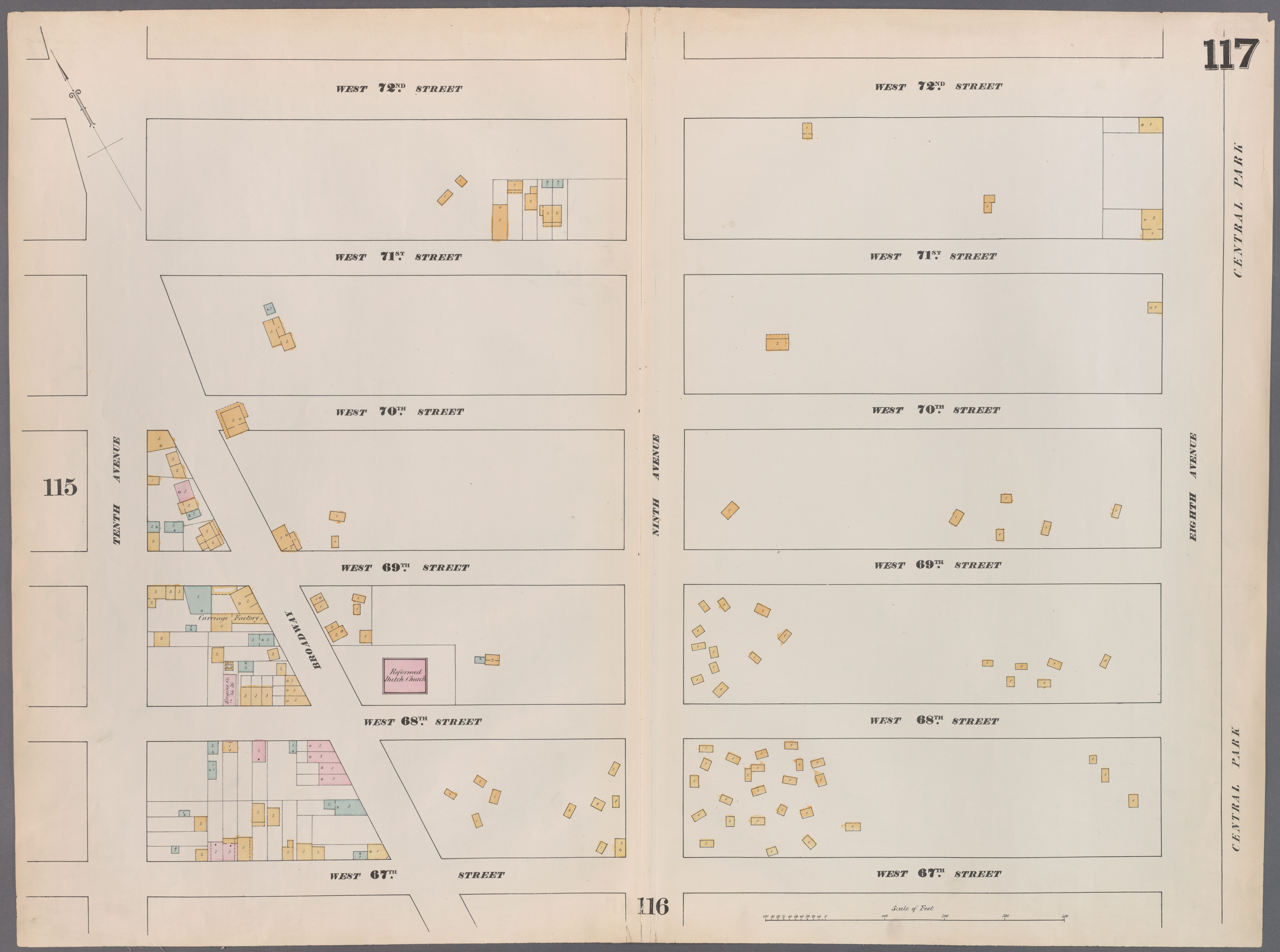
Image No. 2, Map bounded by West 72nd Street, Eighth Avenue, West 67th Street, Tenth Avenue, Plate 117, 1857

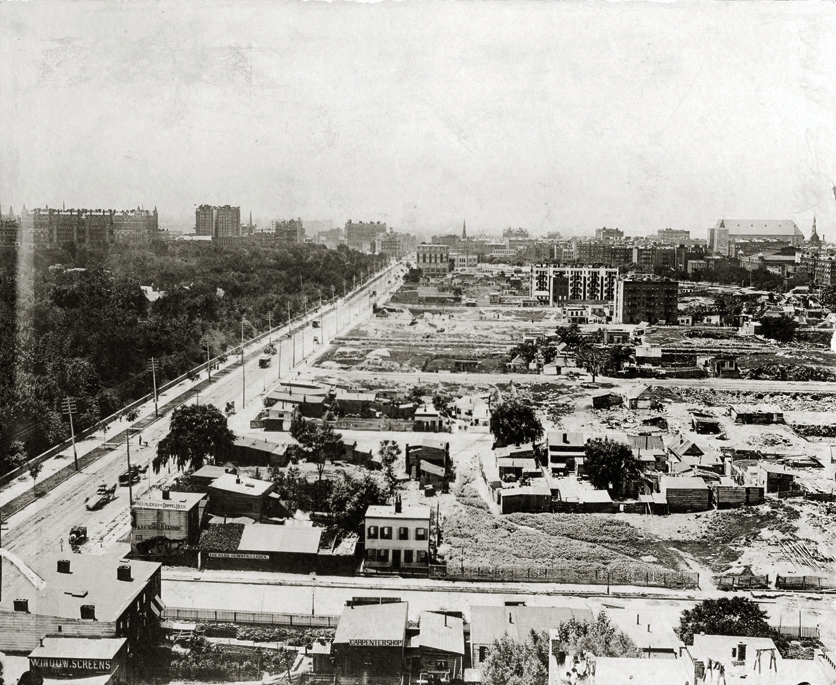
Image No. 3, Central Park West and 72nd Street, looking south from the Dakota, ca. 1890

The Dutch of New Amsterdam had forced the original Indian tribes off Manhattan Island before the English took control in 1674. In 1708 the city began to make the Upper West Side accessible to residents by building an extension of Broadway called Bloomingdale Road. At that time the area was rural, and it remained sparsely settled through the 18th and much of the 19th century. A detail from a map prepared in 1821 shows its dispersed farmhouses. See Image No. 1. A sheet from a fire insurance atlas made about forty years later shows a few substantial brick buildings close to Bloomingdale Road but only a smattering of small wooden structures in and near the block where the studio building would later be constructed. See Image No. 2. Following the completion of Central Park in 1876, speculators began to place large apartments like the elegant Dakota on the blocks between the park's western boundary and Columbus Avenue, but most of the area still remained home to squatters' shanties, stables, lumber yards, and disreputable saloons, and many of its streets remained unpaved. A photo taken from the roof of the Dakota about 1890 shows Central Park West at left and the area to its west from 72nd Street south to 59th or 60th. See Image No. 3.

Economic prosperity, the attractions of Central Park, expansion of the rapid transit system, and improvements in elevator technology, together with the relatively low cost of land, caused real estate speculators to put up large apartment houses, mostly, like the Dakota, on the avenues and broad crosstown streets in the neighborhood.

=== Demand for artists' studios ===
Often called the city's Gilded Age, the period between 1870 and 1900 was remarkable for its economic growth, for the displays of wealth by its opulent citizens, and for the dramatic expansion of its cultural activity. Newly prosperous New Yorkers began to assemble art collections, first concentrating on highly regarded European artists and then, increasingly, on paintings and sculptures by Americans. By 1912, as one artist put it, "the American artist's work is [now] as good an investment artistically and financially as his fellow artists abroad." This artist concluded by writing, bluntly, that investment in the work of American artists "will pay better than so many stocks and bonds". At the turn of the century the city's newly prosperous artists found themselves with more money to spend on studios and apartments but also, as prosperity induced a general quest for improved living standards, with more competition with each other for a limited number of places in which to live and work. The relatively few studios that existed tended to be poorly maintained, inconveniently located, or lacking in useful amenities. Very few were suitable as living quarters, forcing artists to rent apartments and studios separately. Some, moreover, had their north-facing windows overshadowed by new apartment buildings or had their light disturbed by reflections off other nearby buildings. Contemporaries pointed out that artists wanted studios that were big enough for the receptions they held for collectors and friends but that studios of that size tended to be poorly located, often in converted stables within unattractive neighborhoods.

=== Demand for cooperative apartments ===
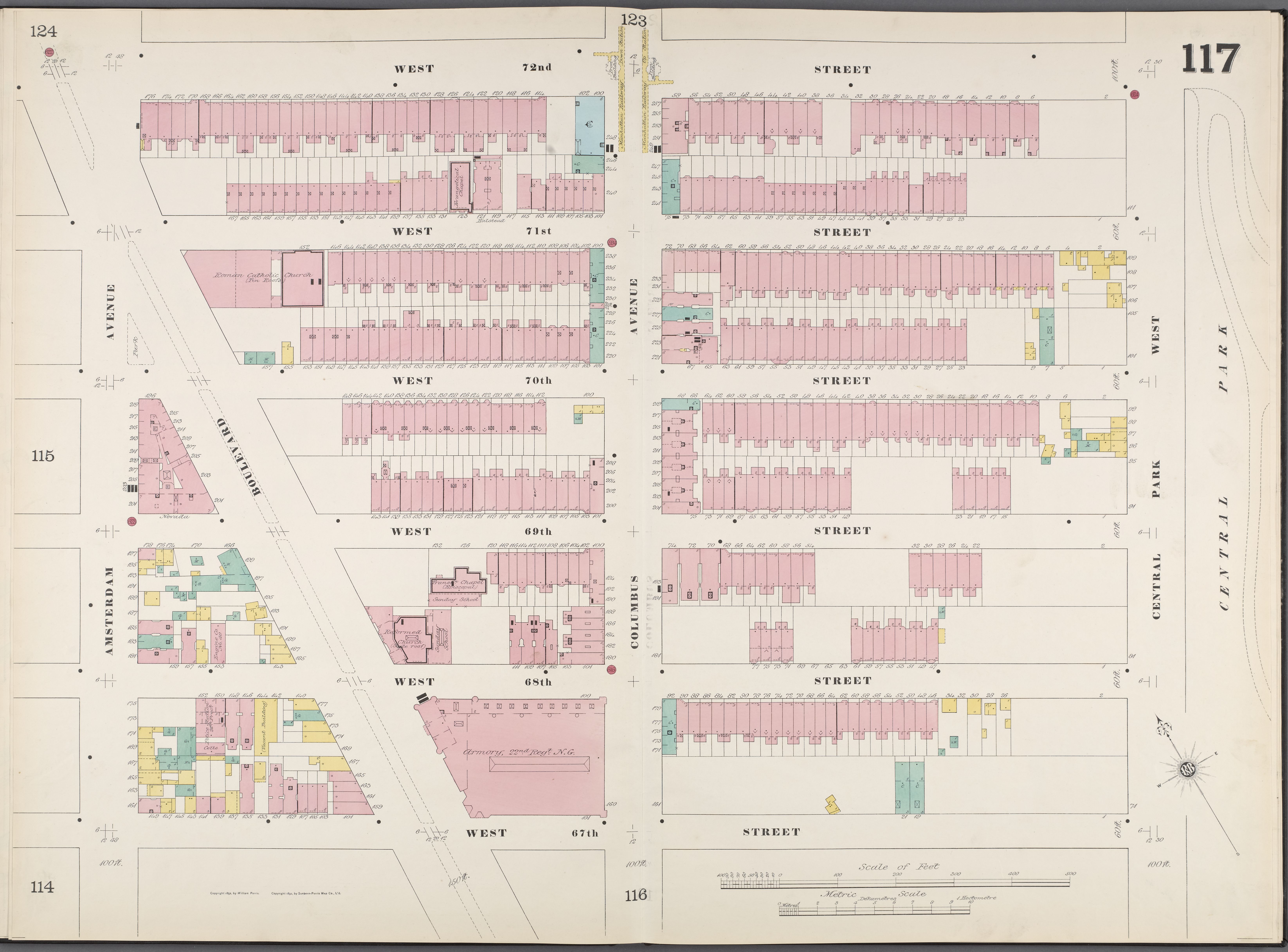
Image No. 4, Manhattan, V. 6, Double Page Plate No. 117 [Map bounded by W. 72nd St., Central Park West, W. 67th St., Amsterdam Ave.], 1892

The cooperative model for financing and erecting apartment buildings was not new when the 67th Street studio apartment was built. There was even precedent for artist co-ops, but by the end of the 19th century few existed and, as one writer said, the practice of co-op construction was then "languishing". One of the strengths of the model was also a drawback: the men who formed cooperative associations had to have trust in one another, a willingness to withstand market fluctuations, and savings to invest. By the end of the 19th century so many artists had achieved economic success that one of their number, who recognized the advantages of the cooperative model, was able to find a few like-minded associates who trusted one another, tolerated risk, and were willing to join with him. One of their motivations was strictly financial: the traditional method of constructing apartment buildings was risky, wasteful, and excessively expensive. As one writer said, the ordinary practice at the time relied heavily on short-term loans, middle-man markups, and the need to insure against the risk of a deal failing before the building was opened and rented out. The writer concluded that in strictly financial terms a cooperative venture would have "an enormous advantage over the ordinary speculative operator." As well as saving money, the artists who joined expected to obtain working and living conditions far better than traditional apartment buildings could provide. As a writer of the time noted, artists had no say in the design or operation of the many newly built apartment houses and believed themselves compelled to pay high rents for inadequate accommodations.

== Organization of the cooperative association ==
At the peak of his career, Henry Ward Ranger had achieved remarkable success. Writers called him the "dean of American landscape painters", described him as a "commanding figure" and "pictorial genius", and concluded, shortly before his death, that he was "unquestionably one of the few great artists America has produced." An exhibition held shortly after he died set an American record for the average price per picture of works by a single artist.

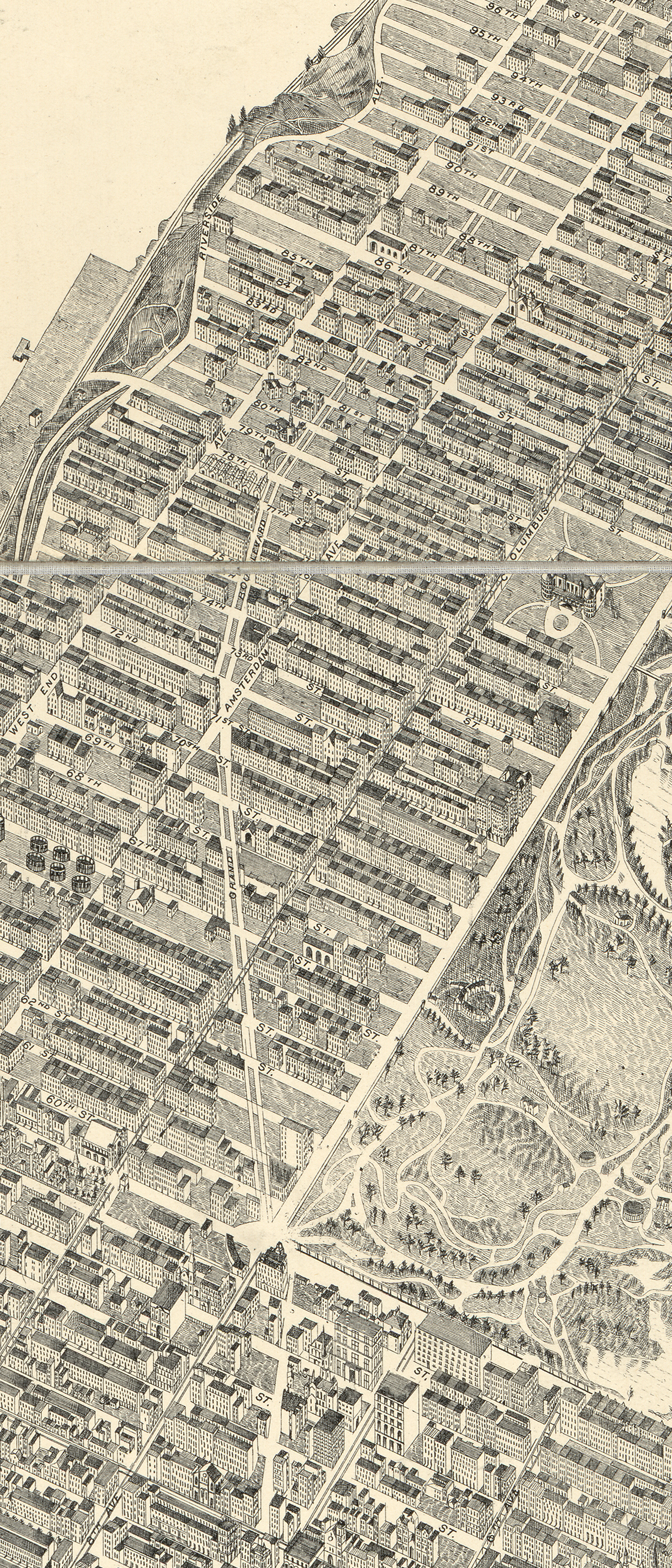
Image No. 5, Detail from Bird's-eye-view of Manhattan and adjacent districts, New York City, 1900

In the late 1880s, having grown frustrated with the studio arrangements that were available to him, Ranger took matters into his own hands. Having prepared detailed plans for a studio building, he sought a builder willing to carry out the project. Finding none, he assembled a small group of like-minded artist-investors to form a cooperative association. In 1898 the group discussed options and agreed to form a corporation whose stockholders would finance, construct, occupy, and manage a new studio apartment building. They arranged that the stock they purchased would be non-assessable, meaning the corporation could not put them under any further financial obligation, and they understood they would be jointly responsible for covering any losses the corporation might incur. After forming the corporation and funding it, they arranged a $160,000 mortgage from the Greenwich Savings Bank. These steps convinced builder William J. Taylor to agree to erect the building. Taylor and the corporation of artists selected D.M.B. Sturgis and B.H. Simonson as architects and work began early in 1901.

Ranger became the corporation's president. The secretary was Louis Paul Dessar. Jules Turcas was treasurer. The directors were Childe Hassam, Frank DuMond, Charles Frederick Naegele, Robert Van Vorst Sewell, Sydney A. Smith, and Alan Butler Talcott. The name they chose for the corporation was the Sixty-seventh Street Studio Building Association of New York City. By the time the building opened in March 1903, another artist, Walter Russell, had purchased stock and joined the association. Among those who signed on as tenants when the building was under construction were the artists Robert Vonnoh and his wife Bessie Potter Vonnoh, and Charles Graham.

The building had a mix of large and small studio apartments. Most of the large ones were intended for the cooperative investors and all the small ones were to be rented. The stockholders each paid rent to the corporation for the apartments they occupied. Based on a square foot computation, the rents were lower than were then charged in comparable fireproof buildings. The large studios rented at $2,000 per year. The small studios came in two configurations, the larger ones renting for $750 and the smaller ones for $600. Stockholders received dividends based on the total income of the property from apartment rentals less the corporation's outlays (mortgage payments, operating expenses, and money set aside as reserve). Shares of stock were apportioned according to the size of the apartment occupied, and each stockholder paid a portion of overall expenses. Stockholders were permitted to rent out their apartments if they wished. The corporation would assess the stockholders to make up shortfalls in years when there was a net loss if this were ever to happen.

== Location and design ==
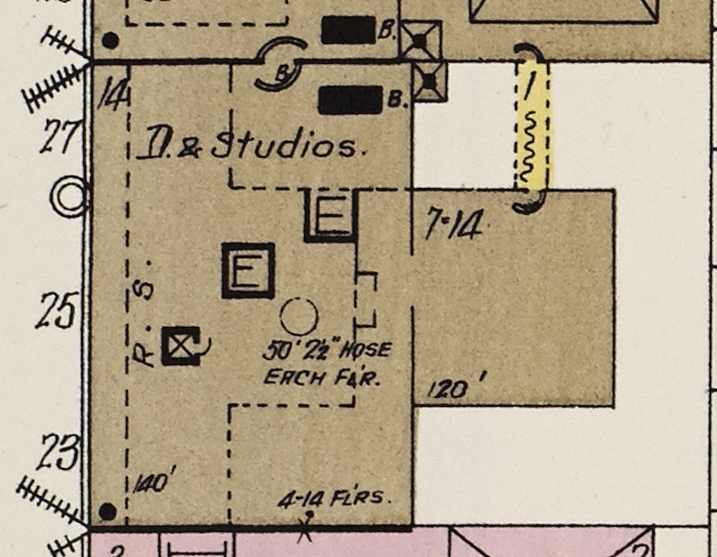
Image No. 6, Detail from Manhattan, V. 6, Plate No. 26 [Map bounded by Columbus Ave., W. 70th St., Central Park West, W. 67th St.]

As its construction site, the corporation bought a parcel of three vacant lots in the middle of the north side of 67th Street between Central Park West and Columbus Avenue. The site was close to rapid transit, near Central Park, and surrounded by many buildings that had recently been erected in the neighborhood. While a fire insurance map of 1892 had revealed very little, a detail from a birds-eye-view published just before construction began shows substantial construction. See Images Nos. 4 and 5. At the back of the parcel was a group of single-family brownstone-fronted homes that were low enough not to overshadow the north side of the studio building and, due to a covenant restricting their alteration, would not overshadow it for at least the next 25 years.

The architects produced the drawings that Taylor needed, but made few changes in Ranger's designs. In 1909 Taylor told an interviewer, "Mr. Ranger's plans worked out perfectly in every detail."

Since the three lots each measured 25 by 100 feet and since there were no setback rules in force, the building could theoretically have measured 75 feet wide by 100 feet deep. Ranger's design was more compact: a street-facing rectangular section 75 wide by 52.5 feet deep having a square extension at its back measuring 32.5 on a side. A detail from a fire insurance map of 1907 shows the plot and the building's shape. See Image No. 6.

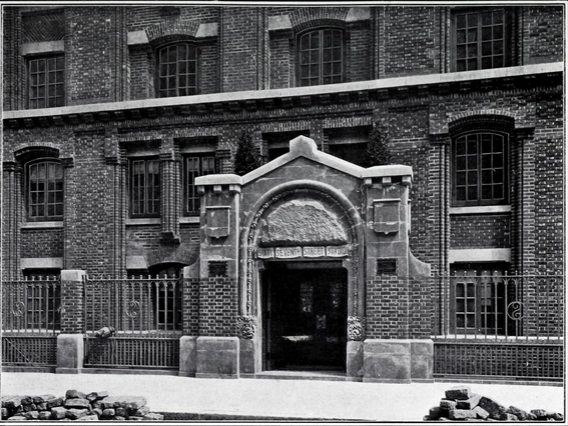
Image No. 7, Entrance to 27 West 67th Street, from The Architectural Record (October 1903, Vol 14, Iss 4, p. 237)

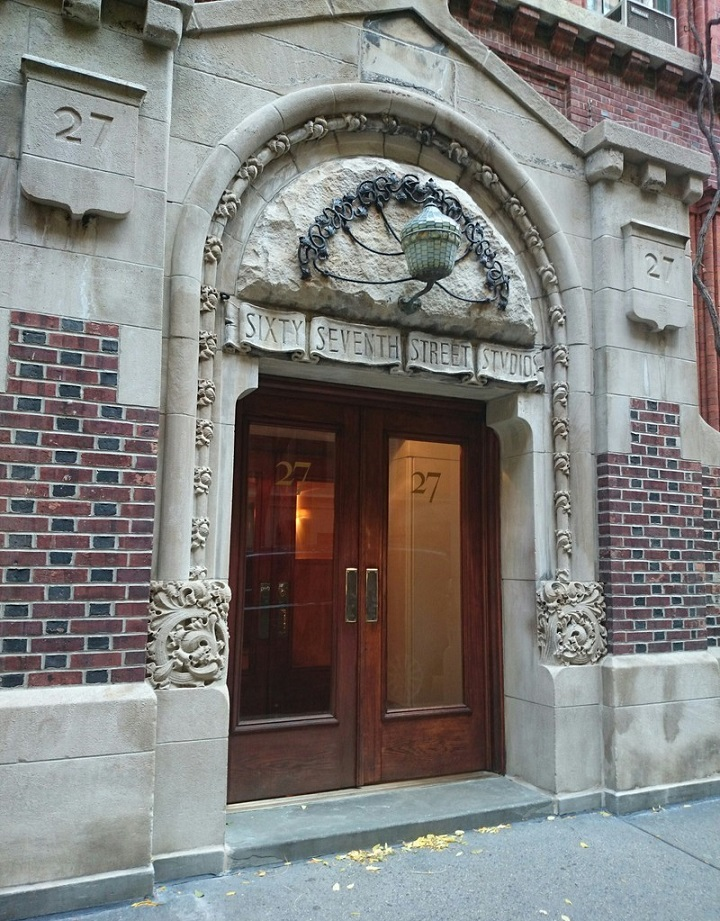
Image No. 8, Entrance to 27 West 67th Street in 2022

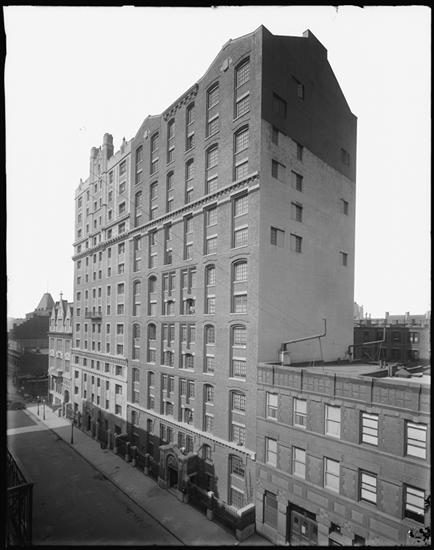
Image No. 9, 27 West 67th Street Studio building in 1903

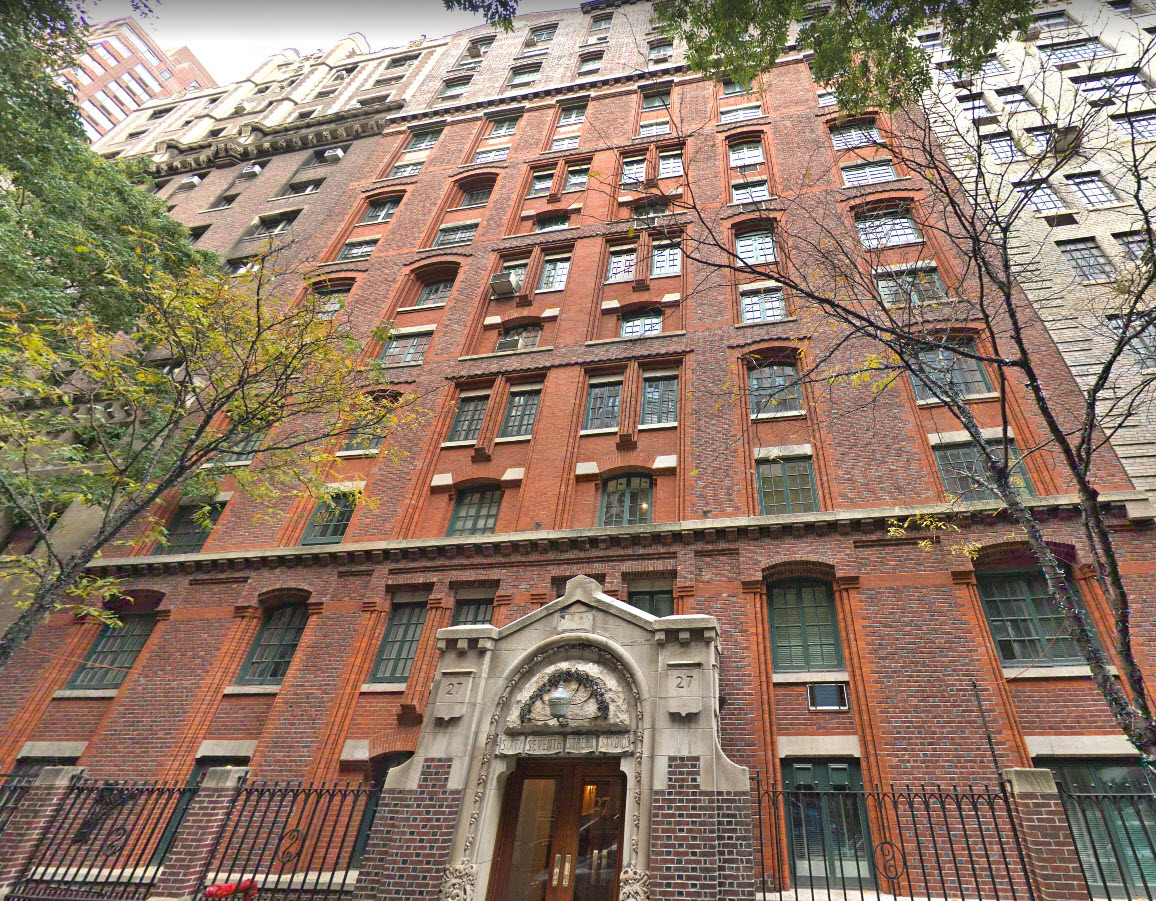
Image No. 10, Facade of 27 West 67th Street in 2022

The building was constructed of brick, structural iron, and other fireproof materials and had a slate and brick roof. Its front wall was decorated in a pattern of colored bricks with molded brick window borders. The windows were multi-paned green casements. The ornamentation was in the then-current version of neo-Gothic design. Some of the detail work can be seen in a photo of the entrance that was taken during construction. See Image No. 7. A modern photo shows how it looked when complete. See Image No. 8.

A photo taken about 1905, after a companion studio building had been built on its west side, shows the location of the entrance and the general appearance of its facade, and shows as well the back of the low buildings to its north. See Image No. 9. A modern photo shows the facade as it looked in 2022. See Image No. 10.

Ranger's design called for duplex construction of its 14 large studio apartments. There were two of these on each floor, each with a large north-facing studio at back and two floors of apartment rooms at the front of the building. From the back, the rectangular section showed seven floors while from the front it showed 14. The square section at back did not have the duplex feature. It contained 20 smaller studio apartments in 10 floors.

The large studios in the rectangular section had 18-foot ceilings and measured 30 feet long by 25 feet wide. The suite of duplex rooms that lay behind the studios all had nine-foot ceilings. On the lower level of the duplex section, the apartments each had a dining room, library, and kitchen, as well as a pantry, foyer, and toilet. On the upper level were four bedrooms, a bathroom, a foyer, and a balcony that overlooked the studio. A stairway connected the studio with the balcony. The elevators stopped at both levels of the duplex apartments. For every studio, there was a servant's room on the building's top floor. A modern commenter has called the duplex design "an ingenious cross-sectional arrangement that kept cost down and maximized the use of space".

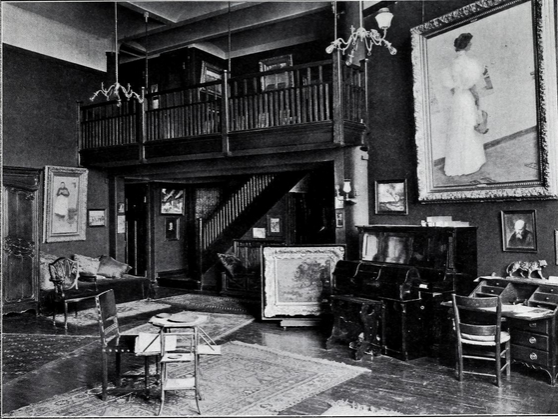
Image No. 11, Studio of Louis Paul Dessar in 1903

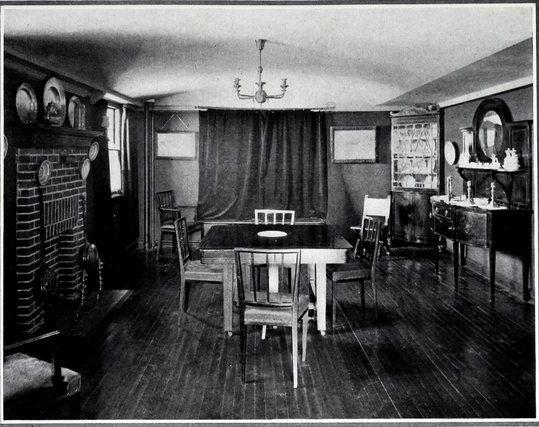
Image No. 12, Dining Room of Louis Paul Dessar in 1903

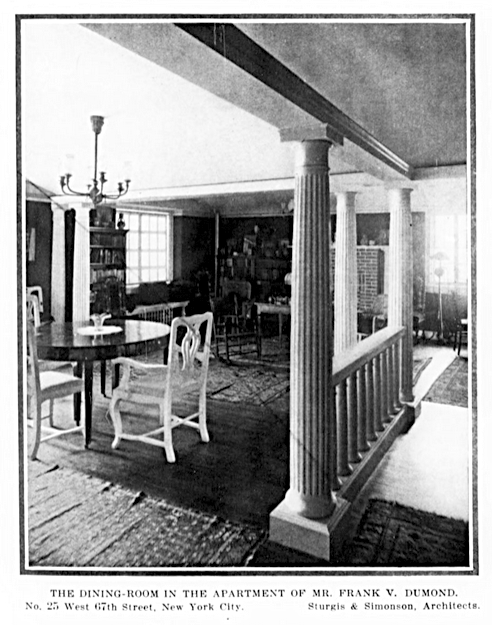
Image No. 13, Dining Room in the Apartment of Frank DuMond in 1903

An issue of Architectural Record published in 1903 provided photos of the studio apartments occupied by some of the co-op owners. One of them, taken with the photographer's back to the north-facing studio window, shows two levels of the duplex apartment on the south side, with balcony and stairs. See Image No. 11. Another shows this artist's lower-level dining room with fireplace and curtained opening to the studio. See Image No. 12. One of the owner-artists had the partitions between the dining room and study removed to make a single large multi-purpose room. See Image No. 13.

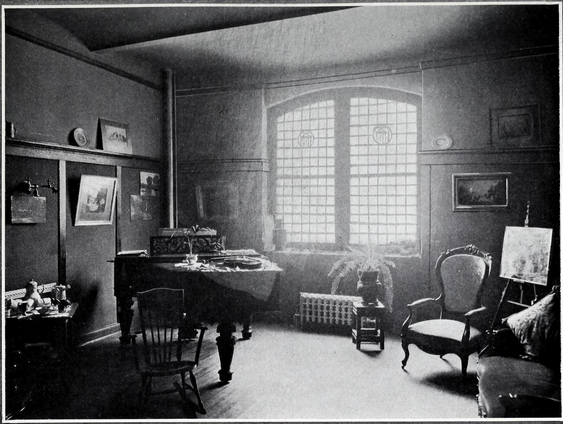
Image No. 14, Apartment of B. H. Simonson in 1903

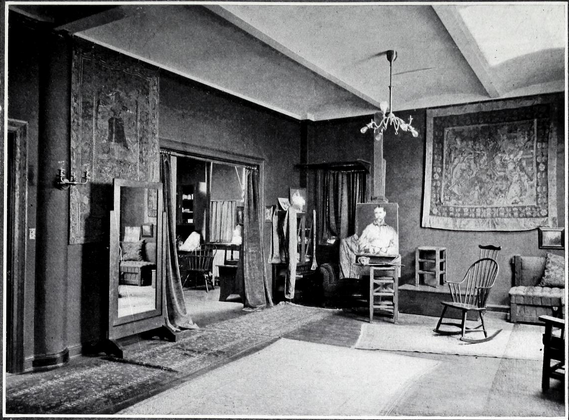
Image No. 15, Studio of Robert Vonnoh in 1903

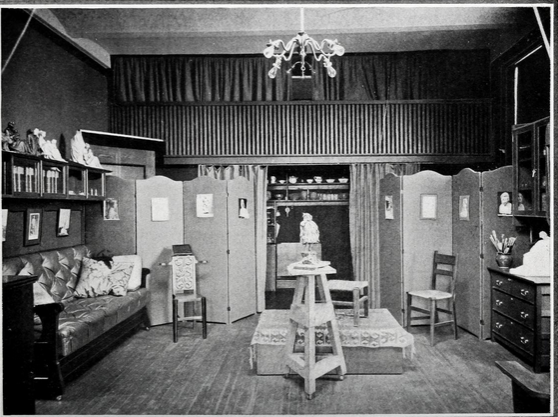
Image No. 16, Studio of Bessie Potter Vonnoh in 1903

Each of the apartments in the square extension had a small studio with a north-facing window. Unlike the large studios, these had the same twelve-foot ceiling height in all rooms. They came in two basic floor plans. The larger of the two measured 18 1/2 by 20 feet and had a second north-facing bedroom adjoining its studio. The smaller one had a bedroom on its south side with an east-facing window. They had bathrooms with toilets but because they had no kitchens or cooking facilities, the building had a kitchen and dining room in the basement for the use of all residents. The Architectural Record article of 1903 reproduced a photograph of one of the small studios. Taken from the entrance to the studio, it showed the north wall with a window about half the height of the windows in the large studios. Its occupant, who was one of the building's architects, B.H. Simonson, had decorated it as a parlor complete with piano. See Image No. 14 The artist Frank Vonnoh and his artist wife sculptor Bessie Potter Vonnoh had leased two of the smaller studios and combined them into one. Architectural Record printed photos of both units. The photo of his showed it to be one of the larger units. The photo of hers, one of the smaller ones, displayed a sculptural work in progress. See Images Nos. 15 and 16.

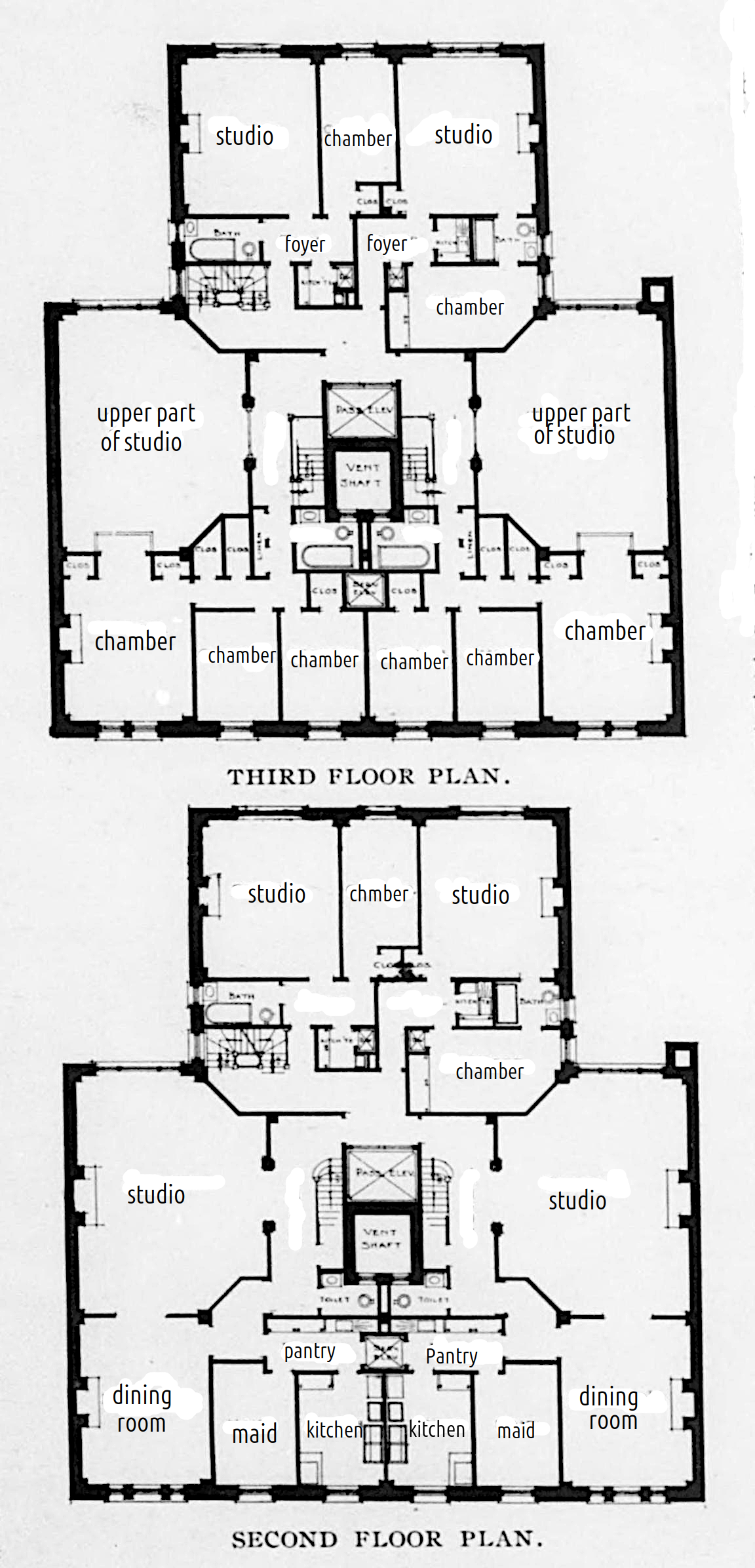
Image No. 17, Floor Plan, 2nd and 3rd floors, 1912

In 1912 Brickbuilder magazine gave a floor plan of the building. It showed the two large studios and both the upper and lower levels of their adjoining duplex apartments. It also showed two floors of small studios in the square extension in both the two-room and single-room versions. The plan listed as "chamber" the rooms that other sources called bedrooms and as "maid" the rooms that other sources called study or library. See Image No. 17.

The duplex apartments of the large studios were big enough for artists with small families while the small single-floor studios were expected to be what were then called bachelor apartments. An article in Harper's published at the time the building opened, noted that the bachelor apartments would be rented either to women or men, "the Studio Building being chaperoned, as it were, by the artists' wives and families."

== Building construction ==
The architects' plans were completed in May 1901 and the builder had begun to put out requests for subcontractor bids in July. Despite what The New York Times called the usual delays, and after a suspicious fire caused a further delay, the building was ready to receive its first owner-occupants as early as March 1903. Reporting on this event, a reporter wrote: "Elevators whiz, and lifts that serve the little kitchens crawl up and down. Heads appear at the windows to catch a glimpse of Central Park nearby or the distant hills of Jersey. There is bustle and rejoicing that, after all these setbacks, the building can be occupied before Summer sends the artists flying out of town."

Early estimates had put the cost of construction as low as $125,000, $150,000, or $170,000. Later, a figure of $350,000 was named, and in the end the total was said to be $400,000.

== Reception ==
In 1903 a reporter praised both the "great ingenuity" in design that solved both the "problem of giving each apartment a well-lighted studio large or small" and the "Chinese puzzle" of compact living spaces that produced "here a corridor, there kitchen, yonder a tiny tile-clad bathroom." The duplex apartments might not be ideal living spaces, the reporter said, "but so far as the practical things are concerned, light, and modern conveniences, there is no stint." A report in Harper's published soon after the building opened praised the modern appliances and "cozy, homelike atmosphere" of the living spaces and said the "decorative scheme throughout the building" would be one of its most attractive features. This writer also noted a "magnificent view" from the building's upper floors, Central Park to its east and the Hudson River to its west. In concluding, the writer said the building was "a very practical step forward in art, one that might well be imitated by artists in all our large cities."

A lengthy review, published in the issue of Architectural Record for October 1903, called the studios "spacious, airy, and excellently lighted" and the living spaces "compact and convenient". It said the entrance hall and other public spaces showed "economic simplicity", free of spurious decoration. A review in Real Estate Record, published a few months later, praised Ranger's "ingenious plan" for duplex apartments that took advantage of "every inch of available space."

A news report in 1907 described the building's advantages some three-and-a-half years after it opened. The journalist wrote: "All the conveniences of modern building have been introduced into this apartment house, and only the best of materials were put into the building. That at once strikes the attention on entering the place. Everything seems so good and so substantial, but so simple and quiet-toned, and in every way different from the usual apartment house."

Although a reporter for The New York Times said the facade was "tall and bulky and sad... not a thing of beauty", other journalists generally praised the visual appeal of the new building. One said the structure had "many beauties". Without explanation, one news piece said the building was dubbed "The Brewery" when it opened. A few years later another writer was impressed with what he called "a beautiful building", pleasantly unlike "the usual ornate gaudy apartment house where so many New Yorkers are doomed to live". A modern writer said the entrance was "heavy-browed" and "rather imposing with the address carved into shields and a magnificent art glass lamp with tendril-like supports on a purposely undressed stone base". Another said the facade was "notable" for its Gothic detail and for "the sophistication of its molded brick windows"

== Owners and tenants ==
In the first few months of its operation, the 67th Street studio building was home to 15 artist-residents. (Note: The first artist-residents whose presence can be documented in contemporary sources were Louis P. Dessar, Frank V. DuMond, Helen Savier DuMond, Charles Graham, Childe Hassam, Charles F. Naegele, William H. Ranger, Walter Russell, Robert Van Vorst Sewell, Amanda Brewster Sewell, Sydney A. Smith, Allen Butler Talcott, Jules Turcas, Robert W. Vonnoh, and Bessie Potter Vonnoh.) Ten of them were stockholders and, of these, two were accompanied by wives who were also artists. (Note: The wives were Helen Savier DuMond and Amanda Brewster Sewell, who were also artists.) During those first few months, another husband-wife pair and an unmarried artist moved in as renters. (Note: They were Robert Vonnoh and his wife Bessie Potter Vonnoh and Charles Graham.) Five of the 15 were tonalists, trained in the Barbizon style of landscape painting. (Note: Residents who painted landscapes in the Barbizon/tonalist style included Henry Ward Ranger, Allen Butler Talcott, Frank DuMond, Jules Turcas, and Howard Logan Hildebrandt.) The other artists were impressionists, portraitists, and genre painters. Thirteen of the studio building's first artist-residents were associated with the National Academy of Design as members or exhibitors. (Note: Academy members: Louis Dessar, Frank DuMond and his wife Helen Lydia Savier, Childe Hassam, Henry Ranger, Robert Van Vorst Sewell and his wife Amanda Brewster Sewell, Allen Butler Talcott, Robert Vonnoh, and Bessie Potter Vonnoh. Academy exhibitors: Charles F. Naegele, Allen Butler Talcott, and Jules Turcas. Six of the first artist-residents did not have close Academy ties: Charles Graham, Edward Naegele, Walter Russell, Sydney A. Smith, Allen Butler Talcott, and Jules Turcas.) Altogether, from the time it opened until 1950, 46 residents were members of the academy. Nine of the first artist-residents were members of the Lyme Art Association, a group in which tonalists, impressionists, and portraitists predominated. (Note: First artist-residents who were members of the Lyme Art Association: Louis P. Dessar, Frank and Helen DuMond, Hassam, William H. Ranger, Allen B. Talcott, Jules Turcas, and the two Vonnohs.)

Notable artists who lived in the studio building between 1903 and 1995 include portraitist Ivan Olinsky and impressionists Gifford Beal, Breta Longacre, Lillian Genth, Tosca Olinsky, and Henry B. Snell, as well as Polish-American illustrator Władysław T. Benda, painter and memoirist Françoise Gilot, and modernist painters James N. Rosenberg and Xavier Gonzalez,

When it opened, the building had an architect in residence, Benjamin Hustace Simonson, who was a partner in the firm that worked with Ranger to construct the studio building. In time, it would also attract a growing number of other non-artists who appreciated its cultural ambiance and found the studio rooms useful for entertaining guests, holding meetings, and conducting classes. Notable among these residents were short story writer Fannie Hurst, choreographer George Balanchine, Russian-born actress and drama teacher Maria Ouspenskaya, coloratura soprano Amelita Galli-Curci, and ballet dancers Patricia McBride and Jean-Pierre Bonnefoux.

From time to time local news media would mention schools and clubs that operated out of the building's studios. For example, in the 1930s, Maria Ouspenskaya gave drama lessons in hers. In 1905, there was a School of Decorative and Applied Art in another of the studios. The Asiatic Institute had it office in the building in 1917.

In 1905 a brief announcement in The New York Times showed how resident artists used their studios as galleries. In this case the artist, a woman known for her decorated pottery as well as her miniature portraits, had included art owned by collectors as well as works she was offering for sale. Here is the text: "A miniaturist of exceptional cleverness is Miss Harriet R. Strafer, who is holding an exhibition at the Sixty-seventh Street Studios (25 West Sixty-seventh Street) from Monday to Saturday next inclusive. Portraits of a number of prominent people have been lent, to show Miss Strafer's broad yet delicate touch."

== Success leading to more cooperative projects ==
There is in Manhattan a whole block of such apartments that are the embodiments of the practical dream of a group of artists, and the block, because the history of its coming about and because of the dwellers therein, is perhaps the most interesting in the whole of New York. It represents in the first place, a larger number of leading artists than any other one block, and has become a kind of art center and gathering place for leading spirits of the brush and palette. – Brooklyn Daily Eagle, Sunday, July 7, 1907, p 18.

Only a few months after the studio building opened, a reporter for the Real Estate Record and Guide reported that two other studio co-ops would be constructed on the same block. This made the location—later part of the West 67th Street Artists' Colony—more of an "art centre" than any other neighborhood in the city. The first was adjacent on the west side of the studio building (29–33 West 67th Street). Completed in 1905, it was similar in size and appearance but had a more ornate facade. The next, completed in 1907, was the Colonial Studios Building at 39 West 67th Street, whose facade was Renaissance in character rather than neo-Gothic. Both had two-story rear-facing studio windows and both were the same height as the studio building. After a lull in construction occasioned by an economic downturn, a third co-op studio apartment was completed at the east end of the block in 1915. By 1920 studio-apartment buildings had become so popular that an article in Architectural Review could say that there were more non-artist residents than artists in some of them. A report in the Evening Post that year said some studio co-ops had long waiting lists of artists and other professionals and reported instances of owners receiving annual dividends of 23% and of selling their stock at twice their original cost. A report in the New York Tribune, also published that year, said the studio building had "been in successful operation ever since its construction".

In 1907 the corporation managing the studio building reported that it had paid off its mortgage.

== Changes to the building ==
27 West 67th Street is a contributing property to the West 67th Street Artists' Colony Historic District, listed on the National Register of Historic Places in 1984. When, in 1995, the co-op owners of the 67th Street studio building gave it a million-dollar restoration, they changed none of its external features. Owners had made changes to their studio apartments but the exterior brickwork, entrance features, and even the green-painted window frames were intact. At an earlier date the shallow rooftop gables had been taken off, but otherwise photos taken in 2022 showed little discernible change. See Images Nos. 8 and 10.

In 2024 real estate listings for studio apartments described the building much as journalists had done in 1903. They said the apartments had wood-burning fireplaces, oak-paneled dining rooms, and south-facing libraries, bedrooms, and kitchens. They reported that the building was still served by a human-operated elevator. Floor plans showed reconfigured locations of non-bearing walls in a manner similar to the modifications made by the building's first residents. As evidenced by the cost of ownership and demand for its studio apartments, the co-op has continued to thrive in the early years of the 21st century.

== See also ==
- Hotel des Artistes, also within the West 67th Street Artists' Colony
