= Hotel des Artistes =

Building in Manhattan, New York

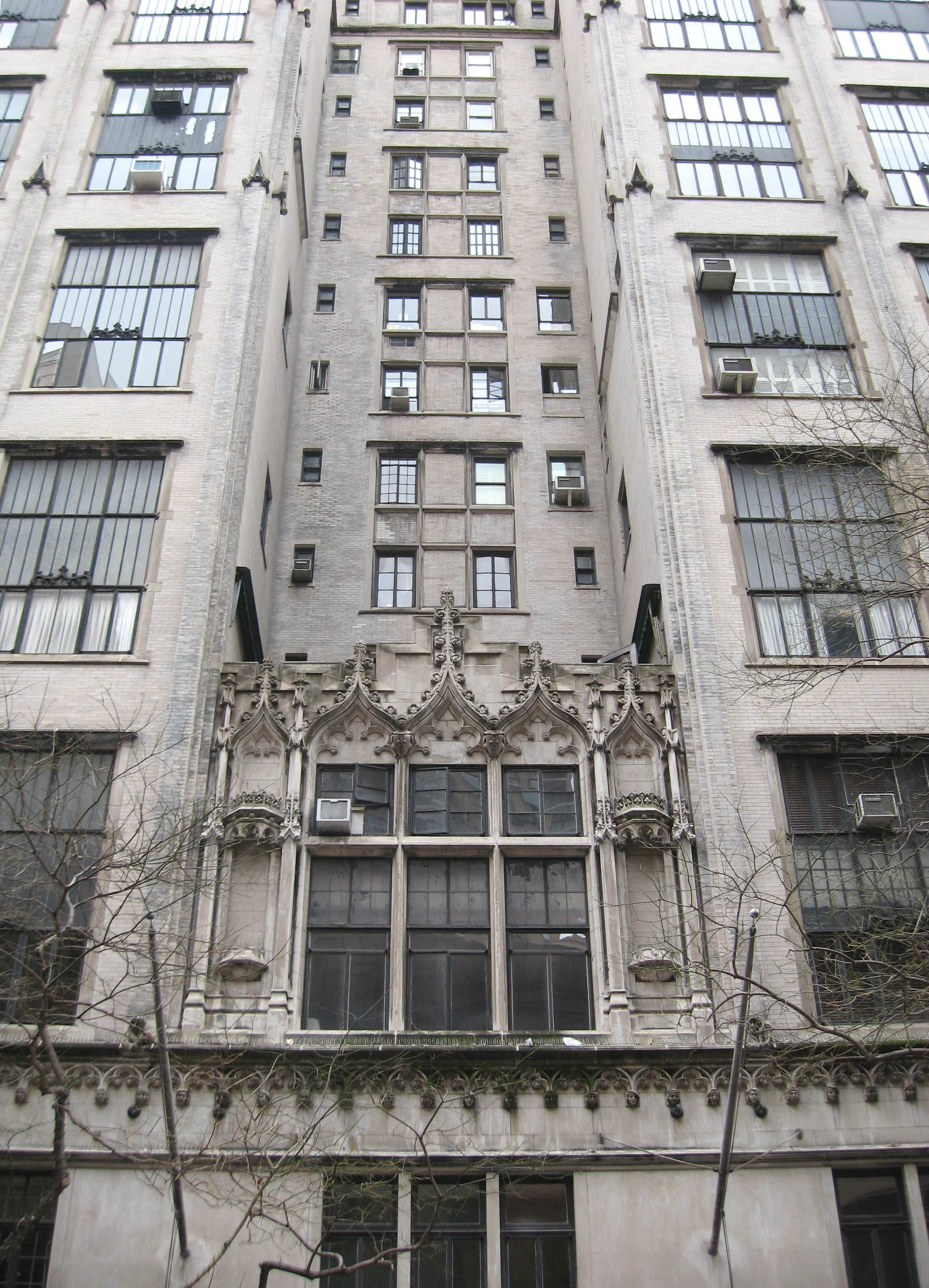

General information
- Location: 1 West 67th Street, Manhattan, New York, US

Design and construction
- Architect: George Mort Pollard
- Hotel des Artistes
- U.S. Historic district – Contributing property
- Coordinates: 40°46′25″N 73°58′44″W
- Part of: West 67th Street Artists' Colony Historic District (ID85001522)
- Added to NRHP: July 11, 1985

Hotel des Artistes is a historic residential building located at 1 West 67th Street, near Central Park West, on the Upper West Side of Manhattan in New York City, United States. Completed in 1917, the ornate 17-story, 119-unit Gothic-style building has been home to a long list of writers, artists, and politicians over the years. It is a contributing property to the West 67th Street Artists' Colony Historic District, listed on the National Register of Historic Places.

== History ==
In 1914, a group of artists—including Walter Russell, Frank DuMond, Willard Metcalf, and Penrhyn Stanlaws—paid $250,000 to buy a parcel of land on the west side of Central Park with the plans of building Hotel des Artistes. At the outset, they planned to erect a 20-story building where 10 stories would be dedicated to artists' studio space and the other 10 would be dedicated to apartments.

Designed by George Mort Pollard, when it opened in 1917, the Hotel des Artistes boasted a large swimming pool, grand ballrooms, rooftop squash courts, a gym, and a restaurant. Apartments had as many as six rooms apiece, and many of the units featured 20-foot lofted ceilings. Kitchens were small, as tenants were able to use their dumbwaiters to receive meals prepared in a kitchen on the second floor. The building is also noted for its pastoral floor-to-ceiling paintings by Howard Chandler Christy, one of its earliest residents.

In 1970, the building transformed into a full co-operative after a new owner purchased it. Several longtime tenants were evicted after a lengthy court battle.

In 1975, violinist turned restaurateur George Lang took over the run-down ground-floor cafe and renovated it, bringing in new diners. Lang and his wife Gloria ran Cafe des Artistes until 2009, when they decided to close it during the recession. In 2011, it reopened under new management as the Leopard at des Artistes. The Leopard closed in 2026 due to significant rent increases for its space.

== Notable residents ==
- Earnest Andersson, who had developed the concept of the Hotel des Artistes, and owned several apartments therein
- Roy Chapman Andrews
- Rolf Armstrong
- Peter Benchley
- Erwin Blumenfeld
- Heywood Broun
- Hugh Carey
- Howard Chandler Christy
- Noël Coward
- Harry Crosby, writer and nephew of J.P. Morgan, killed himself and his mistress, Josephine Bigelow, in the building in 1929.
- Charles Dana Gibson
- Frank DuMond
- Isadora Duncan
- Dean Fausett
- Edna Ferber
- Emil Fuchs
- David Garth
- Peter Gelb
- Paul Goldberger
- Joel Grey
- Elizabeth Hardwick, writer
- Fannie Hurst, novelist, died in her apartment in the building in 1968.
- Ellsworth Kelly
- John Lindsay
- Peter Martins
- Willard Metcalf
- James Montgomery Flagg
- Alla Nazimova
- LeRoy Neiman
- Mike Nichols
- Gary Oldman
- Jean Pigozzi
- Alice Pike Barney
- Zasu Pitts
- Norman Rockwell
- Walter Russell
- Gloria Schiff
- Penrhyn Stanlaws
- Richard Thomas
- Rudolph Valentino
- Margaret Widdemer
- Alexander Woollcott

== In popular culture ==
- Audrey Rose (1977): Hotel des Artistes plays a prominent role in the supernatural drama Audrey Rose. The film's set designers re-created one of the building's apartments on a sound stage in Hollywood.
