= John E. Scharsmith =

American architect

John E. Scharsmith was an American architect of Swiss extraction with a practice in New York City. Having served with a New York regiment in the American Civil War, by the turn of the 20th century, with offices at 1 Madison Avenue, he was responsible for several landmarked apartment blocks in Beaux-Arts style, such as The Hohenzollern, West End Avenue and 84th Street (1902), and The Chatsworth Apartments, 344 West 72nd Street, (1902–04, Annex, 1905–06), and for the eight-story apartment block, 425 West End Avenue, at 72nd Street (1905). He designed the neo-Gothic Swiss House at 37 West 67th Street (1906–07), built for the Swiss Benevolent Society as a home for aged Swiss, one among a group of artists' studio buildings on that block being constructed at the time by various firms.

His office also provided designs for less ambitious projects, such as the Fort Tryon Apartments, northeast corner of St. Nicholas Avenue and 180th Street (for Moersh & Wille, 1907) the pair of 6-story brick and stone apartment houses at the northwest corner of St Nicholas Avenue and 163rd Street and southwest corner of 164th Street (1908) or stables he built on West 151st Street just west of Convent Avenue, for John Quinn (1897). Scharsmith designed the extant block of Renaissance Revival rowhouses at 449-459 Convent Avenue, near 150th Street (1896–97). Some of his other early rowhouses include the nine 3-story brick dwellings 503-519 West 173rd Street near Amsterdam Avenue (1896-1897).
