= Henry Ward Ranger =

American painter (1858–1916)

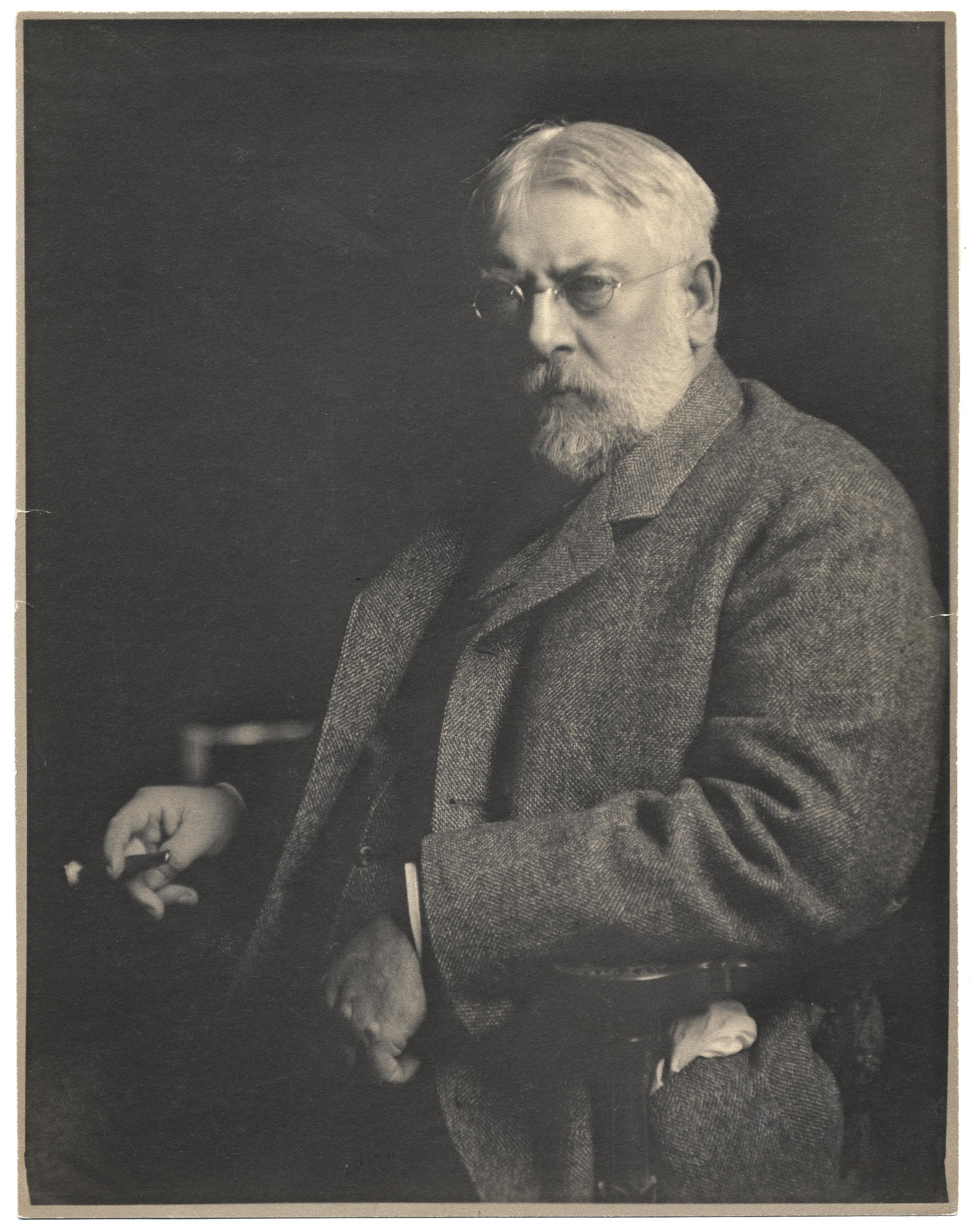
- Henry Ward Ranger, c. 1910
- Born: January 29, 1858; New York State, US
- Died: November 7, 1916 (aged 58)
- Occupation: artist

Henry Ward Ranger (January 29, 1858 – November 7, 1916) was an American artist. Born in western New York State, he was a prominent landscape and marine painter, an important Tonalist, and the leader of the Old Lyme Art Colony. Ranger became a National Academician (1906), and a member of the American Water Color Society. Among his paintings are, Top of the Hill, Corcoran Gallery of Art, Washington, D.C.; and East River Idyll, Carnegie Institute, Pittsburgh, Pennsylvania.

== Early life ==
Henry Ward Ranger was born on January 29, 1858, in New York State. His mother was Martha Marie, and his father Ward Valencourt Ranger. He was born in the rural western part of New York State, most likely in Geneseo and grew up in Syracuse, where his father worked as a commercial photographer, but his father also had some artistic training and later taught drawing. As a young man he studied music, excelling on the piano and organ.

Ranger grew up drawing and painting and received initial encouragement from his parents. After graduating from public school, he studied at Syracuse University for two years, where he studied art formally for the first time. While he worked in his father's photographic business, he began painting watercolor landscapes, which were said to have surprisingly free brush work for someone who had not yet studied abroad. He moved to New York City in 1878 where he saw works of the Barbizon School for the first time. He supported his art studies by reviewing music and theater for several New York newspapers. In 1884, he married an Helen Jennings, a divorced actress with a son.

== Europe ==
The newly formed Ranger family moved to Europe, visiting Paris first, but then settling in Laren, Holland where he became active with the Hague School painters, Jozef Israëls, Anton Mauve and the Maris brothers. Ranger was rapidly adopted by the Dutch painters and he quickly adopted their subjects and way of working. He sketched with the Hague School artists and learned to paint the quickly changing skies of the low counties. Because of the flatness of the land, the skies were important in Hague School paintings, and the cloud-filled skies with their diffused light became characteristic of Ranger's early work. The artist enjoyed living in the modest town, and his work advanced enough to be accepted by the Paris Salons by the late 1880s, and his work was accepted by leading Dutch collectors.

== The United States ==
Ranger set up a New York studio in 1888, so he could paint landscapes there and cultivate American collectors. In 1892, he had a major exhibition of twenty-four paintings at Knoedler Galleries in New York, which received a positive review. He painted watercolors that were considered free and vibrant by critics like Arthur Hoeber. Once back in the United States, Ranger became one of the leaders of the "Tonal" school of painting, and it is he who was given credit for coming up with the name "Tonalist." An exhibition of his paintings at the Lotos Club in the mid-1890s institutionalized the style. In 1894, he had an exhibition at the Macbeth Gallery, the first firm to specialize in the works of American artists. This exhibition included many works that had been done on a sketching trip to Canada. Between 1901 and 1903, Ranger led a syndicate which developed an apartment building at 27 West 67th Street in New York City, the first building in what later became the West 67th Street Artists' Colony.

== Founding of the Old Lyme School ==
Ranger was the first member of the Florence Griswold circle in the Old Lyme Art Colony in Old Lyme, Connecticut. He first stayed at Florence Griswold's boardinghouse in the summer of 1899, perhaps having heard about the area from several colleagues who had summered there and in nearby towns on the Connecticut coast in the 1890s. Inspired by the landscape's resemblance to the Barbizon forest of France, the art colony was established under Ranger's leadership in 1900.

The gathering in Old Lyme was the largest art colony of its time. At Ranger's example, the artists' primary purpose was to make preliminary studies while working directly from nature, with the further intent that the paintings' surfaces be texturally interesting. Then, in emulation of the Old Masters, Ranger and his followers added layers of golden-brown glazes to finish their works, in order to "acquire the tonal expression of a subject."

The ascendance of Tonalism in Old Lyme was truncated when Childe Hassam joined the colony in 1903, and with his arrival Impressionism became the dominant manner of the artists painting there." In 1904 Ranger moved twenty miles east to Noank, where he continued to paint forest interiors and coastal scenes, though with a palette that increasingly suggested the influence of Impressionism.

== Legacy ==
Immediately after his death, Ranger's work continued to bring good prices. When his estate was auctioned off in 1917, 129 paintings sold for $66,240; the New York Times claimed it was the highest average price paid for the works of a dead artist.

Ranger's artistic legacy has been problematic. Once considered the leader of the 'Tonal School', his reputation declined precipitously in the 1930s. That he was heavily influenced by the Hague School, the Barbizon School and the Venetian Renaissance helped to account for some of his most vibrant painterly characteristics, yet it also marked Ranger's work as among the most conservative examples of the Tonalist movement. The Tonalism of Old Lyme came to be viewed as anachronistic, and Ranger's stock suffered as a result.

Recent reassessment has restored credit to Ranger, as "an artist whose influence is not generally understood and whose work has been neglected far too long." In his best landscapes there is "an emotion visible in the molten forces bubbling up from his surfaces in thick impastos, luscious and rich with jewel-like tone, a painterly approximation of the underlying powers constantly transforming the natural world."

A successful businessman, Ranger made a bequest to the National Academy of Design, allocating between $250,000 and $400,000. Ranger's gift allowed the National Collection, now the Smithsonian American Art Museum, to purchase major works by American artists.

== Gallery ==
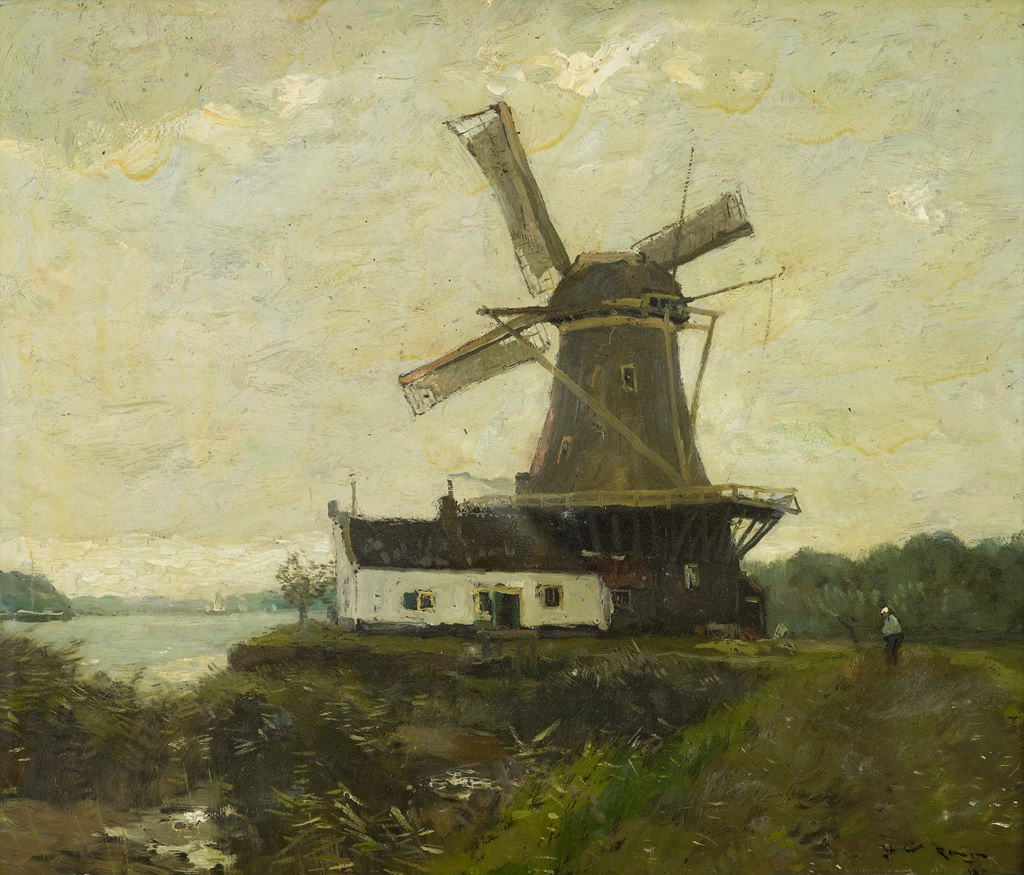
The Windmill

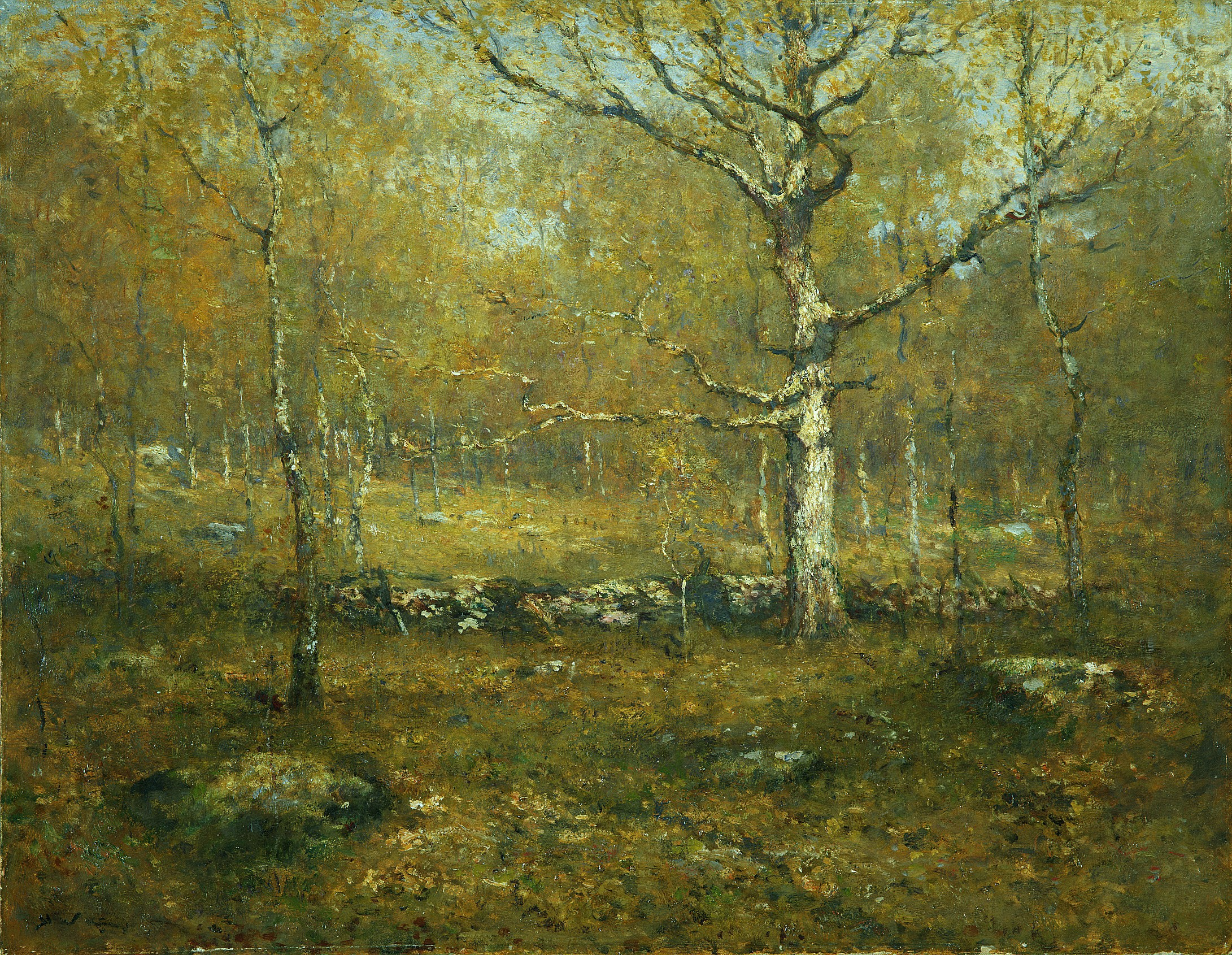
Spring Woods

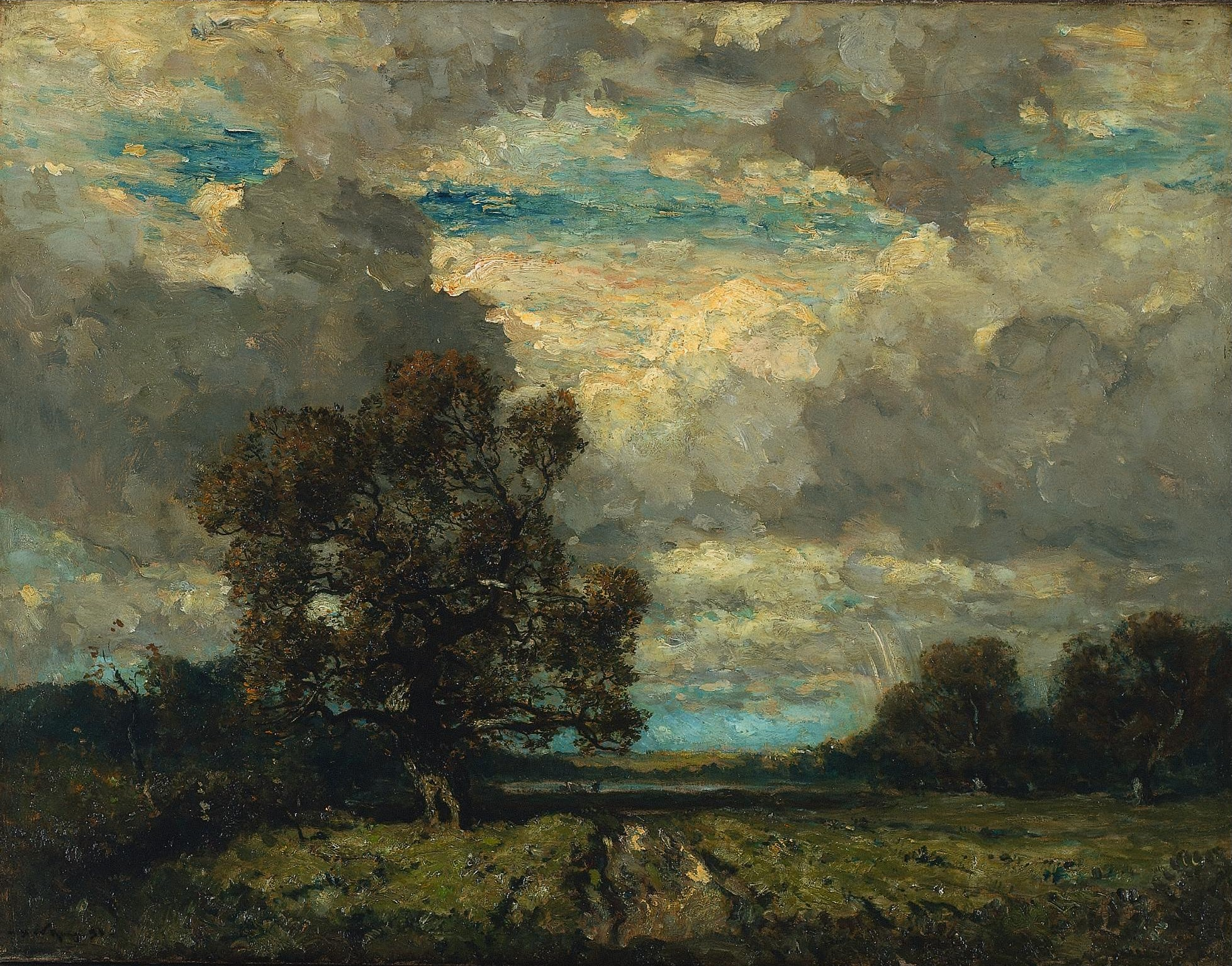
The Lone Sentinel

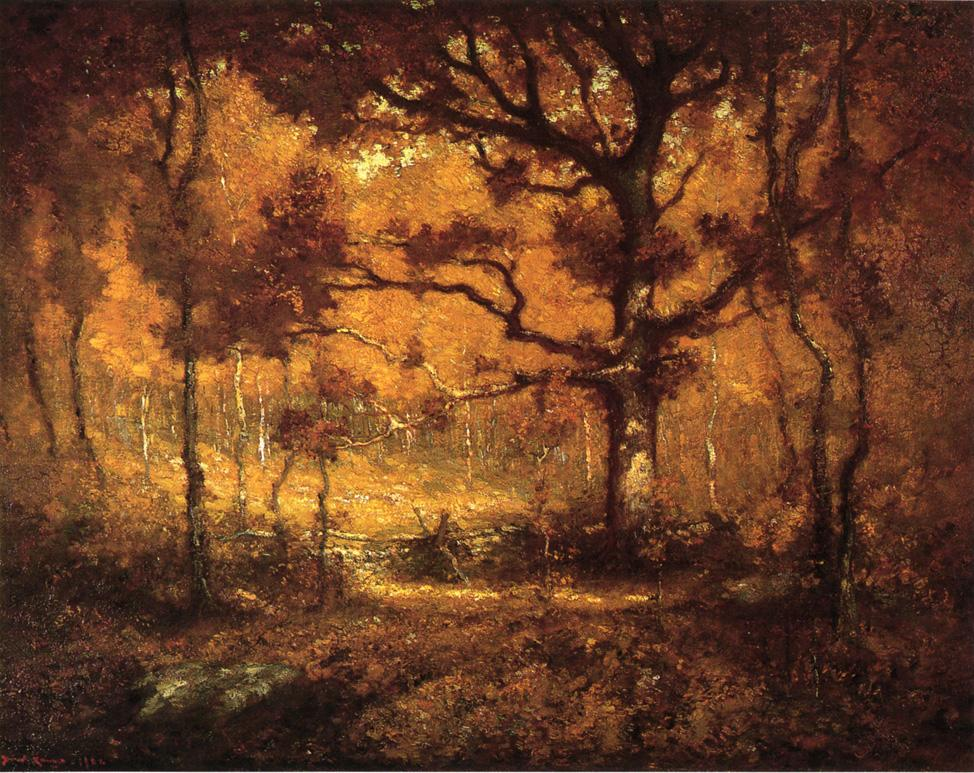
Autumn Woodlands

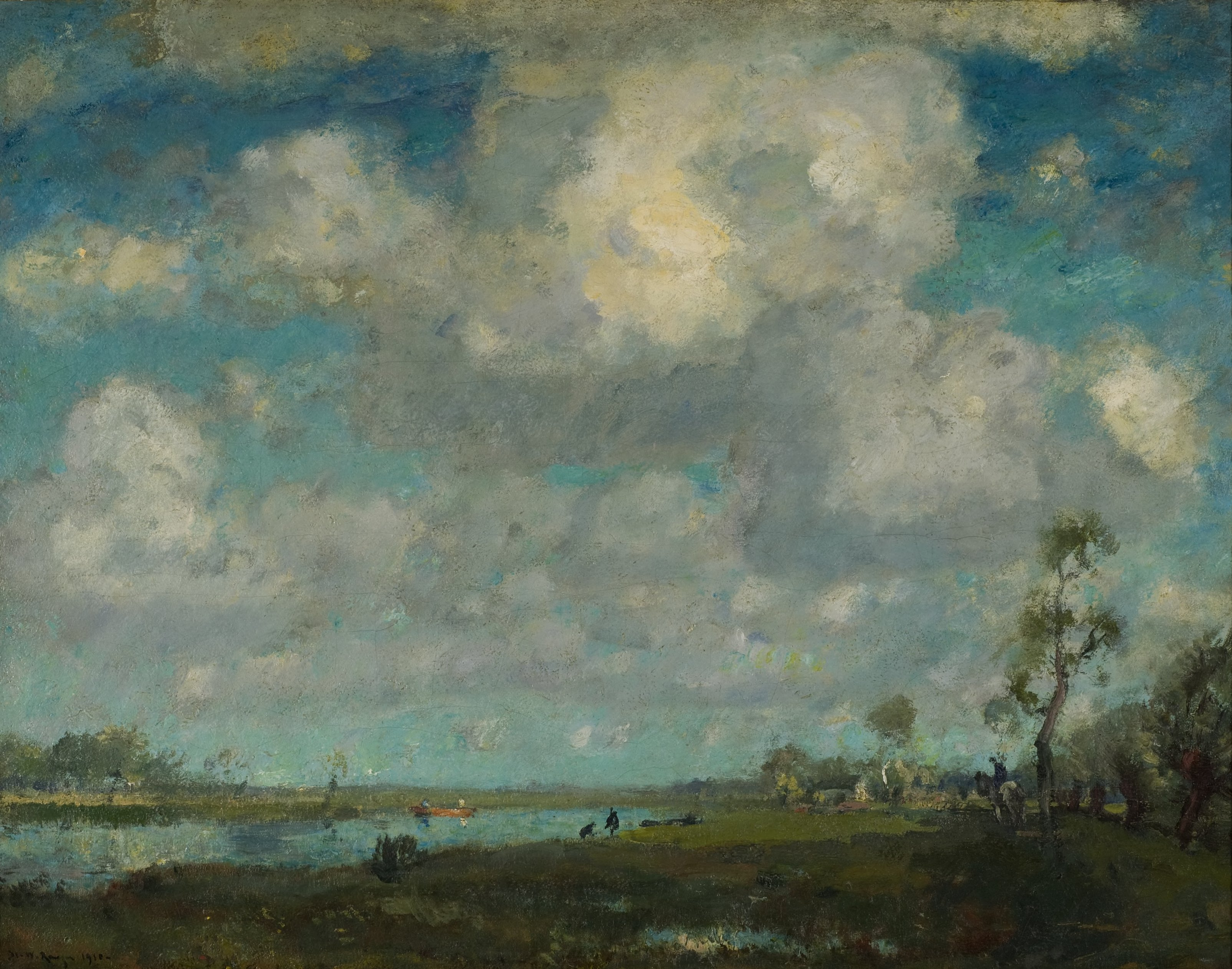
Groton Long Point

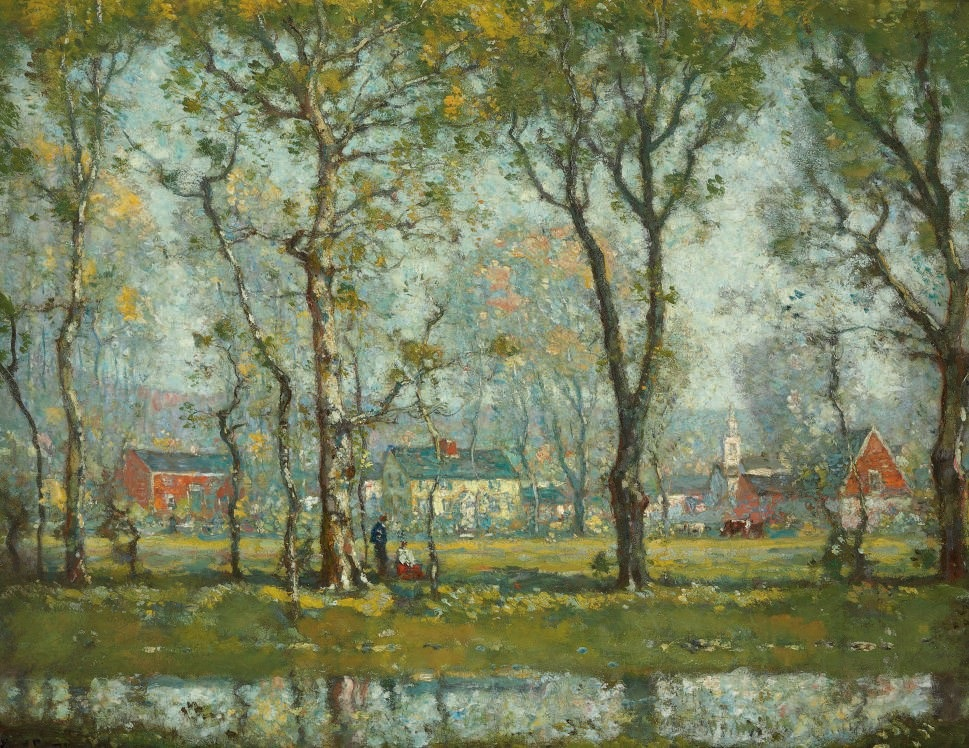
New England Village

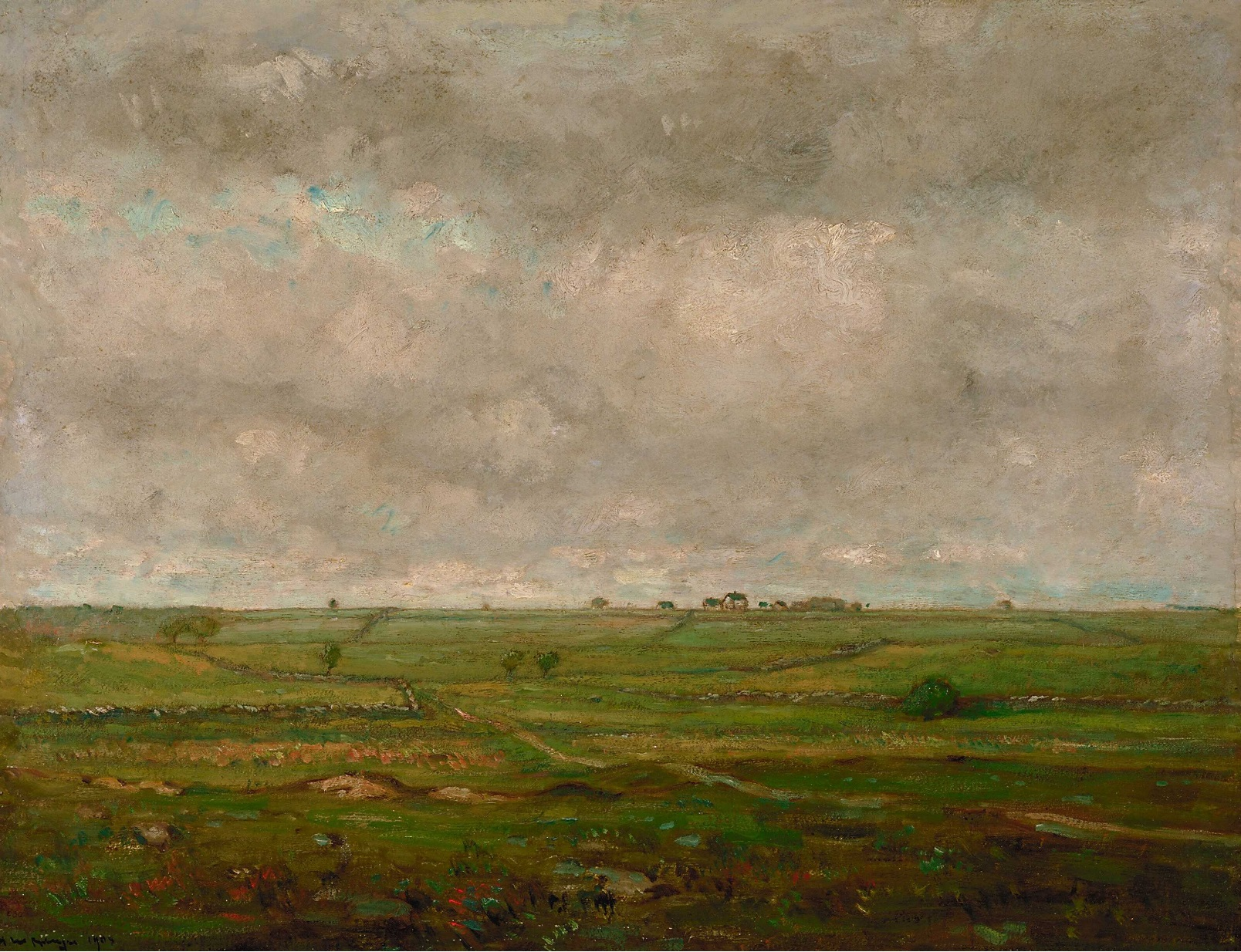
Landscape (1909)

== See also ==
- Tonalism
- California Tonalism
- American Impressionism
- Pictorialism
- Barbizon school
- Paul Dougherty (artist)
- American Barbizon school

== Sources ==
- Anderson, Jeffrey, The American Barbizon, Florence Griswold Museum, Old Lyme, Connecticut, 1982
- Becker, Jack, Henry Ward Ranger and the Humanized Landscape, Lyme Historical Society, 1999, foreword by Jeffrey Anderson
- Bermingham, Peter, American Art in the Barbizon Mood. London and Chicago: University of Chicago Press, 1976.
- Cleveland, David A. A History of American Tonalism: 1880-1920, Hudson Hills Press, Manchester, Vermont, 2010 ISBN 978-1-55595-302-7
- Cleveland, David, Intimate Landscapes: Charles Warren Eaton and the Tonalist Movement in American Art, 1880–1920, Groton School, 2004
- Corn, Wanda M., The Color of Mood: American Tonalism, 1880–1910, M. H. de Young Memorial Museum, 1972
- Dougherty, Paul, "The Art of Henry Ward Ranger", Brush and Pencil, Vol. XVI, No. 2, August 1905
- Riback, Estelle, The Intimate Landscape: A New Look at the Origins of the American Barbizon Movement, Lost Coast Press, Ft. Bragg, California, 2004
- Riback, Estelle, Modulator of Harmonious Color, Lost Coast Press, Ft. Bragg, California, 2000
- Rosenfeld, Daniel & Workman, Robert G., The Spirit of Barbizon: France and America, Art Museum Association of America, San Francisco, California, 1986
