= Mortimer Lichtenauer =

American painter

Joseph Mortimer Lichtenauer
- Born: May 11, 1876; New York, New York, United States
- Died: March 30, 1966 (aged 89); Firenze, Italy
- Occupation: Painter

Mortimer Lichtenauer (May 11, 1876 – May 30, 1966) was an American painter. His work was part of the painting event in the art competition at the 1932 Summer Olympics.

== Biography ==
Joseph Mortimer Lichtenauer, portrait painter, muralist, sculptor and art collector, was born in New York City on May 11, 1876 from Joseph Mortimer Lichtenauer, an investment advisor, and Rebecca Deutsch. He studied at the Art Students League with Henry Siddons Mowbray before moving to Paris where he entered the Académie Julian. There he studied under Luc-Olivier Merson, Jean-Joseph Benjamin-Constant and Jean-Paul Laurens and met Cadwallader Washburn, Louis Vaillant, and Carolus-Duran. He usually frequented the American club with Henry Ossawa Tanner of Pennsylvania and joined the American Art Association in 1898. In the following years he lived in New York, married Giulia de Ghira and, after her death, married Irma Lena Kaufman on November 24, 1909. Lichtenauer and Kaufman lived in New York's Central Park Studios at 15 West 67th Street and then 154 West 55th Street. He travelled a great deal living also in Italy and Florence in particular where he died on March 30, 1966. His remains were cremated and his ashes deposited in the "American Church" St. James Episcopal Church, Via Bernardo Rucellai 13, Florence and a cenotaph is present at Lichtenauer family plot at Mount Pleasant Cemetery Hawthorne. A muralist as well, Lichtenauer painted the ceiling of the Shubert Theater in New York City and created murals for the Adelphi Theatre, and Washington Irving High School. He also created a series of panels for the Washington Bi-Centennial. Lichtenauer was also a member of the Salmagundi Club and the American Federation of the Arts. As art collector he made a gift to Metropolitan Museum of Art of some drawings by Cristoforo Roncalli and Giuseppe Cesari. In his career he won many medals, among which we can remember the bronze medal for a sketch for a mural painting illustrating the “ Glorification of the City of New York" and an other bronze medal in 1937 for the "Javanese". His works may be found in the Smithsonian American Art Museum, Brooklyn Museum and the Metropolitan Museum of Art.

== Artwork ==
Lichtenauer was a pupil of academic painters. He studied classic art for many years in Italy, where he also lived. His works are notable for his represention of detail. Influences from classical Greek art can be identified along with symbolism from the Art Nouveau movement. His use of brushstrokes and bright colors is also a hallmark of his work. He was also known to use thick layers of paint applied with a palette knife.

His best known work decorates the Shubert theater. It consists of a series of painted panels adorning the seating boxes, the area above the proscenium arch, and the ceiling. This work includes figures with renaissance-inspired masks and semi-nude females, who are thought to represent art forms such as music and drama.

== Works ==
- Portrait of General John Julius Stahel, oil on canvas, 1917, Smithsonian American Art Museum
- Two Nudes, Graphite and pastel on paper, Brooklyn Museum.
- Studies of female figures, crayon on paper, signed and dated 1926, Metropolitan Museum of Art.
- Mother and child, Oil on canvas. Signed and dated 1919.
- Portrait of a seated female figure in Japanese dress, oil on canvas, about 1920.
- And They Shall Beat Their Swords into Plow Shares, Signed, mixed media on board.
- Portrait of Mrs. Guild, oil on panel.
- Bronze, with foundry mark "OFIR/Gorham Co. Foundries, signed.
- Still life with figurines, Oil on canvas, 1965.
- "Javanesque (Javanese)" Pastel and graphite on brown paper, signed and dated 1937.
