= Charles Graham (artist) =

American painter and illustrator (1852–1911)

- Born: 1852; Rock Island, Illinois, U.S.
- Died: August 9, 1911 (aged 58–59); New York City, New York, U.S.
- Known for: Landscape painting

Charles S. Graham (1852 – August 9, 1911) was an American artist whose work featured in nearly every issue of Harper's Weekly from 1880 to 1893. During this period he was one of the most well-known artists in the United States.

== Biography ==
Charles S. Graham was born in Rock Island, Illinois in 1852. In the early 1870s, he worked as a topographer for the Northern Pacific Railway in Idaho and Montana. Despite receiving no formal training as an artist, he was hired as a scenic artist for Hooley's Theater in Chicago. He then continued this work at several theaters in New York City. Around 1877, he joined Harper & Brothers and became an illustrator for Harper's Weekly, touring and illustrating the American West. He toured the Southern United States in 1886, illustrating a series of articles for Harper's on the New South. In 1892, he became a freelancer, though he continued to contribute to Harper's, along with The Century Magazine, Collier's and the New York Herald. Around this time his method shifted from pencil drawing and watercolor painting to oil painting. He was designated the official artist of the World's Columbian Exposition in Chicago in 1893. Graham died in New York City on August 9, 1911.
