= David Garth =

American political consultants

David Garth (born David Lawrence Goldberg; March 5, 1930 – December 15, 2014) was an American political advertising consultant to first Democratic and later Republican office seekers initially in the State of New York and its largest municipality, New York City, though later his reach would extend to races in Connecticut and New Jersey as well. He was a pioneer in the use of cinéma vérité for campaign spots.

David Lawrence Goldberg was born in Crown Heights, Brooklyn, New York City, on March 5, 1930.

Garth was famed for promoting non-household names to underdog wins. His first major triumph in the form of an election victory came in 1965, when John Lindsay was chosen to become the next Mayor of New York City.

In 1977 he helped to engineer the victory of Ed Koch over Mario Cuomo in the race for the office of the Mayor of New York City. The New York Times, which outed Koch as homosexual in May 2022, said that during the campaign, Garth asked a friend of Koch, Ethan Geto, "Is [Koch] a fag? ... If that son of a bitch lied to me and he's a fag, I would never have taken him on."

In 1981 he took part in Menachem Begin's reelection campaign for the role of the Prime Minister of Israel.

Later he was instrumental in two subsequent multiple term ballot box victories for Mayor of New York City; first by a Republican, Rudy Giuliani, and then by a Republican who later switched over to an independent affiliation party status, Michael Bloomberg. Garth also worked on gubernatorial campaigns of Ella Grasso in Connecticut and Brendan Byrne in New Jersey.

Garth died on December 15, 2014, in New York City.
