= George Lang (restaurateur) =

Hungarian born American restaurateur

- György Deutsch
- Born: July 13, 1924; Hungary
- Died: July 5, 2011 (aged 86)

George Lang (born György Deutsch; July 13, 1924 – July 5, 2011) was a Hungarian–born American restaurateur, food and travel writer, critic, and journalist.

== Life ==
Lang was the only child of Simon Deutsch, a tailor, and Ilona Láng. He grew up in this "modestly prosperous" Jewish family in Székesfehérvár, Hungary, where he practiced violin. After Germany occupied Hungary, and Döme Sztójay took over as prime minister in March 1944, György was ordered into a labor camp; both his parents later were murdered in Auschwitz, but György escaped within six months. In order to survive, he hid his identity and joined the pro-Nazi Arrow Cross, in which he served for three months before he was discovered. Soviet forces occupied Budapest before he could be executed, however. Although he was tried for war crimes as an Arrow Cross member and was acquitted, but "Europe was finished for him." He changed his name (Deutsch means 'German'), taking his mother's maiden name, and moved to the United States in 1946 with his cousin Évi. He settled in New York the same year.

Lang worked in the restaurant business in New York as a chef, a banquet manager, then as developer of new projects for Restaurant Associates, a pioneering company that created The Four Seasons Restaurant and other innovative eateries. He began working at the Waldorf Astoria Hotel in 1955 after a period working in the Bowery, where he had run a wedding banquet hall, mainly for Italian Americans. On December 13, 1955, he helped organize the American Theatre Wing's First Night Ball to celebrate Helen Hayes's 50th year in show business. He also did his best to organize dinners at the Waldorf to assist Hungarian issues and relief. On one occasion, an event was attended by the likes of Edward G. Robinson and pianist Doklady and some $60,000 was raised.

Lang spent three years as director of The Four Seasons before starting his own consulting business. He pioneered the profession of restaurant consulting when in 1970 he started the George Lang Corporation. In 1975, Lang was awarded the Hotelman of the Year Award. The same year, he bought the Café des Artistes, a restaurant popular with musicians, journalists, and others. Still, not every venture was successful forever. Café des Artistes closed in 2009 during the Great Recession, after experiencing steadily mounting losses and union troubles. In 1992, along with fellow Hungarian-American Ronald S. Lauder, son of famed cosmetics mogul Estée Lauder, Lang bought and restored the famous Budapest restaurant Gundel.

Lang's autobiography, entitled Nobody Knows the Truffles I've Seen (a reference to the spiritual "Nobody Knows the Trouble I've Seen"), was published by Knopf in 1998. He published several books on food and travel, including the classic reference The Cuisine of Hungary, a 1982 book reissued in 1994 as George Lang's Cuisine of Hungary, and had a stint as a columnist for Travel + Leisure magazine.

Lang married three times, had four children, and was divorced from his first two wives. He was married to the concert pianist, opera singer and actress Doe Lang, born Caplow. Their son Brian Lang is a concert violinist, and their daughter Andrea Lang was a graphic designer. Andrea died in a Santa Barbara wildfire in 1990 while attempting to flee her home.

Lang, who was married to Jenifer Harvey Lang at the time of his death, had been treated for Alzheimer's disease and died at age 86 at his home in Manhattan. He was survived by his first and third wives, his son Brian, and two other children, daughter Georgina and son Simon.

== Sources ==
- Morehouse III, Ward (1991). The Waldorf Astoria: America's Gilded Dream. Xlibris, Corp. ISBN 978-1413465044.
- Matt DeLucia, "George Lang - His Amazing Journey to Café Des Artistes," Restaurant Insider, March 2007.
