= Talcott =

Talcott is both a surname and a given name. Notable people with the name include:

Surname:

- Allen Butler Talcott (1867–1908), American landscape painter
- Andrew Talcott (1797–1883), American civil engineer
- Burt Talcott (1920-2016), American politician and lawyer
- Enoch B. Talcott (1811–1868), New York politician
- George Talcott (1786–1862), American soldier
- James Talcott (1835–1916), American factor
- Joseph Talcott, Governor of Connecticut (1724–41)
- Lucy Talcott (1899–1970), American archaeologist
- Samuel A. Talcott (1789–1836), Attorney General of New York
- Thad M. Talcott (1875–1957), American politician and lawyer

Given name:

- Talcott Parsons, American sociologist
- Talcott Williams Seelye (1922–2006), American diplomat and writer

Place name:

- Talcott, West Virginia
- Talcott Mountain in central Connecticut
