= Senator Talcott =

Senator Talcott may refer to:

- Enoch B. Talcott (1811–1868), New York State Senate
- Thad M. Talcott (1875–1957), Indiana State Senate
