= Mechanics National Bank =

Mechanics National Bank may refer to:

- Mechanics National Bank (Philadelphia), founded 1809
- Mechanics National Bank (New York City), founded 1810
- Mechanics National Bank (New Britain), where Philip Corbin served as Director
