= Senator Bingham =

Senator Bingham may refer to:

== Members of the United States Senate ==
- Hiram Bingham III (1875–1956), U.S. Senator from Connecticut from 1925 to 1933
- Kinsley S. Bingham (1808–1861), U.S. Senator from Michigan from 1859 to 1861
- William Bingham (1752–1804), U.S. Senator from Pennsylvania from 1795 to 1801

== United States state senate members ==
- E. Volney Bingham (1844–1922), Indiana State Senate
- Stan Bingham (born 1945), North Carolina State Senate

== See also ==
- Brian Bingman (born 1953), Oklahoma State Senate
