= James Talcott =

American businessman

- Talcott around 1900
- Born: February 7, 1835; West Hartford, Connecticut, U.S.
- Died: August 21, 1916 (aged 81); Lake Mohonk, New York, U.S.
- Burial place: Cedar Hill Cemetery
- Occupation: Factor
- Spouse: Henrietta E. Francis

Signature
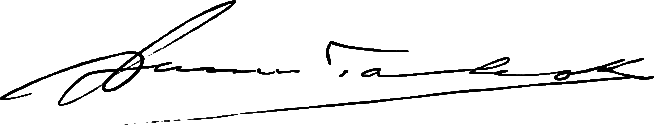

James Talcott (February 7, 1835 – August 21, 1916) was an American factor, based in New York City. He established James Talcott, Inc., one of the oldest and largest 19th-century factoring houses in the United States.

== Early life ==
Talcott was born on a thousand-acre farm in West Hartford, Connecticut, on February 7, 1835. He attended Williston Seminary, where he studied philosophy.

== Career ==
Talcott began his business career in 1854 in New York as a selling agent for a knitting mill in New Britain, Connecticut. The mill was managed by his brother, John Butler Talcott. In 1859, he became a dry goods merchant.

In 1868, Talcott moved his dry goods business into what is now known as the James Talcott Company Building, at 108–110 Franklin Street in Manhattan. His business survived both the Panic of 1857 and Panic of 1873. The business remained at Franklin Street for about fifty years, before moving to Park Avenue in 1911.

Towards the end of the 19th century, Talcott became a textile factor, later branching into coal.

== Personal life ==
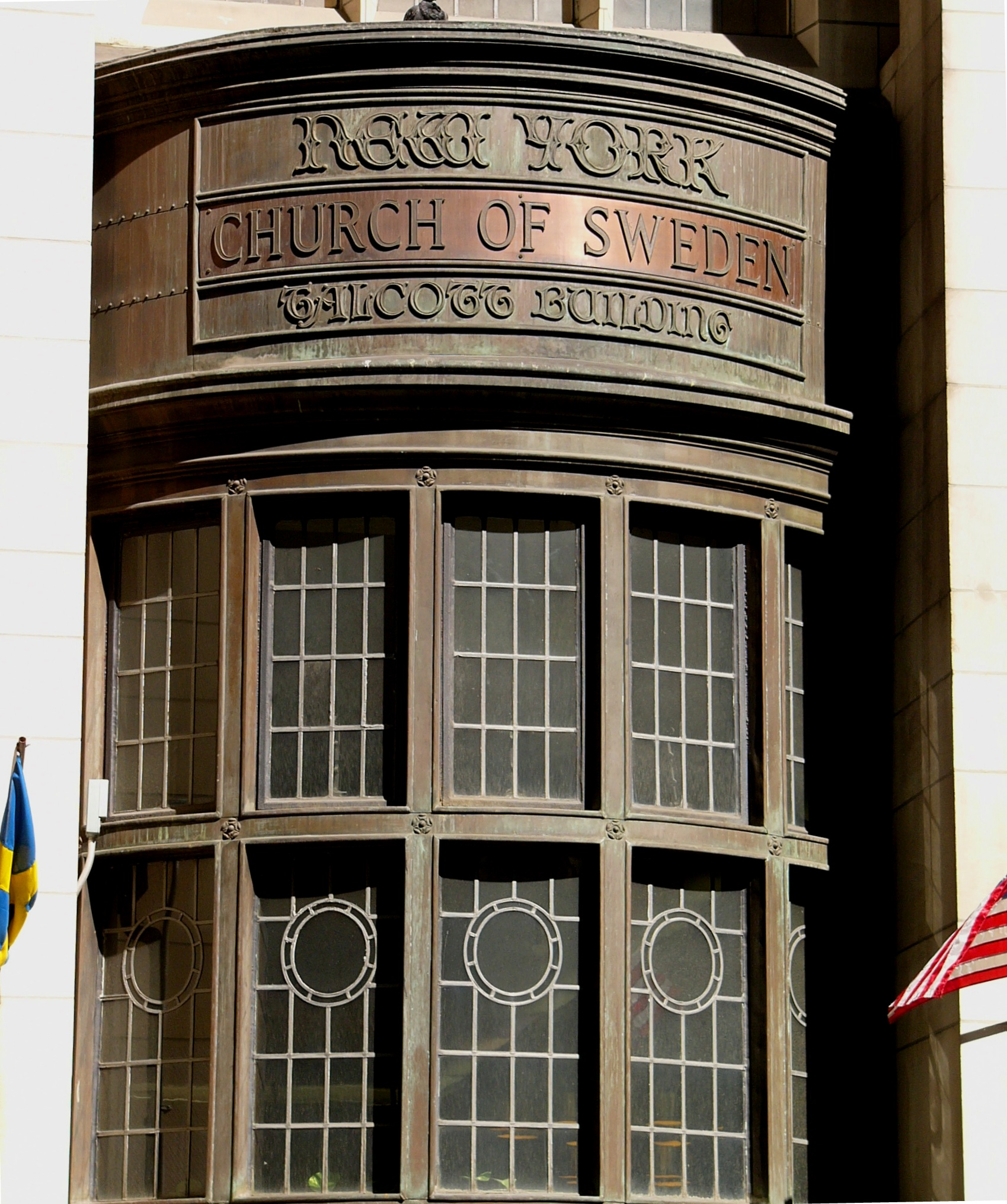
Talcott's name above a window on the Church of Sweden in New York at 5 East 48th Street

He married Henrietta E. Francis, and they had six children: James Frederick, Grace, Francis E., Edith Charlotte, Arthur and Reginald. Only five survived to adulthood.

=== Family ===
Talcott's eldest son, James Frederick (1866–1944), a graduate of Princeton University, joined his father's business full time in 1879. In 1890, he married Frank Vanderbilt Crawford, who was the niece and namesake of Frank Armstrong Crawford Vanderbilt, the second wife of New York railroad businessman Cornelius Vanderbilt.

In the late 1930s, James Frederick's son and James Talcott's grandson, James Talcott Jr. (1893–1983), was an officer of the company. This expansion was necessary, for the company's volume had grown from $11.2 million in 1926 to $82 million a decade later. Nearly a quarter of this volume consisted of refactoring (that is, receivables purchased from other factoring establishments). Talcott Jr. succeeded his father as president of the company upon his death in 1944, having joined in 1916. He became its chairman in the 1950s.

Talcott's nephew was American artist Allen Butler Talcott.

== Death ==
Talcott died at Lake Mohonk, New York, on August 21, 1916, at the age of 86. He was buried in Cedar Hill Cemetery in Hartford.

== Legacy ==
In 1921, Talcott's wife Henrietta made a donation of around $250,000 to the New York Bible Society for a Gothic-style building to be erected in memory of her husband. The new building was the work of architect Wilfred E. Anthony (1878–1948). Henrietta died in December 1921, aged 79; it is not known whether she got to see the finished building. Today, the Church of Sweden in New York occupies the building at 5 East 48th Street.

== Philanthropy ==
Throughout his life, Talcott gave at least ten percent of his income to charity. In addition to his mission work, he funded an arboretum at Mount Holyoke College, a library in West Hartford, a women's dormitory at Oberlin College and a hospital in China.

Along with Dwight L. Moody, Talcott was also a founder and trustee of Northfield Seminary in Massachusetts, and he and his wife funded a professorship at Barnard College. His wife was also a founder of the YWCA, while James was on the international committee of the YMCA.
