= Alfred E. Reinhardt =

American architect

- Born: December 29, 1902; New York City
- Died: March 1987 (aged 84)
- Known for: Architect

Alfred E. Reinhardt (December 1902 - March, 1987) AIA, was an American architect active in mid-twentieth-century Connecticut and Massachusetts. His firm specialized in ecclesiastical design and was very active with Roman Catholic Clients, mostly in Connecticut.

== Early life and architectural training ==
Reinardt was born in 1902 in New York City. He received his architectural training at Cooper Union (2 years), Mechanics Institute (1 year), Columbia University (night course, 2 years), New York Building School (1 year), and Metropolitan Art School (1. Year). He was apprentice for 5 years in the office of Donn Barber and then became a designer for Wilfred E. Anthony. He then worked for McKenna and Irving as head designer for 2.5 years. He served for 1 year as the director of architecture for the Metropolitan Museum of Art, and as an ecclesiastical designer for the Rambusch Decorating Company.

== Architectural practice ==
Eventually he formed his own company located in Glastonbury, Connecticut. In 1958 his firm was relocated to Springfield Massachusetts where he was associated with the firm of Munson, Mallis and Reinhardt. He served as president of the Western Chapter of the AIA. In 1961 his business returned to Connecticut. He was granted Member Emeritus standing with the AIA in 1968.

Many of Reinhardt’s churches were of a round design, rather unusual for the period.

== Works Include ==
- St. Anthony Church, Prospect, Connecticut
- Holy Spirit Church, Newington, Connecticut
- Mary, Our Queen Church, Plantsville, Connecticut
- St.Maurice Church, Bolton, Connecticut
- St. George Church, Guilford, Connecticut
- St. Thomas Aquinas Church, University of Connecticut, Storrs, Connecticut
