= Dudley Talcott =

American sculptor

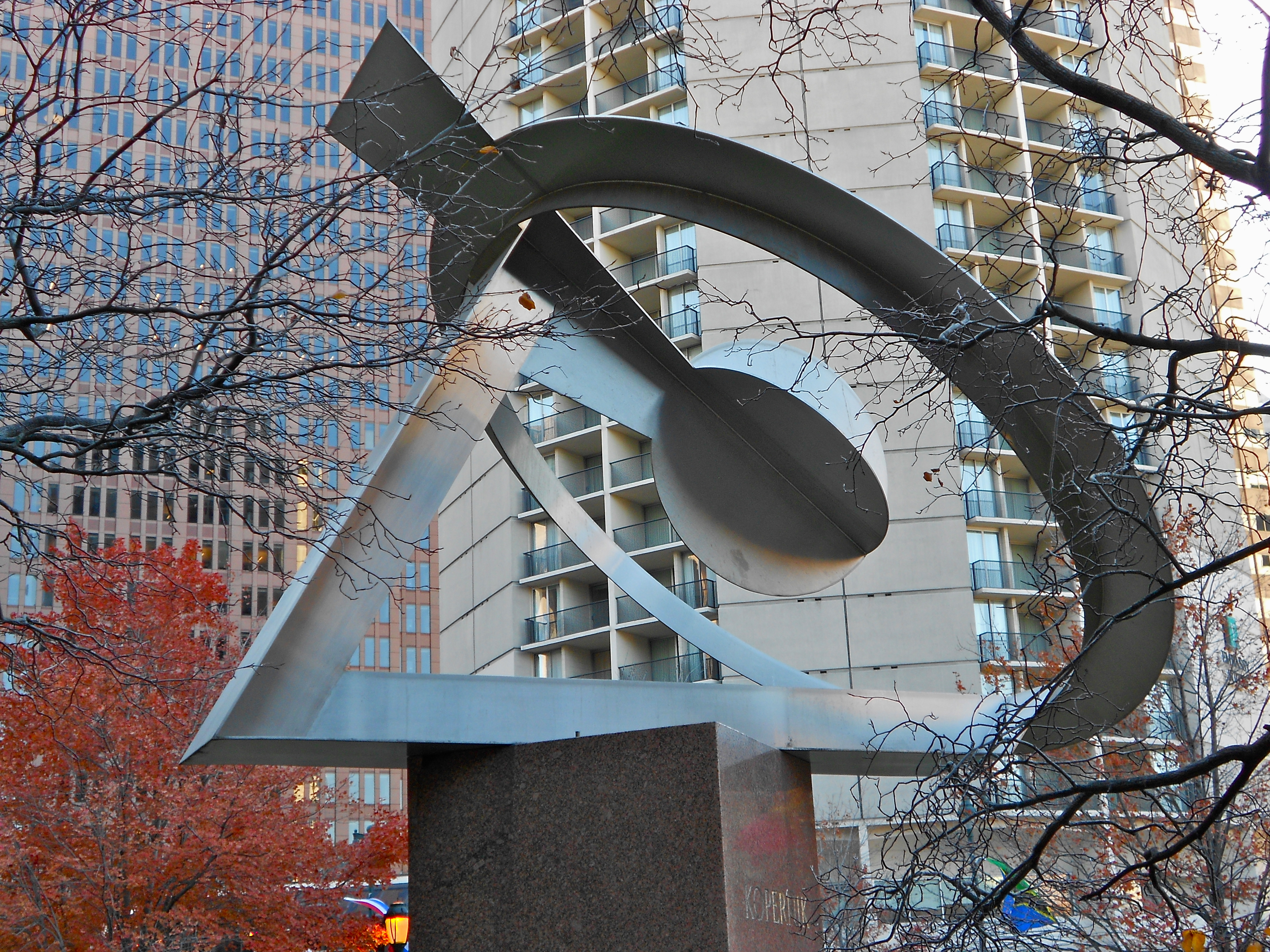
Kopernik in Philadelphia

Dudley Vaill Talcott (June 9, 1899 – February 19, 1986) was an American sculptor, author and illustrator.

He was born in Hartford, Connecticut. Talcott's uncle was Allen Butler Talcott, an American Tonalist and his daughter Jane Allen Talcott is a respected painter.

He studied for one year at Yale University's Art School before moving to Paris in 1920 when he took instruction at the Academié de la Grande Chaumière. in Paris, France.

In 1925 Talcott traveled to Norway where he stayed on and off for six years. From this experience came two books, Noravind (1929) and Report of the Company (1936). He provided the illustrations for both publications. Also in 1936 he published North of North Cape (a.k.a. The Arctic Voyages of the Norkap II) which also featured his drawings. In 1932 he married Martha Isaksen, a Norwegian.

In 1932 sculpture was still an Olympic competition and Talcott had two pieces entered in the Los Angeles games that year. He did not win any medals. For the New York World's Fair of 1939 Talcott produced "panels, figures, etc.".

In 1973 he produced a work Kopernik to commemorate the 500th anniversary of the birth of the Polish astronomer Nicholas Copernicus that is located on Benjamin Franklin Parkway in Philadelphia, Pennsylvania. Talcott died in 1986 in Farmington, Connecticut.
