= Henrietta E. Francis Talcott =

American philanthropist (1842 - 1921)

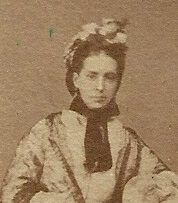
- Born: June 23, 1842; Bridgehampton, New York, US
- Died: December 14, 1921 (aged 79); New York City, US
- Known for: Philanthropist and founder of the YWCA and Barnard College
- Spouse: James Talcott

Henrietta E. Francis Talcott (June 23, 1842 – December 14, 1921) was a philanthropist, a founder of the YWCA and an original trustee of Barnard College. Much of her work was devoted to charity for various 19th and 20th century religious and educational institutions that provided support for women of faith.

== Early life ==
Francis was the daughter of Amzi Francis, a minister of the Bridgehampton Presbyterian Church from 1822 to 1845. She married textile merchant James Talcott of Hartford, Connecticut, in 1861 and they had six children: James Frederick, Grace, Francis E., Edith Charlotte, Arthur and Reginald. Only five survived to adulthood. They lived at 7 West 57th Street in Manhattan.

== Women and education ==
In her 20s, Talcott served as Vice President of the Ladies Christian Union when it was first organized in 1870. When she was 31, she became a charter member of the YWCA, which was founded in 1873. In 1889, when she was 47, she was one of eleven female trustees who helped launch the creation of a sister college of Columbia. Her fellow female trustees included Frances Fisher Wood, suffragist Annie Nathan Meyer, Laura Spelman Rockefeller, socialite and artist Caroline Dutcher Sterling Choate and Ella Weed, the first dean of the women's institution. Talcott remained a trustee until her death in 1921, aged 79, having serving for 32 years.

== Philanthropy ==
Her many large gifts to education and religion included $100,000 to Barnard for the endowment of a chair in Bible study, and $250,000 for the new building of the New York Bible Society at No. 5 West 48th Street which opened in 1921, as a memorial to her husband. The building still stands today and is the home of the Church of Sweden in New York.

Talcott engaged her daughter Grace and her daughter-in-law Frank in many of her charitable pursuits. She helped found the Bible and Fruit Mission in 1900, serving as its president and Grace was a founding member. Frank served as treasurer.
