= Walter Thür Organbuilders =

Swedish organ building company

- Founded: 1968
- Defunct: 2014
- Headquarters: Torshälla, Sweden
- Products: Pipe Organs

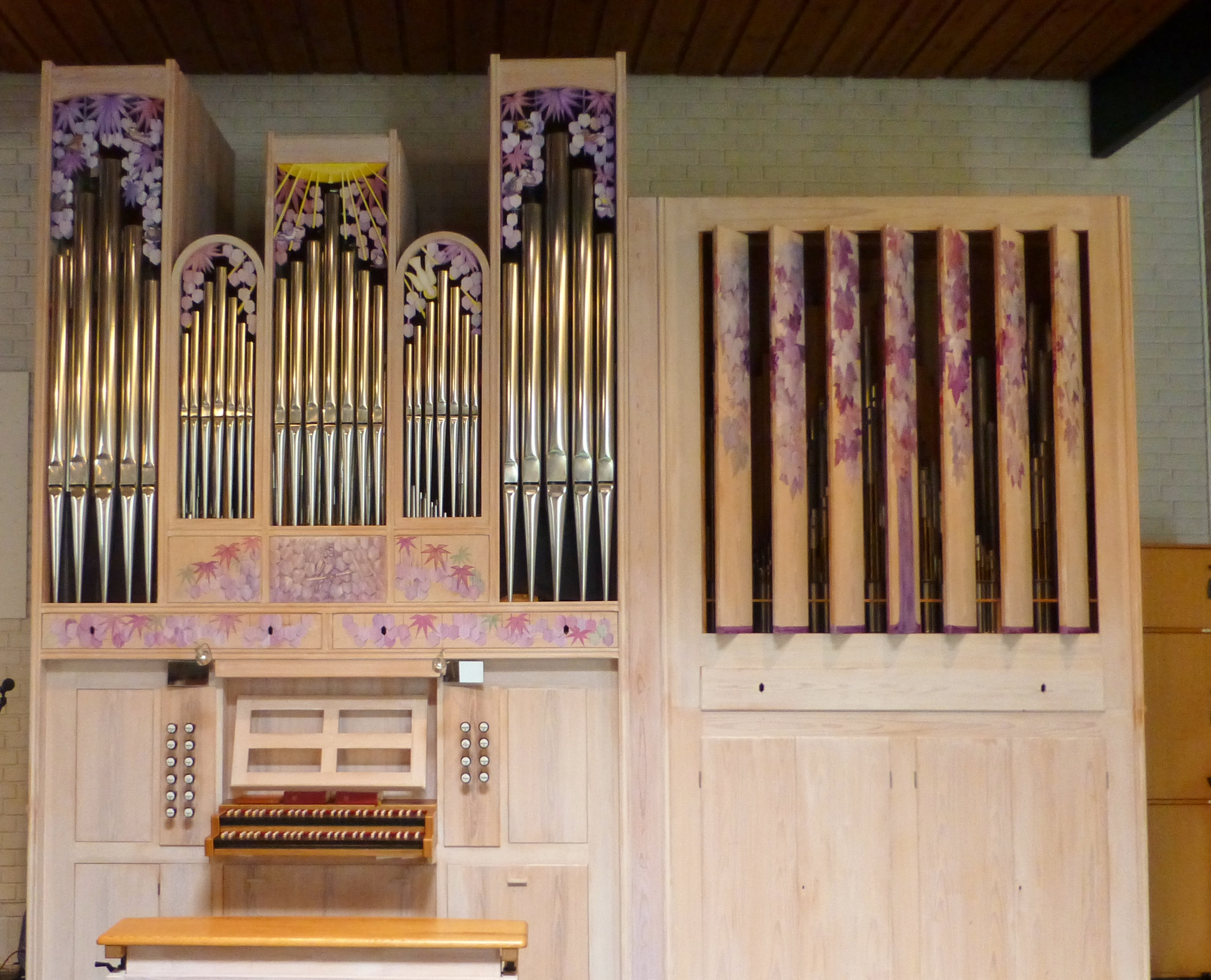
One of Thür's organs, at Trelleborg Church in Trelleborg, Sweden

Walter Thür Organbuilders (Swedish: Walter Thür Orgelbyggen) was a maker of pipe organs, based in Torshälla, Sweden. The company, established in 1968 by Walter Thür, an Austrian, made around 200 organs, most of them for the Church of Sweden in different parts of the world, including the United States, Singapore, Japan and the Philippines. The business closed upon Thür's death in 2014.

The main organ at Uppsala Cathedral, which is the largest preserved organ from the 1870s, was refurbished by Thür in 1976.

== Walter Thür ==
Walter Engelbert Thür was born on 23 July 1934 in Austria. He later worked in Norway, before moving to Sweden in the 1950s to work at Grönlunds Organbuilders. In 1968, he formed his company in an old caramel factory in Storgatan, Torshälla. In 1978, the business moved to Elpar's on Spångagatan.

Thür died on 11 March 2004, aged 69, in Eskilstuna, Sweden, shortly after completing the organ at the city's Klosters Church.

== Notable works ==
Thür either built or (where noted) refurbished the following pipe organs.

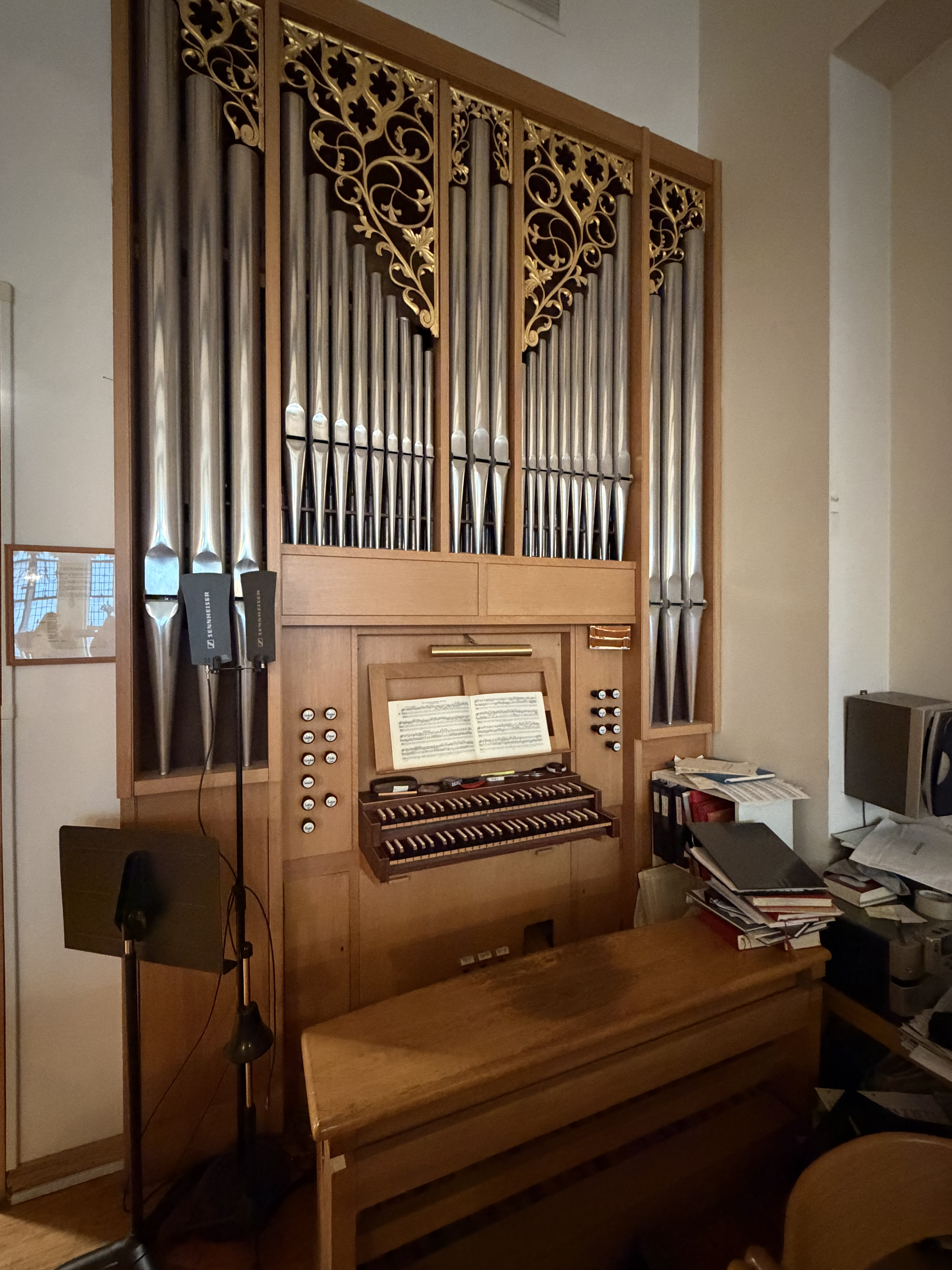
Organ inside the Church of Sweden in New York

- Uppsala Cathedral, Uppsala, Sweden (refurbished; 1976)
- Möja Kyrka, Värmdö, Sweden (1982)
- Torshälla Parish Church, Torshälla, Sweden (both organs; 1980s). The main organ has the façade left over from Daniel Stråhle's 1744 original construction
- Church of Sweden in New York, New York City, 1986
- Norwegian Seamen's Mission, Singapore (refurbished; 1995)
- Klosters Church, Eskilstuna, Sweden (2004)
