= James Frederick Talcott =

American businessman

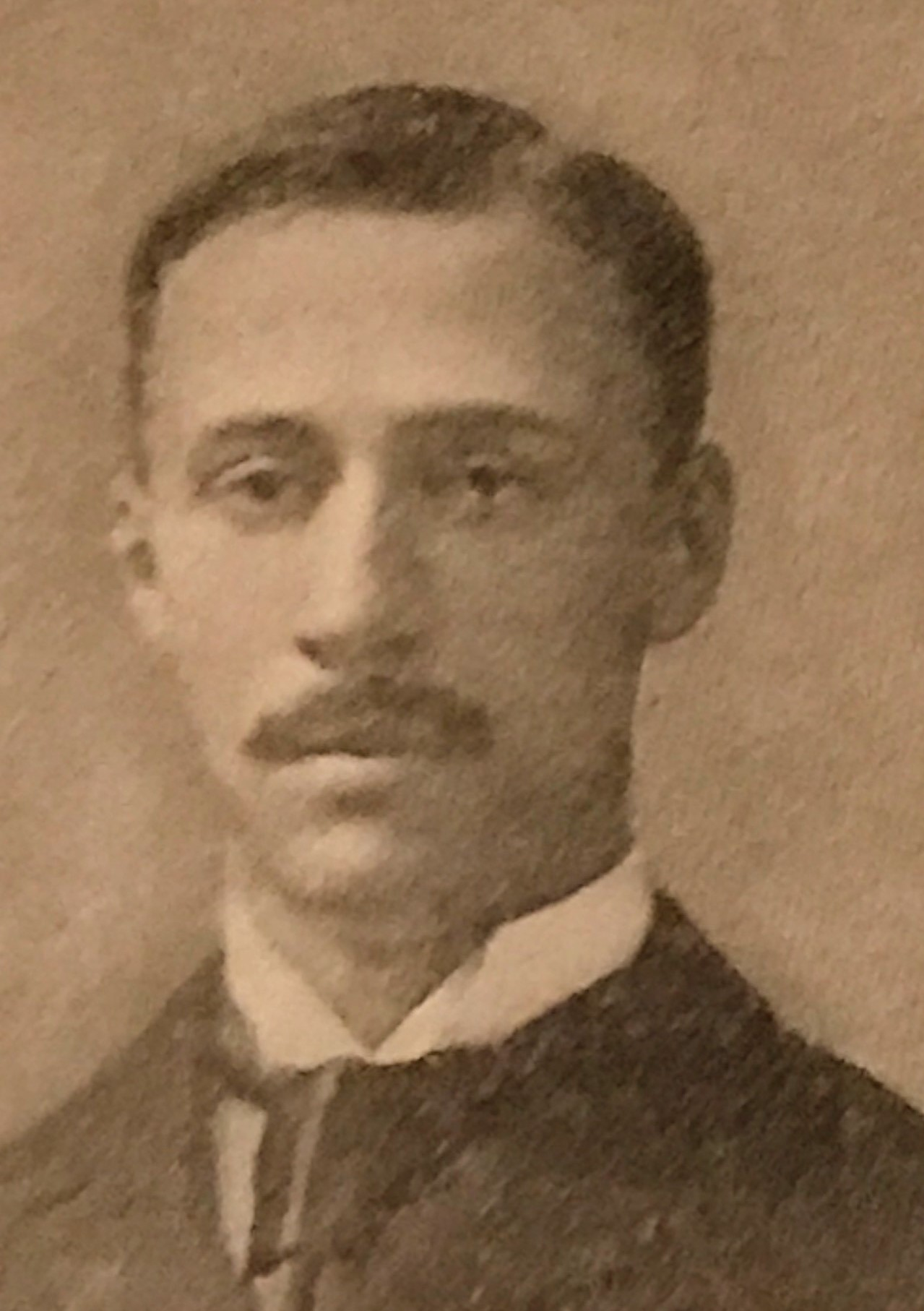
- Born: September 14, 1866; West Hartford, Connecticut, U.S.
- Died: February 6, 1944
- Burial place: Woodlawn Cemetery, Bronx, U.S.
- Occupations: Businessman, philanthropist
- Spouse: Frank Vanderbilt Crawford

James Frederick Talcott (September 14, 1866 – February 6, 1944) was an American financier and philanthropist involved in numerous charities and art organizations.

== Early life and education ==
James Frederick Talcott was the eldest son of James Talcott and Henrietta E. Francis Talcott, prominent American philanthropists who supported many charities and educational endeavors. He had five siblings although his brother Reginald died when he was two. He had two brothers, Francis and Arthur, and two sisters, Grace and Edith.

Unlike his father, who never received a college degree, Talcott was a graduate of Princeton University, Class of 1888. While he was an undergraduate, he helped found the University Cottage Club together with six other students.

== Personal life ==
Talcott married his first wife Frank Vanderbilt Crawford in 1890. She was the niece and namesake of Frank Armstrong Crawford Vanderbilt, the second wife of New York railroad businessman Cornelius Vanderbilt. They had four children together. She died in 1915. He remarried two years later in 1917. His second wife was Louise Simmons.

== Religious organizations ==
Faith was a constant theme in Talcott's life. He was engaged in numerous religious-based philanthropies and became a church deacon in 1893. He was affiliated with St. Bartholomew's Episcopal Church, where he delivered sermons.

In 1931, Talcott became president of the American Bible Society.

== Cultural and educational institutions ==
Funding equitable educational opportunities for others was important to Talcott. He was a trustee of Lincoln University, the nation's first degree-granting historically Black college and university. In 1934, he headed a $400,000 campaign to raise funds for capital improvements to the campus, including a new library, dining hall, assembly area and gym, along with other updated elements to the grounds.

Support of the arts was also important to Talcott. He was elected President of the National Arts Club in 1938. The club, although private, was a nonprofit that admitted women from its inception and also admitted the public to all of its gallery exhibitions.

== Legacy ==
The Talcott Fund carries on his charitable work supporting numerous nonprofit organizations throughout the country.

The J. Frederick Talcott Award was at one time considered to be the nation's highest etching award. It was bestowed by the Society of American Etchers, which today is known as the Society of Graphic Artists. The distinction was given to the best print by an etcher who was not a member of the society but who displayed work at the annual exhibition which was often held at the National Arts Club.
