= Church of Sweden in New York =

Church in Manhattan, New York

Church of Sweden, New York
- Swedish Seamen's Church
- Svenska kyrkan i New York
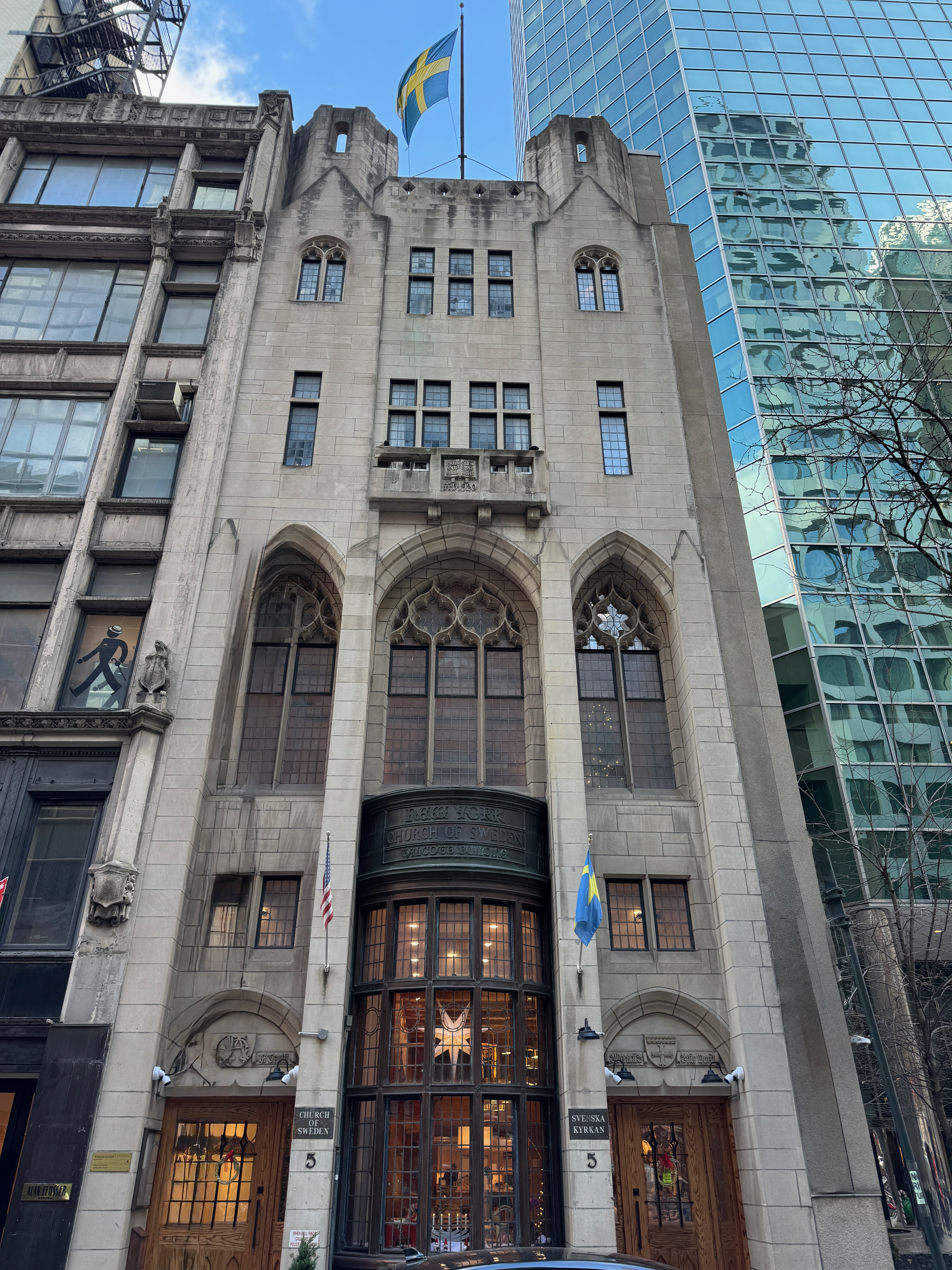
- The church in 2024
- Church of Sweden, New York
- 40°45′26″N 73°58′39″W
- Location: 5 East 48th Street, Midtown Manhattan, New York City
- Country: United States
- Denomination: Church of Sweden

Architecture
- Completed: 1921 (105 years ago)
- New York Bible Society
- U.S. National Register of Historic Places
- New York State Register of Historic Places
- Location within Manhattan Location within New York City Location within New York Location within the United States
- Location: 5 E. 48th St., Manhattan, New York
- Coordinates: 40°45′33″N 73°58′37″W
- Area: 0.1 acres (0.040 ha)
- NRHP reference No.: 13001152
- NYSRHP No.: 06101.018598

Significant dates
- Added to NRHP: February 5, 2014
- Designated NYSRHP: December 12, 2013

Church of Sweden in New York (Swedish: Svenska kyrkan i New York; also known as the Swedish Seamen's Church) is a Church of Sweden church at 5 East 48th Street in Midtown Manhattan, New York City. It is a parish of the Church of Sweden Abroad. Dating to 1921, it was placed on the National Register of Historic Places in 2014.

The church is currently open Wednesday to Sunday. A library and reading room (featuring a memorial plaque to Raoul Wallenberg) is located on the first floor, while the chapel, sacristy and children's room is on the second floor. The chapel's organ dates to 1986, the work of Torshälla's Walter Thür. The uppermost floors are private residences and a rooftop terrace.

== History ==
Demand for the founding of a Swedish church came about after around 1.4 million Swedes arrived on American shores between 1820 and 1900. Swedish immigrants found solace in churches earlier than this one, where they could keep up with news from their homeland, collect and send mail and enjoy refreshments.

The current church building was originally built on the site of a modest brownstone constructed in 1873. In April 1921, a year after a donation of around $250,000 from Henrietta E. Francis Talcott, a Gothic style edifice appeared in its place. The building was dedicated as a home for the New York Bible Society. The donor was the wife of textile merchant turned millionaire James Talcott, who died in 1916 at the age of 86. The new building was the work of architect Wilfred E. Anthony (1878–1948). Henrietta died in December 1921, aged 79; it is not known whether she got to see the finished building.

On March 31, 1978, the Church of Sweden Abroad bought the property from the New York Bible Society for $570,000. The air rights were sold in 1981 for $1 million and paid off the debt.

The song "Christmas in New York" was written by Billy Butt on the church's piano in 1979.

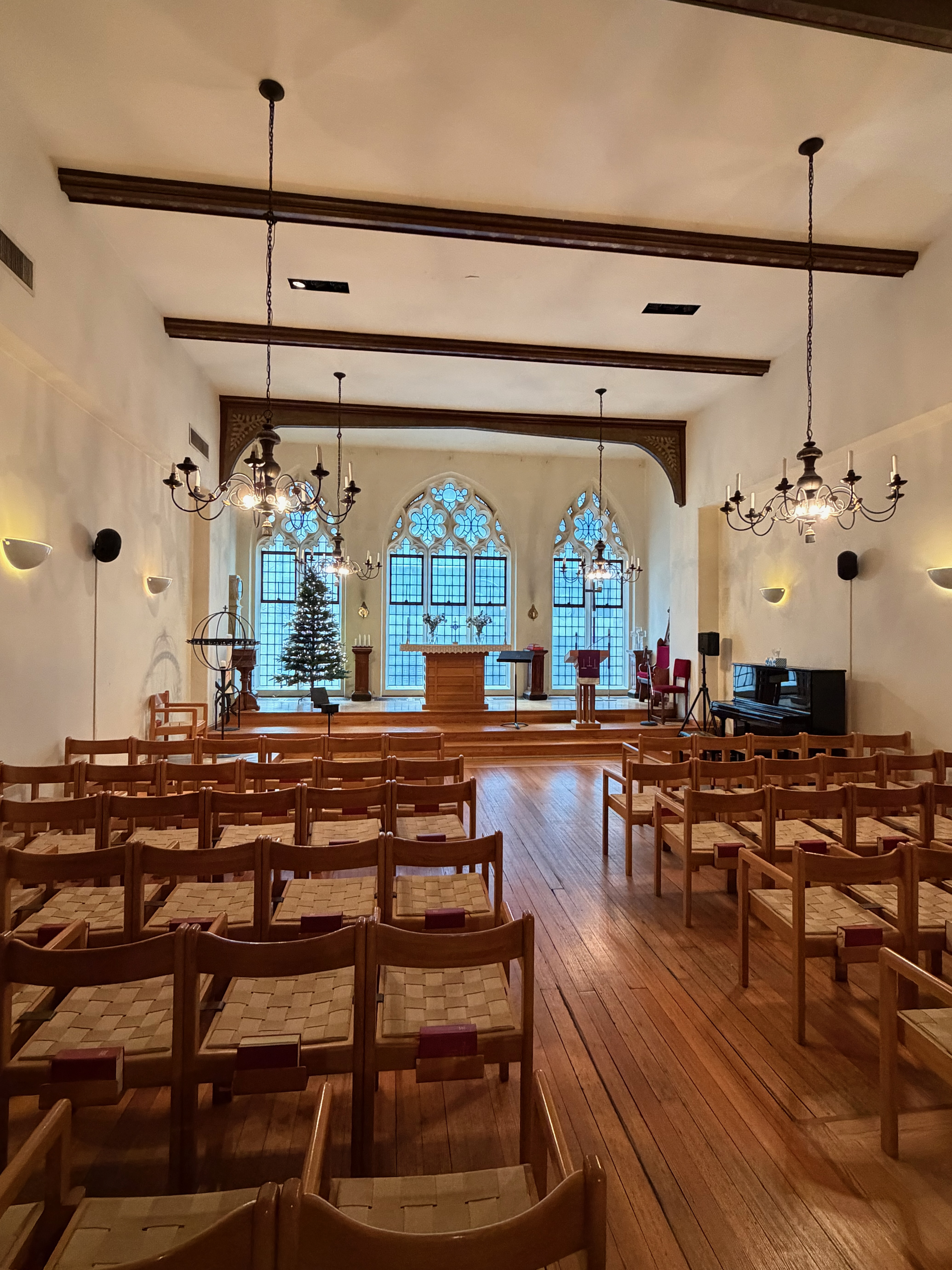
Chapel, 2025

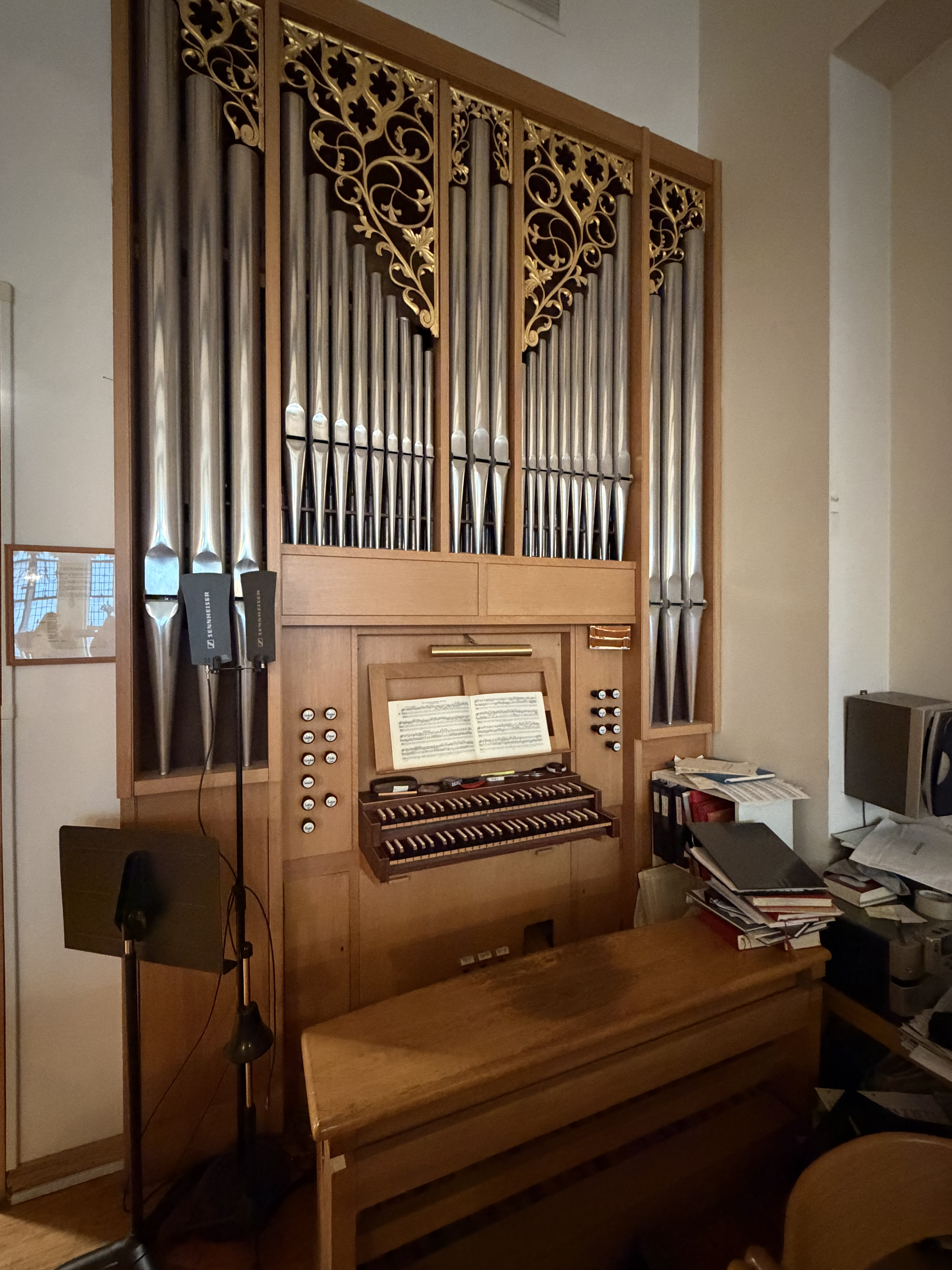
Organ, 2025

== See also ==
- National Register of Historic Places listings in Manhattan from 14th to 59th Streets
