= John Butler Talcott =

American industrialist (1824 - 1905)

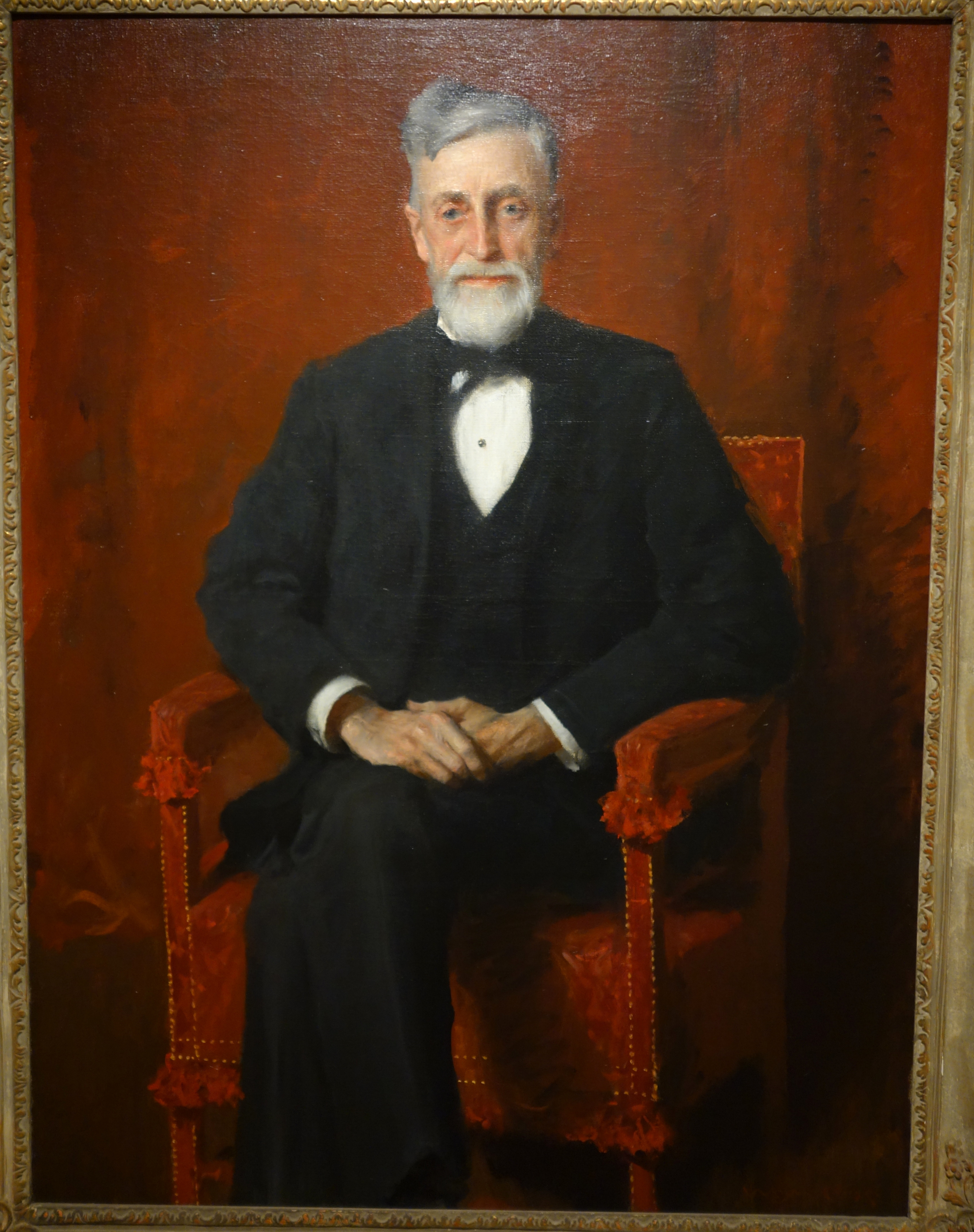
- John Butler Talcott by William Merritt Chase
- Born: September 14, 1824; Enfield, Connecticut
- Died: February 21, 1905 (aged 80); New Britain, Connecticut
- Education: Class of 1846, Yale University
- Known for: Founding the New Britain Museum of American Art
- Spouse(s): Jane Crosswell Goodwin, Fannie Hall Hazen
- Relatives: Nephew, painter Allen Butler Talcott

John Butler Talcott (September 14, 1824 - February 21, 1905) was a New Britain, Connecticut industrialist and philanthropist who founded the New Britain Museum of American Art, the oldest museum dedicated solely to American art.

== Education and early career ==
Born in Enfield, Connecticut, John Butler Talcott was a descendant of Thomas Hooker one of the founders of the state of Connecticut. He attended Hartford Public High School with Frederic Edwin Church and was afterwards educated at Yale where he graduated in 1846. He received a law degree but never practiced due to illness. Instead, he became a tutor at Middlebury College and then Yale.

By 1851, Talcott had moved to New Britain, a center for manufacturing. There he was introduced to the business of mass-producing clothing hardware such as hooks and eyes used in undergarments and knit goods through Seth J. North. North was the founder of North & Judd, one of New Britain's oldest hardware companies as well as the New Britain Knitting Company, and the father of one of Talcott's classmates at Yale. The large textile concern had been created in 1848. The two became partners. Talcott eventually became the treasurer, manager and finally president of NBK Co.

Talcott formed a business with Yale classmate Frederick H. North and Seth North's grandson, Oliver Stanley; their venture called North & Stanley would grow and produce military uniforms during the Civil War. North & Stanley shared premises with another hardware company called P. & F. Corbin and Talcott became a charter director of that entity as well.

John's brother James Talcott, and several other New Britain figures helped make the New Britain Knitting Company flourish. The two Talcotts subsequently formed the American Hosiery Company in 1868 with locations in New Britain and New York City. Both companies became well known for making shirts, fine hosiery and underwear. Having also served as the secretary and treasurer of American Hosiery, Talcott became president of the company in 1885.

In 1904, Talcott led American Hosiery to win a Silver Medal at the St. Louis World's Fair for its fine products. Wool for these items was imported from Australia, a first for any US knit goods manufacturer.

== Politics ==
Talcott had several civic roles including his service on New Britain's city council, a term as alderman, and finally as the 5th mayor of New Britain serving for two terms.

== Philanthropy ==
Talcott was one of the original individuals who incorporated the New Britain Institute in 1858. The institute was a library and civic venture intended to benefit the public including many of the workmen of the industrial city that might not otherwise have access to books and reading opportunities. In addition to serving on its building and finance committees, he served as its president without interruption from 1882 until his death. While president, he made a pivotal gift for the acquisition of art. He created the Talcott Art Fund in 1903 with a donation of $20,000 in gold bonds to the New Britain Art Institute, followed by another gift of $5000. The donations were made for the specific purchase of "original modern oil paintings either by native or foreign artists ... in the departments of art known as figure, landscape and genre subjects". Three years after his death, income from the fund had become sufficiently large to make a first purchase. By 1938, 24 oil paintings had been bought including works by Hudson River School landscape painter George Inness. The Institute later became the New Britain Museum of American Art which still exists today.

== Personal life ==
Talcott's first wife was Jane Crosswell Goodwin and they had 4 children. His second wife was Fannie Hall Hazen and they had 2 daughters; one them, Helen Hooker Talcott, married into the Stanley family of Stanley Black & Decker tool production fame, and she also became a benefactor of the New Britain Museum.

Talcott's nephew was tonalist artist Allen Butler Talcott, a founding member of the Old Lyme art colony.

Following his death and the settlement of his estate, his shares of New Britain Knitting had no value.
