= E. Volney Bingham =

American politician and lawyer (1844–1922)

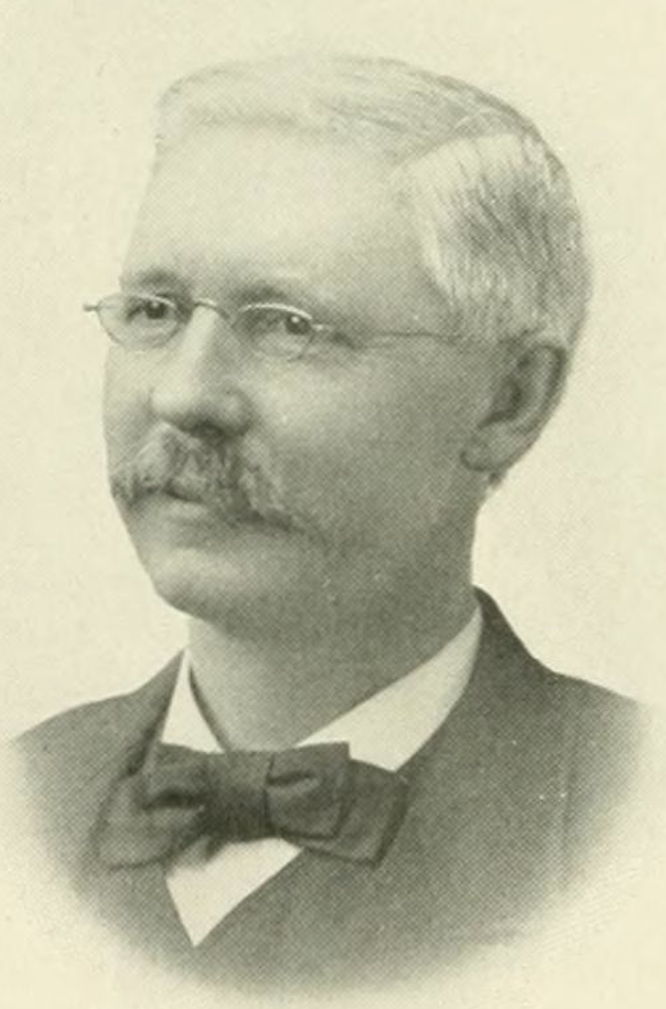
- Bingham in 1901 publication

Member of the Indiana Senate
- In office 1907–1909
- Preceded by: Thad M. Talcott
- In office 1893–1895

Personal details
- Born: August 1, 1844 Penn Township, St. Joseph County, Indiana, U.S.
- Died: April 23, 1922 (aged 77) Mishawaka, Indiana, U.S.
- Resting place: South Bend City Cemetery; South Bend, Indiana, U.S.
- Party: Democratic
- Spouse: Harriet A. Grimes (m. 1871)
- Children: 4
- Occupation: Politician; lawyer

E. Volney Bingham (August 1, 1844 – April 23, 1922) was a politician and lawyer from Indiana. He served in the Indiana Senate from 1893 to 1895 and 1907 to 1909.

== Early life and education ==
E. Volney Bingham was born on August 1, 1844, in Penn Township, St. Joseph County, Indiana, to Ann (née Miller) and Alfred Bingham. Bingham attended schools in Mishawaka and worked in the furniture manufacturing business. He studied law and was later admitted to the bar in 1875.

== Career ==
Bingham enlisted in Company G of the 48th Indiana Infantry Regiment during the American Civil War. He served until the end of the war and was promoted to sergeant major.

After the war, Bingham worked as a clerk for two years and worked as a traveling salesman. He was a Democrat. He was elected as justice of the peace of Mishawaka and served for twelve years. President Grover Cleveland appointed Bingham as postmaster of Mishawaka. He served in that role for four years. Bingham also served as a member of the Mishawaka school board for 25 years.

Bingham was elected to the Indiana Senate in 1893. In 1906, Bingham was elected to the Indiana Senate by a margin of 24 votes. The results were contested, but he ultimately won the seat over former state senator Thad Talcott. He served from 1907 to 1909.

Bingham served as deputy prosecuting attorney in Mishawaka.

== Personal life ==
Bingham married Harriet "Hattie" A. Grimes on December 7, 1871. They had two sons and two daughters, J. Fred, Charles, Beth and Mrs. John F. Nuner.

Bingham lived and practiced law at 213–215 East Third Street in Mishawaka. He died on April 23, 1922, at his home in Mishawaka. He was buried at South Bend City Cemetery.
