= Wilfred E. Anthony =

American architect, 1878–1948

- Born: 1878
- Died: 1948 (aged 69–70)
- Occupation: Architect
- Buildings: Church of Sweden in New York

Wilfred E. Anthony (1878–1948) was an American architect. A "Gothic specialist", he worked for Cram, Goodhue & Ferguson.

He designed several buildings, including the Church of Sweden in Midtown Manhattan, New York City.

== Notable works ==
- Church of Sweden in New York, New York City (1921)
- Basilica of the Sacred Heart, Notre Dame, Indiana (1931)
- Corpus Christi Church, New York City (1935)
- Church of St. Vincent Ferrer, Holy Name Society Building, New York City
- Dominican Priory, River Forest, Illinois
- Fenwick High School, Oak Park, Illinois
- Valentino-Cidat showroom, New York City

== See also ==
- Alfred E. Reinhardt
