= Philip Corbin (manufacturer) =

American entrepreneur

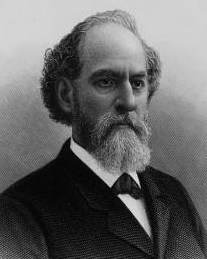
- Born: October 26, 1824; Willington, Connecticut
- Died: November 3, 1910 (aged 86)
- Education: West Hartford Academy
- Occupation: Entrepreneur
- Spouse: Francina T. Whiting
- Children: 3

Philip Corbin (1824-1910) was an American industrialist who founded P&F Corbin Company, a major manufacturer of decorative hardware. It was first based in New Britain, Connecticut, where he founded it with his brother Frank Corbin.

== Early life ==
Corbin was born on October 26, 1824, in Willington, Connecticut. He was the third of ten children. When Corbin was seven, the family moved to Farmington, then to West Hartford, finally settling in Ellington, Connecticut. When he was age 15, the family returned to their homestead known as Corbin's Corners, in West Hartford. There, Corbin and his brothers worked on the family farm, were contracted as seasonal workers to other farmers, and attended district schools.

Corbin attended the West Hartford Academy. At age 19, Corbin started working in a New Britain hardware factory.

== Early work ==
In March 1844, Philip Corbin began working for the Matteson, Russell & Erwin Company (later Russell & Erwin). In the fall of 1844, Corbin worked for Henry Andrews, who had secured a contract to make locks for North & Stanley. At the Henry Andrews Company, Corbin apprenticed and learned the art of lock making.

Later, he obtained a contract for himself with North & Stanley. After he gained that contract, his brother Frank joined him in New Britain. Soon after, they formed the P&F Corbin Company.

== Founding the P&F Corbin Company ==
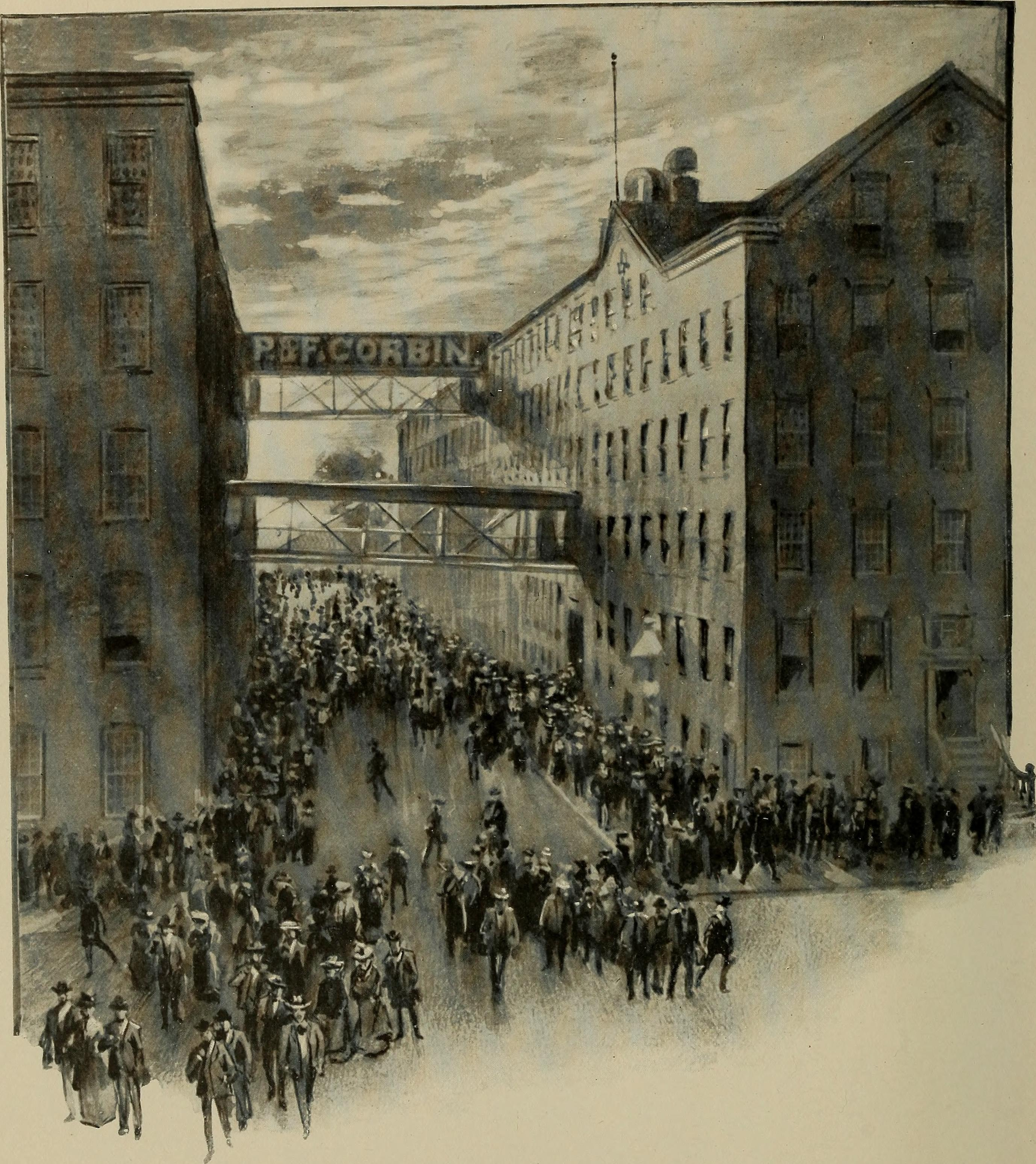
P. and F. Corbin factory

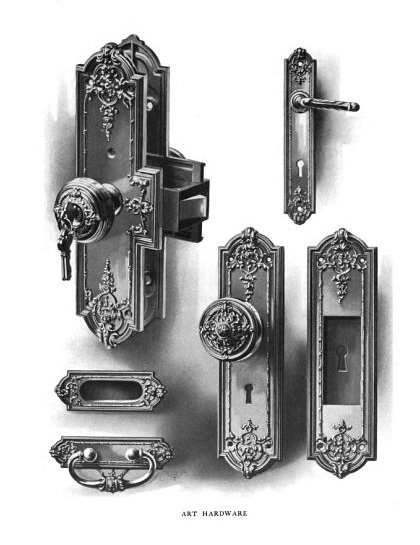
P&F Corbin Company, Decorative Hardware

In June 1848, Corbin married Francina T. Whiting. The couple had three children, two of whom survived. They later adopted a daughter.

At the end of 1848, the Corbin brothers sought a partner for P&F Corbin. In a small factory built by Corbin's father-in-law, the brothers, along with Edward Doen, began their first manufacturing firm. The first items produced at the factory were ox balls for the horns of oxen and steer. A year later Henry Whiting bought out Doen's interests in the company, and the firm became known as Corbin, Whiting and Company. By 1851 the Corbin brothers had purchased Whiting's interest, and the firm became known as the P&F Corbin Company.

The company shared a building with the owners of the North & Stanley Company, which owned their premises. In 1853, several North & Stanley directors, including John Butler Talcott, also became directors of P&F Corbin.

Through the latter half of the 19th century, P&F Corbin manufactured builders’ hardware including coat and hat hooks, sash fasteners, picture nails, locks, knobs, as well as coffin trimmings.

In early 1870, the company switched to decorative hardware. Many prominent buildings from Boston to Philadelphia, including the Connecticut State Capitol in Hartford, are outfitted with Corbin decorative hardware.

== Other business ==
Corbin was the president of the P&F Corbin Company, the American Hardware Corporation, Corbin Cabinet Lock Company, the New Britain Machine Company, and the Porter and Dylon Company. He was vice president of the New Britain Savings Bank, Director of the Hartford National Bank, the Mechanics National Bank in New Britain, and the Hartford Steam Boiler Inspection and Insurance Company of Hartford.

Corbin served as warden of the borough of New Britain before its incorporation, and was elected as a member of the city council. He was appointed as head of the Water Commission, where he supervised the expansion of the city's water supply.

He was involved with the South Congregational Church in New Britain and served as the chairman of the Societies Commission.

Early on, Corbin was a dedicated Whig party member. He later joined the Republican Party when it was organized. Although he did not aspire to political life, he agreed to run for office. He was elected to the State Legislature in 1884, and in 1888 was appointed as a member of the Connecticut State Senate.

== Death and legacy ==
Corbin died after a long illness on November 3, 1910, at age 86. At the time of his death, Corbin's companies employed over 1,800 people. They were major manufacturing centers in New Britain, where he had started an automobile manufacturing company, picking up on that new industry. The P&F Corbin Company eventually merged with other local manufacturers and became the American Hardware Corporation. Black and Decker purchased the company in 1989. In 2010, the Stanley Works, also of New Britain, purchased Black and Decker, now called Stanley Black & Decker.

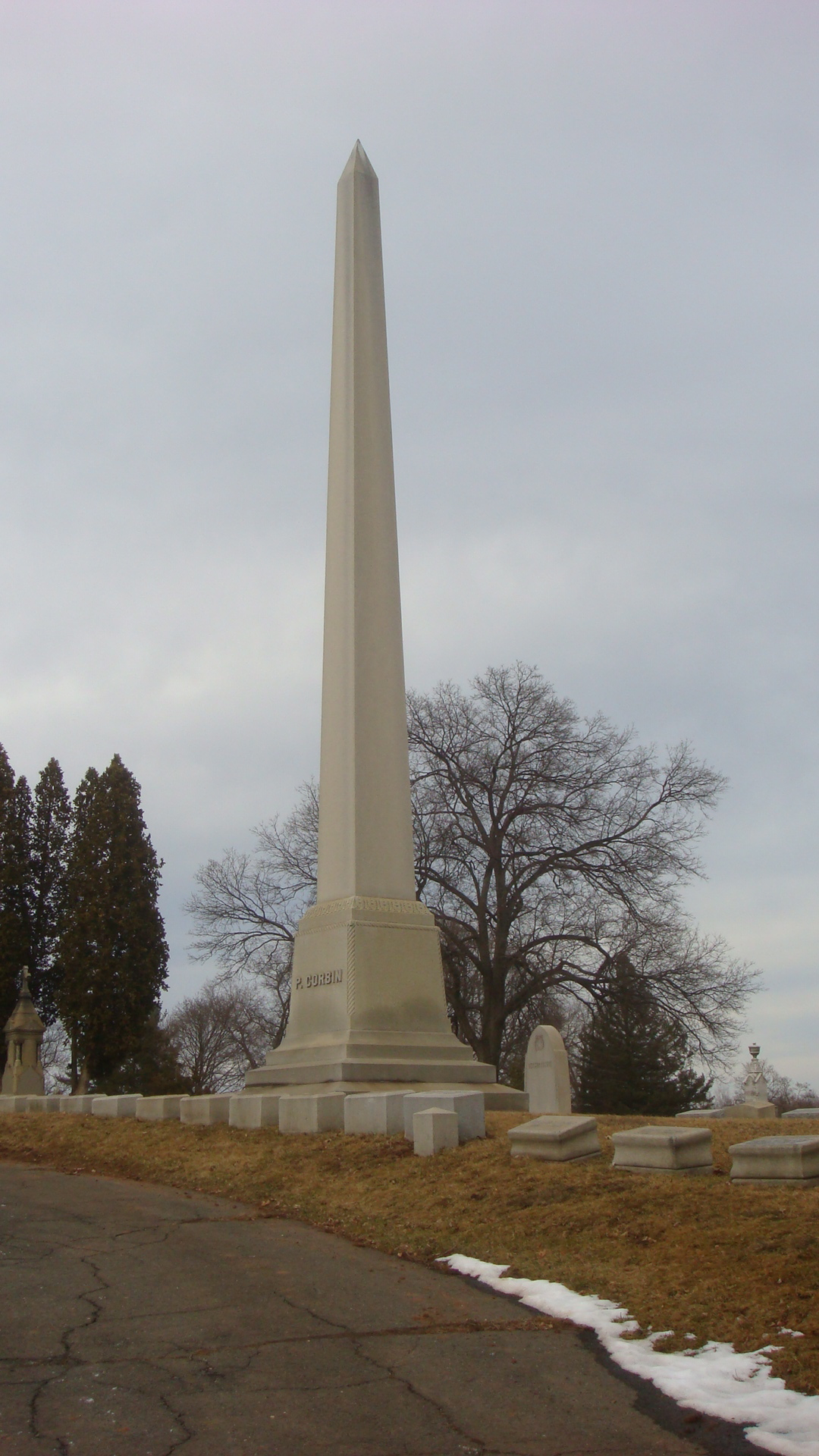
Corbin family plot, New Britain, Connecticut

Corbin is buried at Fairview Cemetery in New Britain. In May 1999, the Corbin Monument at the cemetery was noted as the second-tallest private family grave marker in the country. One of the main streets in New Britain, Corbin Avenue, is named after him. The site of the original family homestead is still called Corbin's Corners, but was redeveloped as a shopping center.
