= Thad M. Talcott =

American politician (1875–1957)

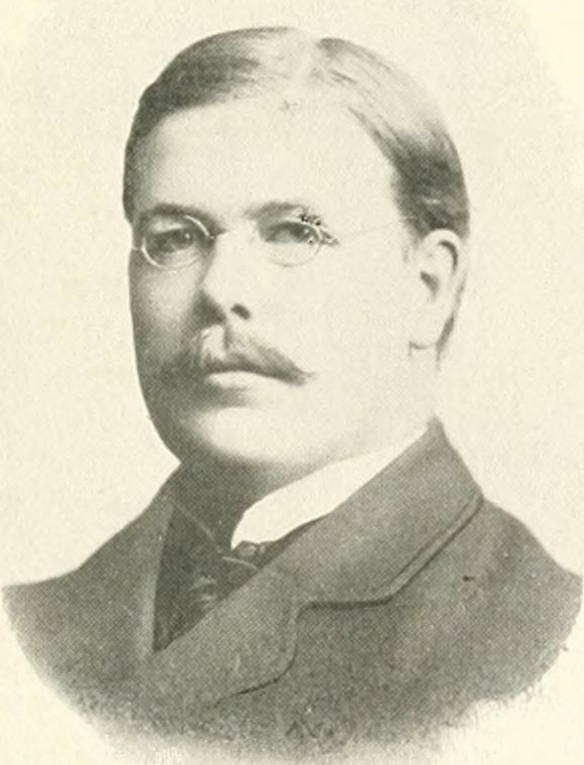
- Talcott in 1901 publication

Member of the Indiana Senate
- In office 1905–1906
- Succeeded by: E. Volney Bingham

Member of the Indiana House of Representatives
- In office 1902

Personal details
- Born: Thaddeus Mead Talcott Jr. October 18, 1875 Cleveland, Ohio, U.S.
- Died: December 12, 1957 (aged 82) South Bend, Indiana, U.S.
- Resting place: Riverview Cemetery; South Bend, Indiana, U.S.
- Party: Republican
- Spouse: Maude Rodney (m. 1909; died 1952)
- Education: Cornell University; Northwestern University (MA, LLB); Yale University (LLM)
- Occupation: Politician; lawyer
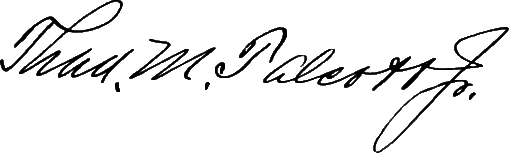
- Signature

Thaddeus Mead Talcott Jr. (October 18, 1875 – December 12, 1957) was a politician and lawyer from Indiana. He served in the Indiana House of Representatives in 1902 and the Indiana Senate from 1905 to 1906.

== Early life ==
Thaddeus Mead Talcott Jr. was born on October 18, 1875, in Cleveland, Ohio, to Nellie S. (née Spalding) and Thaddeus M. Talcott. He moved to Chicago at the age of three and attended public schools there. He graduated from Northwestern University in 1894 with a Master of Arts and Northwestern University School of Law in 1896 with a Bachelor of Laws. He graduated with a Master of Laws from Yale Law School in 1897. He was admitted to the bar in Chicago in 1897. He also studied law at Cornell University.

== Career ==
After graduating, Talcott went to Chicago to practice law. He then moved to South Bend, Indiana, in August 1900, to practice law. He opened an office at 7 Oliver Opera House. In 1901, Talcott joined with George R. Fish to form the law partnership Talcott & Fish.

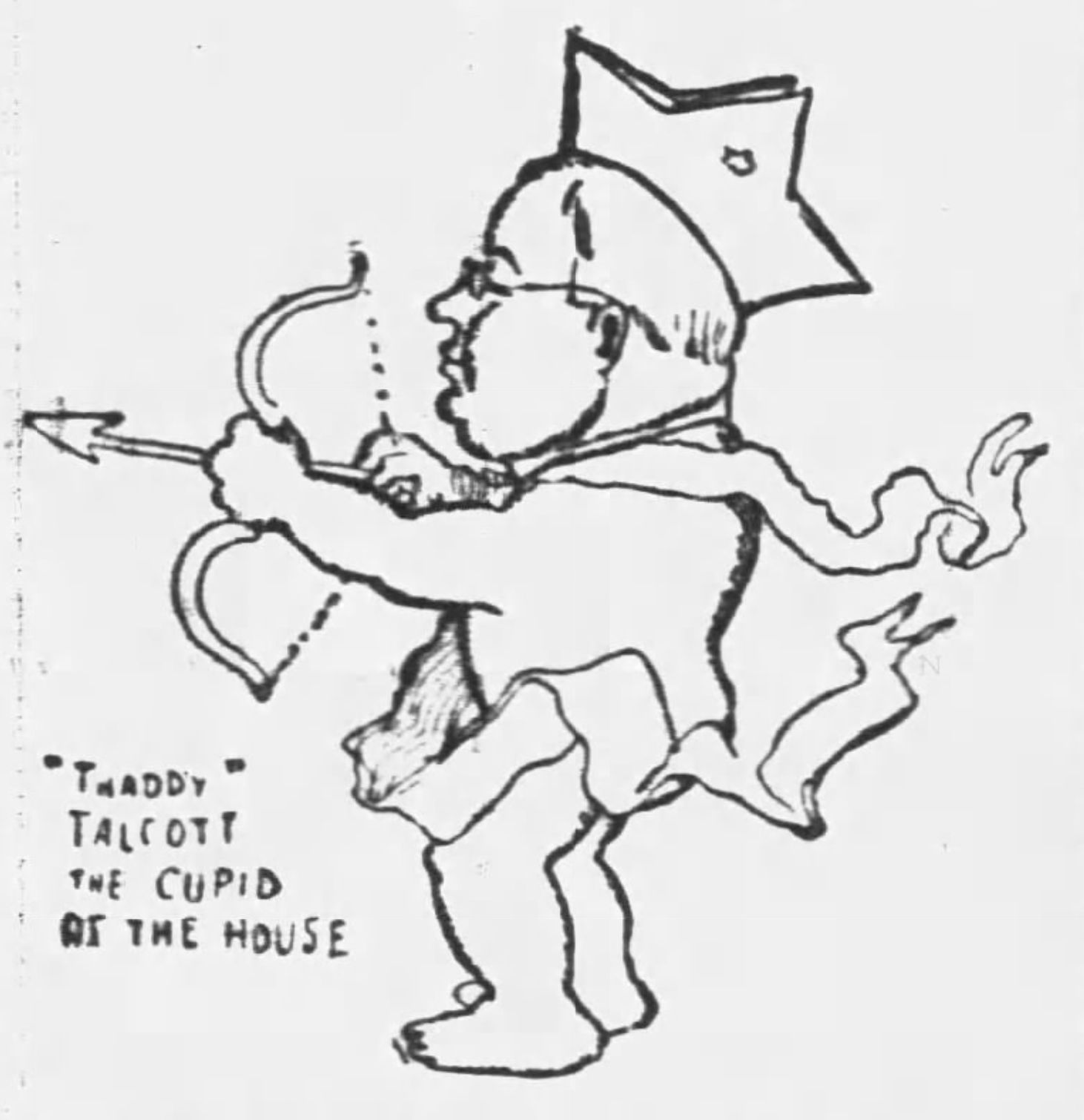
Cartoon of Representative Talcott in 1903

Talcott was a Republican. He was elected as a member of the Indiana House of Representatives in 1902. He was given the nickname "Thaddy" Talcott while in the Indiana House of Representatives. Talcott was elected to the Indiana Senate in 1904. In 1906, Talcott was defeated for re-election by E. Volney Bingham by a margin of 24 votes. The results were contested, but Bingham ultimately won.

Talcott served as U.S. Commissioner for 37 years, starting in 1907. He served under three different federal judges. In 1956, Talcott formed a law partnership with Samuel Feiwell called Talcott & Feiwell at 415 St. Joseph Bank Building.

Talcott was a member of the St. Joseph County Grange, a Freemason and a member of the Knights Templar. Talcott was a member, treasurer from 1929 to at least 1937 and president in 1922 of the Commercial Law League of America. He was a director and president of the First Federal Savings and Loan Association in South Bend.

== Personal life ==
Talcott married Maude Rodney in February 1909. She died on February 5, 1952.

Later in life, Talbott lived at 126 West Marion Street in South Bend. Talbott died on December 12, 1957, at Memorial Hospital in South Bend. He was buried at Riverview Cemetery in South Bend.

== Legacy ==
The Thad M. Talcott Jr. Journal Endowment Fund was set up by the Commercial Law League of America in his honor.
