= NGA =

NGA may refer to:

== Language ==
- Nga (Indic), a glyph in the Brahmic family of scripts
- Nga (Javanese) (ꦔ), a letter in the Javanese script
- Ngā, the (plural) definite article in the Māori language

== Organizations ==
=== US-based ===
- National Gallery of Art, museum in Washington, DC
- National Geospatial-Intelligence Agency, United States combat support agency
- National Giving Alliance (formerly Needlework Guild of America and NGA, Inc.), an American clothing donation charity
- National Golf Association, a former developmental golf tour
- National Governors Association, political organization for leaders of states, federal territories, and commonwealths
- National Greyhound Association, a registry for purebred greyhounds
- National Gym Association, a non-profit promoting all-natural bodybuilding

=== Other organizations ===
- National Gallery of Australia, museum in Canberra
- National Governors' Association (UK charity), an English charity relating to school governors
- National Graphical Association, a British trade union
- BBC Radio 3 New Generation Artists scheme, a talent scheme run by BBC Radio 3

== Places ==
- Nigeria, by ISO 3166-1 three-letter (alpha-3) code
- Young Airport, New South Wales, Australia, IATA airport code "NGA"

== Other uses ==
- Nga (god), a Siberian deity
- Nga people, a tribal group of Arunachal Pradesh
- Natural Gas Act of 1938, first regulation of the natural gas industry by the United States federal government
- Next generation access, fibre optic broadband
