= Unfrosted =

2024 film by Jerry Seinfeld

- Official release poster
- Directed by: Jerry Seinfeld
- Screenplay by: Jerry Seinfeld; Spike Feresten; Andy Robin; Barry Marder
- Produced by: Jerry Seinfeld; Spike Feresten; Beau Bauman
- Starring: Jerry Seinfeld; Melissa McCarthy; Jim Gaffigan; Max Greenfield; Hugh Grant; Amy Schumer
- Cinematography: William Pope
- Edited by: Evan Henke
- Music by: Christophe Beck
- Production companies: Columbus 81 Productions; Skyview Entertainment; Good One Productions
- Distributed by: Netflix
- Release date: May 3, 2024
- Running time: 95 minutes British Board of Film Classification
- Country: United States
- Language: English
- Budget: $70 million

Unfrosted is a 2024 American comedy film directed by Jerry Seinfeld from a screenplay he co-wrote with his writing team of Spike Feresten, Barry Marder, and Andy Robin. Loosely based on the true story of the creation of Pop-Tarts toaster pastries, the film stars an ensemble cast that includes Seinfeld, Melissa McCarthy, Jim Gaffigan, Max Greenfield, Hugh Grant, and Amy Schumer.

Seinfeld's feature directorial debut, he and Feresten also serve as producers of the film alongside Beau Bauman, through their production company Columbus 81 Productions. Unfrosted was released in the United States by Netflix on May 3, 2024, and received mixed reviews from critics. It was nominated for a Primetime Emmy Award for Outstanding Television Movie, while Seinfeld won Worst Actor and Schumer won Worst Supporting Actress at the 45th Golden Raspberry Awards.

== Plot ==
A young boy running away from home orders Pop-Tarts in a diner, and a man named Bob Cabana offers to tell him the true origin story of the American breakfast food.

In 1963, Bob is head of development at the Kellogg's corporation, headquartered in Battle Creek, Michigan. After Kellogg's once again dominates their rival Post in the annual Bowl and Spoon Awards, Bob senses that Post is about to unveil something that could dominate the market. Soon after, he observes two children dumpster-diving at Post, and discovers the company is creating a shelf-stable, fruit-based pastry breakfast food that seems to have addictive effects on children.

The Kellogg's team learns that Post has further developed a product created for Kellogg's by Bob's former co-worker Donna "Stan" Stankowski. Bob convinces his boss Edsel Kellogg to hire Stan back from NASA, and the team sets to work creating their own version of the pastry, recruiting several prominent figures from different industries as "taste pilots".

Marjorie Post, the head of the Post company and Edsel Kellogg's former lover, calls a meeting of the "five cereal families": Kellogg's, Post, Quaker Oats, Ralston Purina and General Mills. To the surprise of Bob's team, Marjorie announces that their product will be on shelves within one week. Bob undercuts them by obtaining exclusive rights to 99% of the world's sugar by making a deal with Puerto Rican criminal El Sucre.

Bob begins to worry about the taste pilots' lack of progress, but he and Stan combine several of their ideas to come up with a rectangular, fruit-filled food packaged in foil that can be toasted. Kellogg warns Bob that by creating a product that is served without milk, they may be stepping on the toes of the dairy industry, in reality an incredibly powerful and ruthless cabal whose leader kidnaps and threatens Bob.

Meanwhile, Marjorie visits the USSR in an attempt to secure rights to Cuban sugar from Nikita Khrushchev. The idea of a communist breakfast worries president John F. Kennedy, who summons the Kellogg's team to the White House to discuss the matter and ultimately agrees to instruct his brother to put pressure on organized milk.

While testing the new pastry, taste pilot Steve Schwinn is blown up in an accident and is buried with "full cereal honors". Meanwhile, Thurl Ravenscroft, a long-suffering Shakespearean actor who performs the mascot role of Tony the Tiger for Kellogg's, is convinced by the milk syndicate that the new breakfast pastry will make the cereal mascots obsolete. At Schwinn's funeral, Thurl convinces the other mascots to join him in a strike.

The team struggles with marketing the new pastry, eventually settling on the name "Trat-Pop" at the suggestion of the dumpster-divers. A mob of mascots, led by Thurl, violently breaches Kellogg's headquarters, hoping to stop the product from being certified by the FDA. (Note: The scene contains numerous references to the January 6 United States Capitol attack, including Thurl's costume resembling the garb of the QAnon Shaman.) They are too late, and the product is certified. Walter Cronkite, reading a news brief off a piece of Silly Putty, misreads "Trat-Pop" in reverse as "Pop-Tart", forcing Kellogg's to change the name moments before they are shipped out.

The following morning, Pop-Tarts sell out of every store in the country within 60 seconds, defeating Post's poorly named "Country Squares". Thurl ends up facing a congressional committee for his role in the attack, the milkmen are implicated in Kennedy's assassination, and Marjorie Post becomes an icon of feminism who retires to Mar-a-Lago. Stan leaves Kellogg's again, becomes a hippie, and invents granola. Bob becomes nationally famous, and, during an interview on The Tonight Show Starring Johnny Carson, is shot by Andy Warhol, who is furious that the name "Pop-Tart" sounds like "pop art". Bob survives thanks to the foil packet in his pocket.

In the present, the boy expresses doubt that a Pop-Tart packet could stop a bullet, and begins to question other elements of the story such as the creation of a sentient ravioli creature. Bob admits that the story was made up as the boy's parents arrive to take him home. As they turn to go, the ravioli creature emerges from Bob's pocket.

== Cast ==
- Jerry Seinfeld as Bob Cabana, an employee of Kellogg's, loosely based on William Post
- Melissa McCarthy as Donna Stankowski, a NASA food scientist who joins the Kellogg's team
- Jim Gaffigan as Edsel Kellogg III, the head of Kellogg's and Bob's boss
- Max Greenfield as Rick Ludwin, an employee of Post
- Hugh Grant as Thurl Ravenscroft, a Shakespearean actor cast as Tony the Tiger
- Amy Schumer as Marjorie Post, the head of rival cereal company Post
- Peter Dinklage as Harry Friendly, leader of the milk syndicate
- Christian Slater as Mike Diamond, a sinister milkman
- Bill Burr as John F. Kennedy
- Dan Levy as Andy Warhol
- James Marsden as Jack LaLanne, one of the taste pilots
- Jack McBrayer as Steve Schwinn, one of the taste pilots
- Thomas Lennon as Harold von Braunhut, a Nazi taste pilot
- Bobby Moynihan as Chef Boy Ardee, an Italian taste pilot, who accidentally invents a sentient ravioli creature with Harold and becomes the inspiration for the crimped edges of Pop-Tarts
- Adrian Martinez as Tom Carvel
- Sarah Cooper as Poppy Northcutt
- Mikey Day as Crackle
- Kyle Mooney as Snap
- Drew Tarver as Pop
- Tony Hale as Eddie Mink
- Felix Solis as El Sucre, a Puerto Rican crime boss who dominates the global sugar market
- Maria Bakalova as Rada Adzhubey
- Dean Norris as Nikita Khrushchev, the leader of the USSR
- Kyle Dunnigan as Walter Cronkite and Johnny Carson
- Sebastian Maniscalco as Chester Slink
- Beck Bennett as Barney Stein
- Cedric the Entertainer as Stu Smiley
- Fred Armisen as Mike Puntz of the FDA
- John Slattery as Ad Man #1 (Note: Implied to be his Mad Men character Roger Sterling)
- Jon Hamm as Ad Man #2 (Note: Implied to be his Mad Men character Don Draper)
- Aparna Nancherla as Purvis Pendleton
- Andy Daly as Isaiah Lamb, the devoutly Quaker mascot of the Quaker Oats Company
- Sarah Burns as Mrs. Schwinn
- Eleanor Sweeney as Cathy
- Bailey Sheetz as Butchie

Isaac Bae portrays George, the runaway to whom Bob tells the story. Rachael Harris appears as Bob's wife Anna.

Patrick Warburton appears as announcer Tom Terranova and Ken Narasaki plays Ralston Purina. Earthquake plays Cookie Rojas while Sasheer Zamata portrays reporter Beth Donovan. Michael Joseph Pierce portrays General Mills and Ronny Chieng plays a technician named Chuck.

Jeff Lewis, Cedric Yarbrough, and Alex Edelman play Big Yella, Toucan Sam, and Apple Head, respectively, while Ali Wentworth appears as an unidentified woman at Schwinn's funeral and Darrell Hammond plays Ed McMahon.

Spike Feresten voices the ravioli creature as a baby, while Seinfeld provides the voice of the teenaged creature. Seinfeld's wife Jessica Seinfeld makes a cameo appearance.

== Production ==
It was announced in June 2021 that Netflix had won the rights to the project. Jerry Seinfeld would direct, produce, co-write and star in the film, which is based on a joke he told about the creation of Pop-Tarts. In June 2022, Melissa McCarthy, Jim Gaffigan, Amy Schumer, Hugh Grant, and James Marsden were among the newest additions to the cast. Grant provided an audition tape for Seinfeld, being the first time he had done so in over 30 years. In August, Maria Bakalova was announced for a cameo appearance. In February 2024, it was revealed that Bill Burr and Dan Levy joined the cast.

Seinfeld co-wrote the film's screenplay along with writers, Spike Feresten, Andy Robin and Barry Marder, all of whom he previously worked with on Bee Movie (2007). The production was granted a tax credit to film in California in February 2022. Principal photography took place in mid 2022.

== Music ==
Christophe Beck composed the score for the film. Meghan Trainor and Jimmy Fallon provided a song for the film called "Sweet Morning Heat".

== Release ==
The film premiered at Grauman's Egyptian Theatre in Hollywood on April 30, 2024. The film was released on Netflix on May 3, 2024.

=== Promotion ===
To promote the film, Kellogg's and Netflix collaborated on a campaign called "Not brought to you by Pop-Tarts", including a mock legal threat, limited-edition packaging and a short film starring Jerry Seinfeld.

== Reception ==
=== Critical response ===
According to The Hollywood Reporter, the film received a "sharply divided reaction from critics". On the review aggregator website Rotten Tomatoes, 39% of 129 critics' reviews are positive, with an average rating of 4.8/10. The website's consensus reads: "Much like a preservative-packed toaster pastry, Unfrosted is sweet and colorful, yet it's ultimately an empty experience that may leave the consumer feeling pangs of regret." Metacritic, which uses a weighted average, assigned the film a score of 42 out of 100, based on 30 critics, indicating "mixed or average" reviews.

The Hollywood Reporter noted that reviews such as those from the "country's top critics at publications like The New York Times, Wall Street Journal, The Washington Post and San Francisco Chronicle gave the film modestly positive reviews," while Chicago Sun-Times, The Globe and Mail, The Daily Beast, and Collider were "downright scathing", with the Sun-Times calling Unfrosted "one of the decade's worst movies" that Seinfeld should have aborted halfway into production. Reviews such as those from The Guardian and THR itself were also "modestly positive".

In her review for the New York Times, Amy Nicholson finds, "The jokes spill forth so fast that there's no time for the shtick to get soggy." Variety reviewer Owen Gleiberman calls it "an agreeably flaked-out piece of surrealist vaudeville" and concludes "Unfrosted, in its way, is a quintessential comedian's movie. It thumbs its nose at everything without necessarily believing in anything. Yet it has an agreeable crunch."

In her The Hollywood Reporter review, Sheri Linden deems the film "a straight-up comedy — no therapeutic underpinnings or civic lessons — that's funniest when it isn't trying too hard" and praises behind-the-camera skill and talent, stating: "Buoyed by Christophe Beck's score, a midcentury world-of-tomorrow vibe infuses the proceedings. The exuberant playfulness of Clayton Hartley's production design and Susan Matheson's vibrant costumes is balanced by the formal restraint of William Pope's lensing."

The Globe and Mail found the film bereft of laughs and its runtime unendurably long, and The Daily Beast called it "as bad as you'd expect" but otherwise "superior" to Seinfeld's 2007 animated film Bee Movie. Collider compared Unfrosted poorly with Barbie as well as Tetris, Air, and Flamin' Hot—the former film the website cited for its deep social commentary and the other three for being "halfway decent biopics". The San Francisco Chronicle praised Seinfeld's direction as well as the performances and 1960s production design, while The Guardian called the film "amiable and funny in a way that's much harder to achieve than it looks". The Washington Post appreciated how the film landed more gags than missed them.

=== Accolades ===
Award	Date of ceremony	Category	Recipient(s)	Result	Ref.
ACE Eddie Awards	March 14, 2025	Best Edited Feature Film (Non-Theatrical)	Evan Henke	Nominated	
ADG Excellence in Production Design Awards	February 15, 2025	Excellence in Production Design for a Television Movie	Clayton Hartley	Won	
Golden Raspberry Awards	February 28, 2025	Worst Director	Jerry Seinfeld	Nominated	
Golden Raspberry Awards	February 28, 2025	Worst Actor	Jerry Seinfeld	Won	
Golden Raspberry Awards	February 28, 2025	Worst Supporting Actress	Amy Schumer	Won	
Golden Raspberry Awards	February 28, 2025	Worst Screen Combo	Any two unfunny "comedic" actors	Nominated	
Primetime Emmy Awards	September 8, 2024	Outstanding Television Movie	Andy Robin, Barry Marder, Cherylanne Martin, Jerry Seinfeld, Spike Feresten, and Beau Bauman	Nominated	
Producers Guild of America Awards	February 8, 2025	Outstanding Producer of Televised or Streamed Motion Pictures	Unfrosted	Nominated	
