= Jared Firestone =

Israeli-American skeleton racer (born 1990)

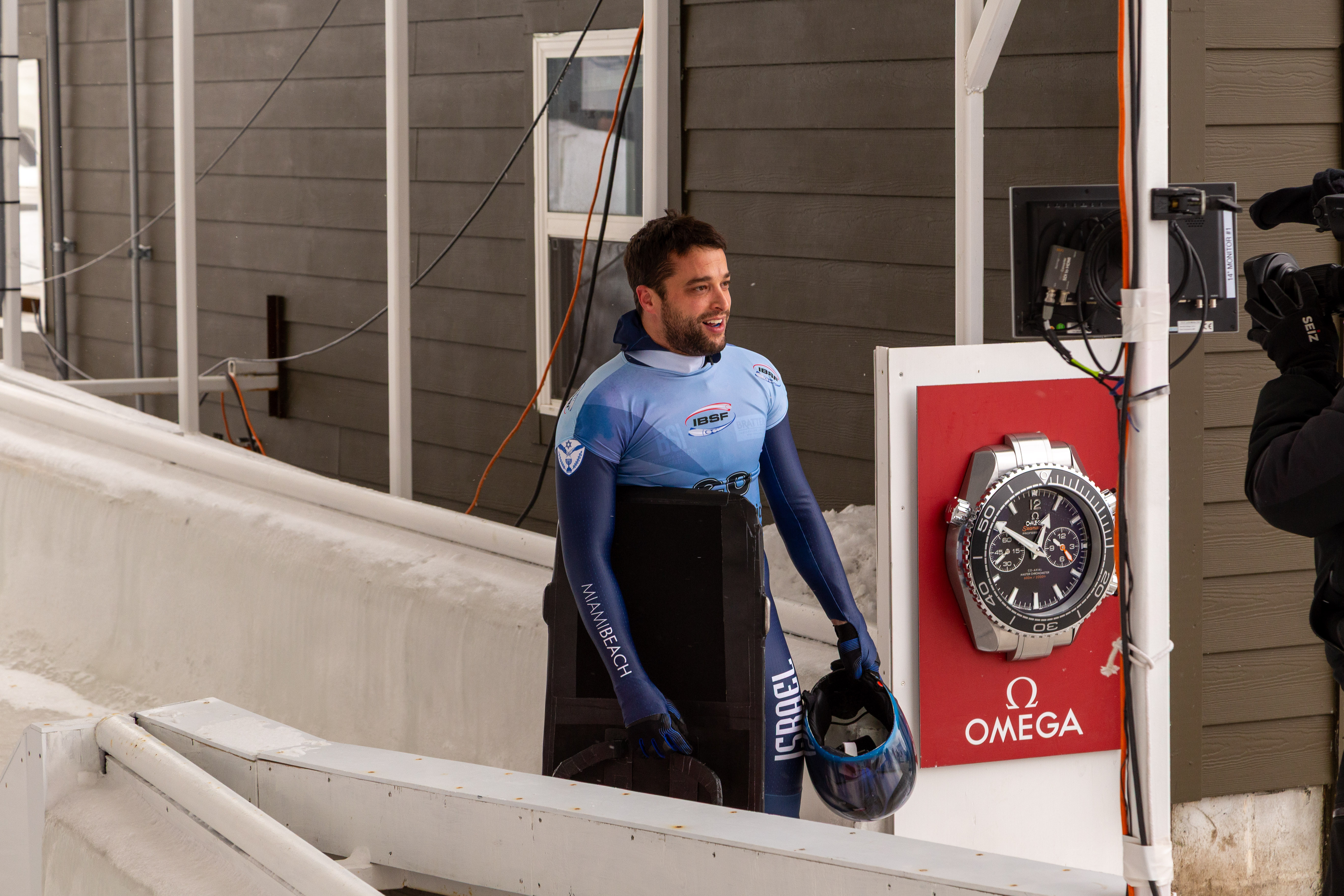
- Firestone at the IBSF World Championships 2025

Personal information
- Native name: ירד יוסף פיירסטון
- Full name: Jared Alec Firestone
- Nickname: The Jewish Jet
- National team: Israel national skeleton team
- Born: March 30, 1990 (age 36) Miami, Florida, U.S.
- Education: Tulane University; Benjamin N. Cardozo School of Law
- Years active: 2019–present
- Height: 1.72 m (5 ft 8 in)
- Weight: 81 kg (179 lb)
- Website: jewishjet.com

Sport
- Country: Israel
- Sport: Skeleton; bobsled
- Coached by: Self-coached

Jared Alec Firestone (Hebrew: ג’ארד יוסף פיירסטון; born March 30, 1990) is an American-born Israeli skeleton racer and a lawyer based in Florida.

He represents Israel's national bobsleigh team. Firestone qualified to represent Israel in skeleton at the 2026 Winter Olympics, scheduled to be held in Milan and Cortina d'Ampezzo, Italy.

In 2022, Firestone became the first Israeli to win gold in a skeleton race, and in March 2025 became the first Israeli finalist at the IBSF World Championships. He has eight podium finishes in IBSF competitions.

== Biography ==
Firestone was born and raised in South Florida. He attended Scheck Hillel Community School. Firestone competed in track and field at Tulane University before earning a J.D. degree from the Benjamin N. Cardozo School of Law. In 2021, Firestone and Adam Edelman co-founded a non-profit organization, Advancing Jewish Athletics. Firestone is nicknamed "The Jewish Jet".

== Sports career ==
=== Sliding sports ===
==== Skeleton ====
Firestone was introduced to skeleton in 2014, during his recovery from a transient ischemic attack suffered while in law school.

He debuted for Israel in 2019. Firestone's first World Cup season was 2019–20, during which he entered two events and placed 41st overall. He did not compete in the 2020–21 World Cup but returned for event in 2021–22, finishing 43rd overall.

In his early seasons, Firestone competed on the North American Cup circuit. By his third competitive season, he came within three places of qualifying for the 2022 Winter Olympics, finishing the year ranked 44th in the world by the International Bobsleigh & Skeleton Federation (IBSF).

In the 2022–2023 season, Firestone won Israel's first-ever gold medal in a sliding sport at an Olympic-discipline event.

During the 2024–2025 season, Firestone qualified Israel's first sled in a World Championship since 2019. He advanced to the finals, becoming the first Israeli athlete to reach that stage of a major sliding competition.
