= Adam Edelman =

Israeli athlete (born 1991)

Personal information
- Native name: אדם אדלמן
- Full name: Adam Jeremy Edelman
- Nicknames: A. J. The Hebrew Hammer
- National team: Israel Olympic Skeleton Team; Israel Bobsled Team
- Born: March 14, 1991 (age 35) Boston, Massachusetts, U.S.
- Education: Massachusetts Institute of Technology (BS); Yale University (MBA)
- Years active: 2014–2018 (skeleton); 2019–present (bobsled)
- Height: 1.78 m (5 ft 10 in)
- Weight: 83 kg (183 lb)
- Website: israelbobsled.team

Sport
- Country: Israel
- Sport: Skeleton; bobsled
Medal record
Men's skeleton
Representing Israel
| Event | 1st | 2nd | 3rd |
|---|---|---|---|
| National Championship | 4 | – | – |
| Total | 4 | 0 | 0 |
Men's Bobsled
Representing Israel
| Event | 1st | 2nd | 3rd |
|---|---|---|---|
| National Championship | 6 | – | – |
| Total | 6 | 0 | 0 |
| Event | 1st | 2nd | 3rd |
|---|---|---|---|
| IBSF North American Cup | - | 1 | 1 |
| North American Cup Circuit Overall | - | – | 1 |
| Total | 0 | 1 | 2 |

Adam Jeremy "A. J." Edelman OLY (Hebrew: אדם ג'רמי אדלמן; born March 14, 1991) is an American-born Israeli sliding sports athlete. He is the first Israeli to qualify for the Olympics in two different sports, and the first Orthodox Jew to compete in the Winter Olympics. Edelman competed for Israel in the skeleton competition at the 2018 Winter Olympics in Pyeongchang, South Korea, and competed at the Milano Cortina 2026 Olympics in the bobsleigh.

== Biography ==
Edelman was born in Boston, Massachusetts, and grew up in Brookline, Massachusetts. He was raised in a Modern Orthodox Jewish home by parents Cheryl (a lawyer) and Elazer Edelman (an engineer, scientist, and cardiologist). He is the middle of three boys. His older brother is comedian Alex Edelman who helped found Off the Wall Comedy in Jerusalem. He is a dual American-Israeli citizen.

Edelman graduated from the Massachusetts Institute of Technology in 2014 with a degree in mechanical engineering. He was a member of the MIT Men's hockey team and a staff editorial columnist for the MIT newspaper, The Tech. MIT President Rafael Reif's 2018 commencement address used Edelman's Olympic journey as a basis of his message to the graduating class.

Edelman immigrated to Israel in 2016 and trained at Wingate Institute. He is an MBA candidate at the Yale School of Management.

Edelman is nicknamed the "Hebrew Hammer."

Edelman has said he is a supporter of anti-bullying and mental health initiatives, and that his motivation for continuing in sport is largely a desire "to use my Olympic journey as a platform to promote further Jewish and Israeli involvement in sport."

During the 2026 Winter Olympics, Edelman maintained a kosher diet and said that he regarded competing in bobsleigh on Shabbat as compatible with his observance, while noting that he had not sought a rabbinic ruling on the question.

== Sports career ==
=== Hockey ===
Edelman's first sport was ice hockey, which he began playing at age three, as a goaltender. He continued to play hockey through high school for the Brookline Warriors hockey team and at MIT, where he was the program's first ever sabbath observant player. Edelman helped the MIT Engineers win two divisional championships in the Northeast Collegiate Hockey Association (NECHA) Division II league.

=== Bodybuilding ===
Edelman competed as an NGA accredited bodybuilder, placing in a top-3 medal finish at the 2014 NGA Annapolis Bodybuilding Championships.

=== Olympic sliding sports ===
==== Skeleton ====
Edelman tried skeleton for the first time at the Olympic facilities in Lake Placid, NY in March 2014 where he was given an assessment that he would never be competitive. The Israeli team was similarly told that Edelman would "get down the track but that’ll be the most of it." Nevertheless, Edelman set out a goal of qualifying for the 2022 Olympics. Lacking funds, Edelman could not afford a coach and was self-taught. He reinforced his learning of the sport by watching nearly 12 hours of YouTube video daily.

In his first race at the 2014 North American Cup, Edelman finished 18.64 seconds behind the race winner, and after hearing another athlete indicate that given his poor performance Edelman would quit within 2 years, decided to focus on making the 2018 Olympics, rather than 2022. In the 2018 Olympic qualification season, Edelman had cut this deficit to 1.19 seconds, placing ninth.

In 2016, he decided to quit the sport and return to work, but changed his mind at the last minute and decided to train full-time, resigning from his job as a product manager at Oracle.

Edelman entered the final days of 2018 Olympic qualification outside of qualification position, needing two medal performances in the Lake Placid North American Cup races to jump up the ranking table. He secured Israel's first sliding sport Olympic berth by earning a fifth place medal in both races.

Edelman competed for Israel at the 2018 Winter Olympics in PyeongChang, South Korea, finishing in 28th place.

Edelman competed in two World Championships for Israel, and retired from skeleton as Israel's most decorated slider, winning four Israeli national titles and two medals in IBSF-sanctioned international competition, the most of any Israeli sliding sport athlete.

==== Bobsleigh ====
Post-skeleton, Edelman unsuccessfully attempted to qualify an Israeli bobsled team for the 2022 Beijing Olympics.

In 2023, five of Edelman's teammates were drafted to serve in the Israel Defense Forces in the Gaza War. Edelman strung together a season by bringing in new athletes in each race for the IBSF North American Circuit, ultimately winning Israel's first ever sanctioned bobsleigh podium.

Edelman successfully qualified a team for the 2026 Winter Olympics, after the UK decided to send only one team, not two.

Edelman and the team reported on February 7, 2026, that their apartment in Cortina d'Ampezzo at the 2026 Winter Olympics had been burglarized. He said that "suitcases, shoes, equipment, passports" were stolen. Italian police have begun to investigate.

In the two-man bobsleigh competition, Edelman's team placed last out of 26 teams. During the Israeli team's run in the bobsleigh event, commentator Stefan Renna of Radio Télévision Suisse criticized Edelman for statements Renna characterized as supporting the genocide in Gaza, and questioned why Edelman was allowed to compete, while Vladyslav Heraskevych was disqualified for wearing a helmet memorializing Ukrainian soldiers. RTS later said of Renna's commentary, "Although this is factual information, it is inappropriate in the context of a sports commentary because it is too detailed", and removed the segment from public availability.

In the four-man bobsleigh competition, Edelman's team ranked 24th of 27 after two heats. Before the third heat, a team member admitted to Olympic Committee of Israel (OCI) that he had lied about an injury in an attempt to allow a substitute, Druze athlete Ward Fawarseh, to take his place for the third heat, a substitution which would not be allowed absent an injury. As a result of this admission, the team was withdrawn from the competition, and it did not start the third heat.

== Awards ==
Edelman is a recipient of Jew in the City's Orthodox Jewish All Star award. He was named a 2021 European Forbes 30 Under 30 in the Sports and Games category for his efforts of using his platform to campaign against bullying and increase LGBTQ participation in sport.
