= Matthew Nugent =

American biochemist

- Born: September 30, 1961 (age 64); Boston, U.S.
- Known for: vascular biology, polypeptide growth factors, heparan sulfate proteoglycans
- Scientific career
- Workplaces: Towson University; University of Massachusetts Lowell; Boston University Medical School

Matthew Nugent is an American scientist, biochemist, cell biologist, and educator. He is the Dean of the Jess & Mildred Fischer College of Science and Mathematics at Towson University where he is also Professor of Biological Sciences..

== Background and education ==
Nugent earned his bachelors and PhD degrees in Biochemistry at Brandeis University. Following his PhD, he was a postdoctoral fellow at the Massachusetts Institute of Technology under the guidance of Professors Robert S. Langer and Elazer R. Edelman where he studied vascular biology.

== Professional career ==
Nugent was appointed assistant professor of biochemistry and ophthalmology at Boston University Medical School in 1993. Nugent was appointed Research Director of the Department of Ophthalmology and professor of biomedical engineering at Boston University in 2006. Nugent was appointed associate dean for research, innovation and partnerships in 2017 in the Kennedy College of Sciences at University of Massachusetts Lowell.. In 2023 Nugent joined Towson University as dean and professor.

=== Children's books ===
Nugent published four children's books called the Goose Rocks Tales. The books are set in Kennebunkport, Maine and were illustrated by his mother, Louise Nugent

== Awards and honors ==
He is the author of more than 125 peer-reviewed publications and 5 book chapters. He received the Educator of the Year in Graduate Sciences award from Boston University Medical School in 2013
