= Nga (Javanese) =

nga
- ꦔ
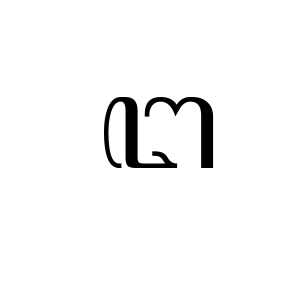
- Aksara nglegena

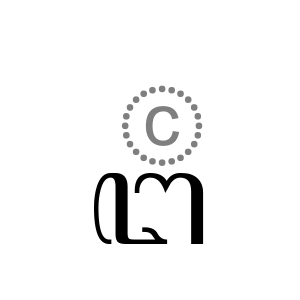
- Aksara pasangan

Usage
- Writing system: Javanese script
- Latin orthography: nga
- Sound values: [ŋ]
- In Unicode: A994

ꦔ is one of the syllables in the Javanese script that represents the sounds /ŋɔ/, /ŋa/. It is transliterated to Latin as "nga", and sometimes in Indonesian orthography as "ngo". It has another form (pasangan), which is ◌꧀ꦔ, but represented by a single Unicode code point, U+A994.

== Pasangan ==
Its pasangan form ◌꧀ꦔ, is located on the bottom side of the previous syllable.

== Extended form ==
The letter ꦔ does not have a murda form.

ꦔ with a cerek (ꦅ) is called I Kawi.

== Final consonant ==
ꦔ cannot became final consonant (e.g. ꦔ꧀). It is replaced by the cecak (ꦁ). For example: ꦕꦕꦶꦁ - cacing (worm), not ꦕꦕꦶꦔ꧀

== Glyphs ==
Nglegena forms				Pasangan forms			
ꦔ nga	ꦔꦃ ngah	ꦔꦁ ngang	ꦔꦂ ngar	◌꧀ꦔ -nga	◌꧀ꦔꦃ -ngah	◌꧀ꦔꦁ -ngang	◌꧀ꦔꦂ -ngar
ꦔꦺ nge	ꦔꦺꦃ ngeh	ꦔꦺꦁ ngeng	ꦔꦺꦂ nger	◌꧀ꦔꦺ -nge	◌꧀ꦔꦺꦃ -ngeh	◌꧀ꦔꦺꦁ -ngeng	◌꧀ꦔꦺꦂ -nger
ꦔꦼ ngê	ꦔꦼꦃ ngêh	ꦔꦼꦁ ngêng	ꦔꦼꦂ ngêr	◌꧀ꦔꦼ -ngê	◌꧀ꦔꦼꦃ -ngêh	◌꧀ꦔꦼꦁ -ngêng	◌꧀ꦔꦼꦂ -ngêr
ꦔꦶ ngi	ꦔꦶꦃ ngih	ꦔꦶꦁ nging	ꦔꦶꦂ ngir	◌꧀ꦔꦶ -ngi	◌꧀ꦔꦶꦃ -ngih	◌꧀ꦔꦶꦁ -nging	◌꧀ꦔꦶꦂ -ngir
ꦔꦺꦴ ngo	ꦔꦺꦴꦃ ngoh	ꦔꦺꦴꦁ ngong	ꦔꦺꦴꦂ ngor	◌꧀ꦔꦺꦴ -ngo	◌꧀ꦔꦺꦴꦃ -ngoh	◌꧀ꦔꦺꦴꦁ -ngong	◌꧀ꦔꦺꦴꦂ -ngor
ꦔꦸ ngu	ꦔꦸꦃ nguh	ꦔꦸꦁ ngung	ꦔꦸꦂ ngur	◌꧀ꦔꦸ -ngu	◌꧀ꦔꦸꦃ -nguh	◌꧀ꦔꦸꦁ -ngung	◌꧀ꦔꦸꦂ -ngur
ꦔꦿ ngra	ꦔꦿꦃ ngrah	ꦔꦿꦁ ngrang	ꦔꦿꦂ ngrar	◌꧀ꦔꦿ -ngra	◌꧀ꦔꦿꦃ -ngrah	◌꧀ꦔꦿꦁ -ngrang	◌꧀ꦔꦿꦂ -ngrar
ꦔꦿꦺ ngre	ꦔꦿꦺꦃ ngreh	ꦔꦿꦺꦁ ngreng	ꦔꦿꦺꦂ ngrer	◌꧀ꦔꦿꦺ -ngre	◌꧀ꦔꦿꦺꦃ -ngreh	◌꧀ꦔꦿꦺꦁ -ngreng	◌꧀ꦔꦿꦺꦂ -ngrer
ꦔꦽ ngrê	ꦔꦽꦃ ngrêh	ꦔꦽꦁ ngrêng	ꦔꦽꦂ ngrêr	◌꧀ꦔꦽ -ngrê	◌꧀ꦔꦽꦃ -ngrêh	◌꧀ꦔꦽꦁ -ngrêng	◌꧀ꦔꦽꦂ -ngrêr
ꦔꦿꦶ ngri	ꦔꦿꦶꦃ ngrih	ꦔꦿꦶꦁ ngring	ꦔꦿꦶꦂ ngrir	◌꧀ꦔꦿꦶ -ngri	◌꧀ꦔꦿꦶꦃ -ngrih	◌꧀ꦔꦿꦶꦁ -ngring	◌꧀ꦔꦿꦶꦂ -ngrir
ꦔꦿꦺꦴ ngro	ꦔꦿꦺꦴꦃ ngroh	ꦔꦿꦺꦴꦁ ngrong	ꦔꦿꦺꦴꦂ ngror	◌꧀ꦔꦿꦺꦴ -ngro	◌꧀ꦔꦿꦺꦴꦃ -ngroh	◌꧀ꦔꦿꦺꦴꦁ -ngrong	◌꧀ꦔꦿꦺꦴꦂ -ngror
ꦔꦿꦸ ngru	ꦔꦿꦸꦃ ngruh	ꦔꦿꦸꦁ ngrung	ꦔꦿꦸꦂ ngrur	◌꧀ꦔꦿꦸ -ngru	◌꧀ꦔꦿꦸꦃ -ngruh	◌꧀ꦔꦿꦸꦁ -ngrung	◌꧀ꦔꦿꦸꦂ -ngrur
ꦔꦾ ngya	ꦔꦾꦃ ngyah	ꦔꦾꦁ ngyang	ꦔꦾꦂ ngyar	◌꧀ꦔꦾ -ngya	◌꧀ꦔꦾꦃ -ngyah	◌꧀ꦔꦾꦁ -ngyang	◌꧀ꦔꦾꦂ -ngyar
ꦔꦾꦺ ngye	ꦔꦾꦺꦃ ngyeh	ꦔꦾꦺꦁ ngyeng	ꦔꦾꦺꦂ ngyer	◌꧀ꦔꦾꦺ -ngye	◌꧀ꦔꦾꦺꦃ -ngyeh	◌꧀ꦔꦾꦺꦁ -ngyeng	◌꧀ꦔꦾꦺꦂ -ngyer
ꦔꦾꦼ ngyê	ꦔꦾꦼꦃ ngyêh	ꦔꦾꦼꦁ ngyêng	ꦔꦾꦼꦂ ngyêr	◌꧀ꦔꦾꦼ -ngyê	◌꧀ꦔꦾꦼꦃ -ngyêh	◌꧀ꦔꦾꦼꦁ -ngyêng	◌꧀ꦔꦾꦼꦂ -ngyêr
ꦔꦾꦶ ngyi	ꦔꦾꦶꦃ ngyih	ꦔꦾꦶꦁ ngying	ꦔꦾꦶꦂ ngyir	◌꧀ꦔꦾꦶ -ngyi	◌꧀ꦔꦾꦶꦃ -ngyih	◌꧀ꦔꦾꦶꦁ -ngying	◌꧀ꦔꦾꦶꦂ -ngyir
ꦔꦾꦺꦴ ngyo	ꦔꦾꦺꦴꦃ ngyoh	ꦔꦾꦺꦴꦁ ngyong	ꦔꦾꦺꦴꦂ ngyor	◌꧀ꦔꦾꦺꦴ -ngyo	◌꧀ꦔꦾꦺꦴꦃ -ngyoh	◌꧀ꦔꦾꦺꦴꦁ -ngyong	◌꧀ꦔꦾꦺꦴꦂ -ngyor
ꦔꦾꦸ ngyu	ꦔꦾꦸꦃ ngyuh	ꦔꦾꦸꦁ ngyung	ꦔꦾꦸꦂ ngyur	◌꧀ꦔꦾꦸ -ngyu	◌꧀ꦔꦾꦸꦃ -ngyuh	◌꧀ꦔꦾꦸꦁ -ngyung	◌꧀ꦔꦾꦸꦂ -ngyur

== Unicode block ==
Javanese script was added to the Unicode Standard in October, 2009 with the release of version 5.2.

Javanese^{[1]}^{[2]} Official Unicode Consortium code chart (PDF)
	0	1	2	3	4	5	6	7	8	9	A	B	C	D	E	F
U+A98x	ꦀ	ꦁ	ꦂ	ꦃ	ꦄ	ꦅ	ꦆ	ꦇ	ꦈ	ꦉ	ꦊ	ꦋ	ꦌ	ꦍ	ꦎ	ꦏ
U+A99x	ꦐ	ꦑ	ꦒ	ꦓ	ꦔ	ꦕ	ꦖ	ꦗ	ꦘ	ꦙ	ꦚ	ꦛ	ꦜ	ꦝ	ꦞ	ꦟ
U+A9Ax	ꦠ	ꦡ	ꦢ	ꦣ	ꦤ	ꦥ	ꦦ	ꦧ	ꦨ	ꦩ	ꦪ	ꦫ	ꦬ	ꦭ	ꦮ	ꦯ
U+A9Bx	ꦰ	ꦱ	ꦲ	꦳	ꦴ	ꦵ	ꦶ	ꦷ	ꦸ	ꦹ	ꦺ	ꦻ	ꦼ	ꦽ	ꦾ	ꦿ
U+A9Cx	꧀	꧁	꧂	꧃	꧄	꧅	꧆	꧇	꧈	꧉	꧊	꧋	꧌	꧍		ꧏ
U+A9Dx	꧐	꧑	꧒	꧓	꧔	꧕	꧖	꧗	꧘	꧙					꧞	꧟
Notes 1.As of Unicode version 17.0 2.Grey areas indicate non-assigned code points

== See also ==
- Nga (Indic)
