= Alex Edelman =

American stand-up comedian (born 1989)

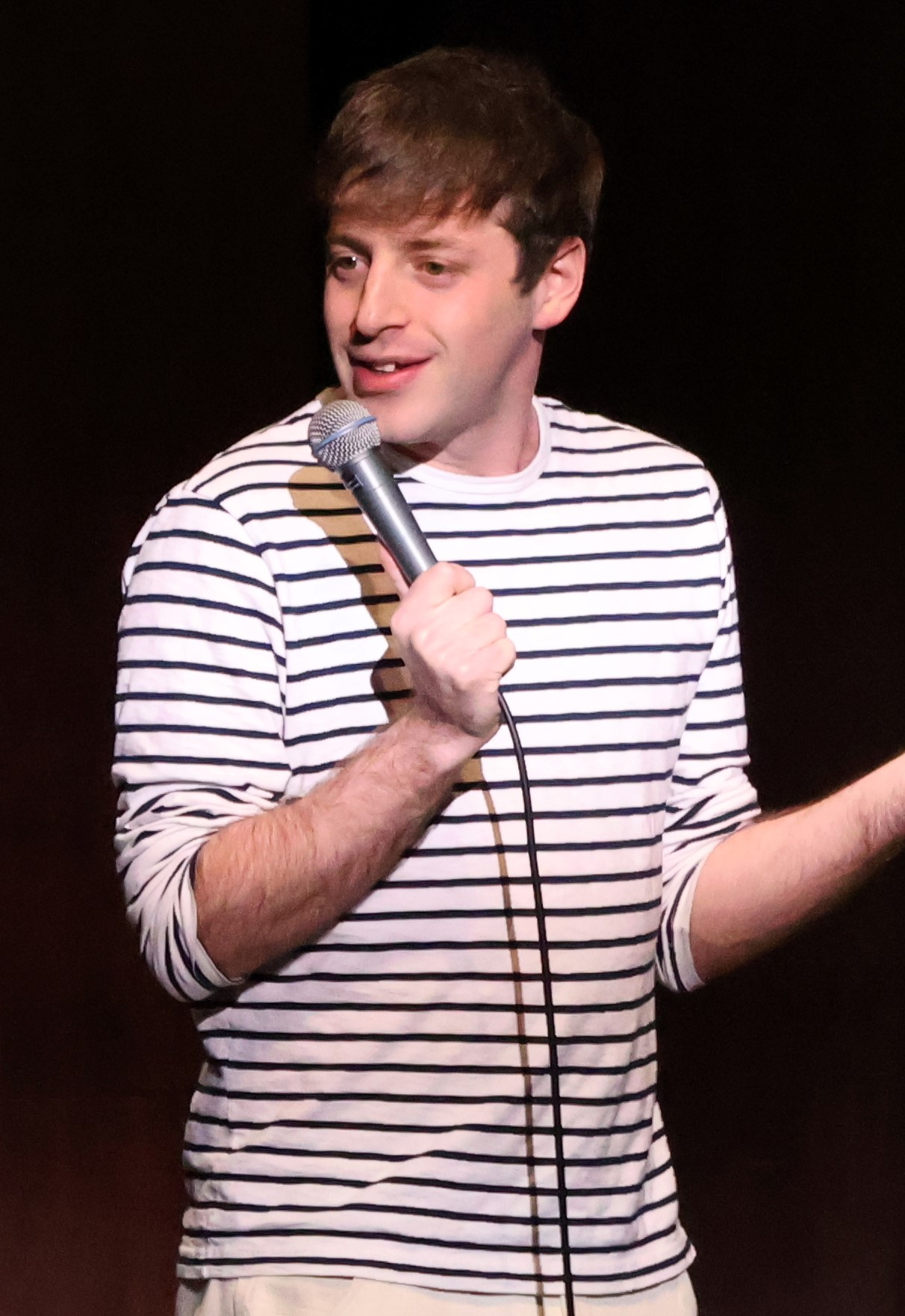
- Edelman performing in 2024
- Born: March 20, 1989 (age 37); Boston, Massachusetts, U.S.
- Education: New York University
- Parent: Elazer Edelman (father)
- Relatives: Adam Edelman (brother)
- Website: www.alexedelmancomedy.com

Alex Edelman (born March 20, 1989) is an American stand-up comedian, writer and actor. He was named Best Newcomer at the 2014 Edinburgh Festival Fringe for his show Millennial. He has toured three shows since 2014: Millennial (2014–2015), Everything Handed to You (2015–2016), and Just for Us (2018–2020; 2023–2024). Just for Us opened Off-Broadway in 2022 before premiering on Broadway in 2023 at The Hudson Theatre; it was named a NYT Critic's Pick both times and earned him a 2024 special Tony Award and an Emmy Award. In 2024, he was named to the Time 100 list of the world's most influential people.

== Biography ==
Edelman was born in Boston to Cheryl, a real estate lawyer, and Elazer R. Edelman, a biomedical engineer, cardiologist, and professor. He has two brothers, Austin, and Israeli Olympian Adam Edelman. He was raised in Brookline, Massachusetts. He began performing stand-up at age 15. He attended and graduated from Maimonides School in Brookline, a modern Orthodox Jewish day school. A baseball fan, he has worked for the Boston Red Sox and Los Angeles Dodgers.

Edelman grew up in a modern Orthodox Jewish family and, following high school, spent a year in a yeshiva in Jerusalem. During his time there, he helped to establish the city's first comedy club, Off the Wall Comedy. In 2008, he moved to New York City to study English at New York University and graduated in 2012. The photographer Mario Tama took his photo during graduation, which was featured in his special Millennial. During college, he continued to perform stand-up and later joined Upright Citizens Brigade. He first performed in the UK in 2012 while studying abroad. He made his Australian debut in 2015.

He described Shabbat, tefillin, and hosting large Passover seders with friends as continuing parts of his Jewish practice.

His show Millennial won the Edinburgh Comedy Award for Best Newcomer at the 2014 Edinburgh Festival Fringe, the first American to do so since Arj Barker won in 1997. Edelman's 2015 Edinburgh Fringe show was titled Everything Handed to You and was the second most well-reviewed show at that year's festival. His 2018 show, Just For Us, was nominated for the Best Show award at the Edinburgh Fringe. He has appeared in the UK on television shows such as The John Bishop Show, Alan Davies: As Yet Untitled, Live from the BBC, Roast Battle, and contributed several anecdotes about his experiences as a comedian to the 2015 book Off the Mic, by Deborah Frances-White and Marsha Shandur. He has done a BBC Radio 4 comedy series called Alex Edelman's Peer Group.

As a comedy writer, he has contributed to the American television shows The Great Indoors (2016–2017) and Teenage Bounty Hunters (2020). Edelman was the head writer for Saturday Night Seder, a virtual celebrity Passover seder held during the COVID-19 pandemic. He also trained rabbis to infuse humor into the High Holiday services as part of the Jewish communal response to the COVID-19 pandemic.

As an actor, Edelman starred as Adam Cooper in the Peacock mockumentary series The Paper, which is based on The Office. He is also credited as a writer on the series.

== Personal life ==
In Just for Us, Edelman quips, "If I was raised secular I would consider myself bisexual. But because I was raised religious, I consider myself straight with some secrets."

Edelman has dated Canadian comedian Katherine Ryan, actress Anna Kendrick, and actress Hannah Einbinder.

== Works ==
=== Shows ===
- Millennial (2014–2015)
- Everything Handed to You (2015–2016)
- Just for Us (2018–2020; 2023–2024)
- The Paper (2025–present)

=== Radio ===
- Millennial (2015) – BBC Radio 4
- Alex Edelman's Special Relationships (2018) – BBC Radio 4
- Alex Edelman's Peer Group (2017–2021) – BBC Radio 4

=== Specials and album ===
- Alex Edelman: Live at the BBC (2016) – Netflix UK; hour-long special
- Until Now (2020) – album
- Just for Us (2024) – MAX

=== Film ===
- Unfrosted (2024) — Netflix
- Magazine (2026)

== Awards and nominations ==
Year	Ceremony	Award	Work	Result
2014	Edinburgh Comedy Awards	Best Newcomer	Millennial	Won
2015	Leicester Comedy Festival	Best Show	Everything Handed to You	Nominated
2018	Melbourne International Comedy Festival Award	Best Show	Just for Us	Nominated
2018	Edinburgh Comedy Awards	Best Show	Just for Us	Nominated
2018	Herald Angel Award		Just for Us	Won
2022	Obie Award	Special Citation	Just for Us	Won
2024	Tony Awards	Special Tony Award	"Exemplary debut" in Just for Us	Honored
2024	Primetime Emmy Awards	Outstanding Writing for a Variety Special	Just For Us, HBO and Max	Won
