= Pop-Tarts =

Brand of toaster pastries

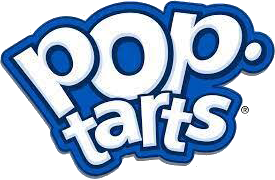

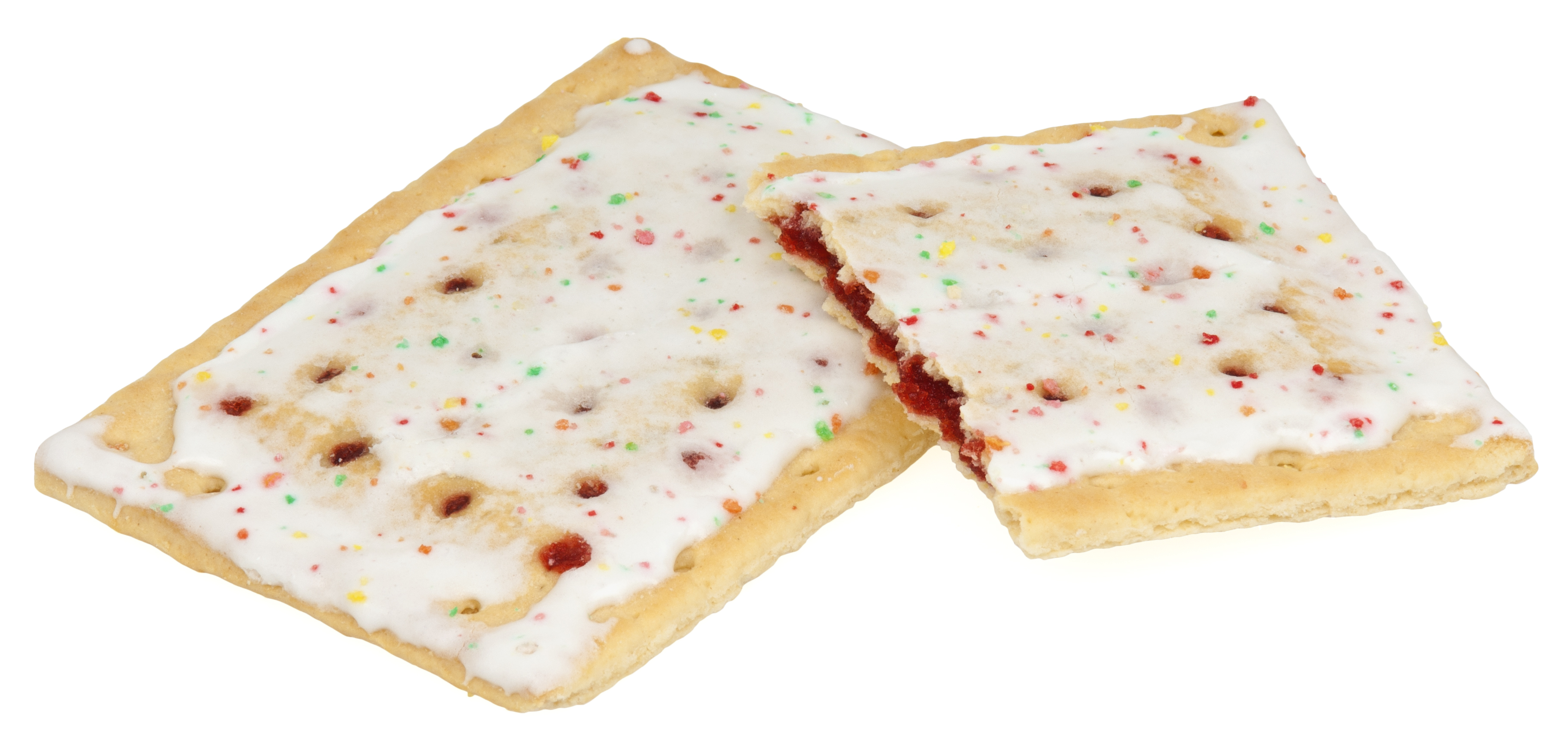
- Frosted Strawberry flavor Pop-Tarts.
- Product type: Toaster pastry
- Current owner: Kellanova
- Country: United States
- Introduced: September 14, 1964; 62 years ago
- Related brands: Pop-Tart Bites, Pop-Tart Crisps, Pop-Tart Cereal
- Markets: Worldwide
- Previous owners: Kellogg's (1964–2023)
- Tagline: "Crazy Good!"
- Website: poptarts.com

Pop-Tarts (stylized as pop•tarts) is an American brand of toaster pastries produced and distributed by Kellanova (formerly Kellogg's) since 1964. The pastry consists of a sweet filling sealed inside two layers of thin, rectangular pastry crust. Most varieties are also frosted. Although sold precooked, they are designed to be warmed inside a toaster or microwave oven. They are usually sold in pairs inside Mylar packages and do not require refrigeration. They are marketed primarily as a breakfast food, but (like sugar cereal) can be eaten as a sweet snack food.

Pop-Tarts is Kellanova's most popular brand to date in the United States, with millions of units sold each year. They are distributed mainly in the United States, but are also available in Canada and the United Kingdom.

Pop-Tarts are produced in dozens of flavors, plus various one-time, seasonal, and "limited-edition" flavors that appear for a short time.

== History ==
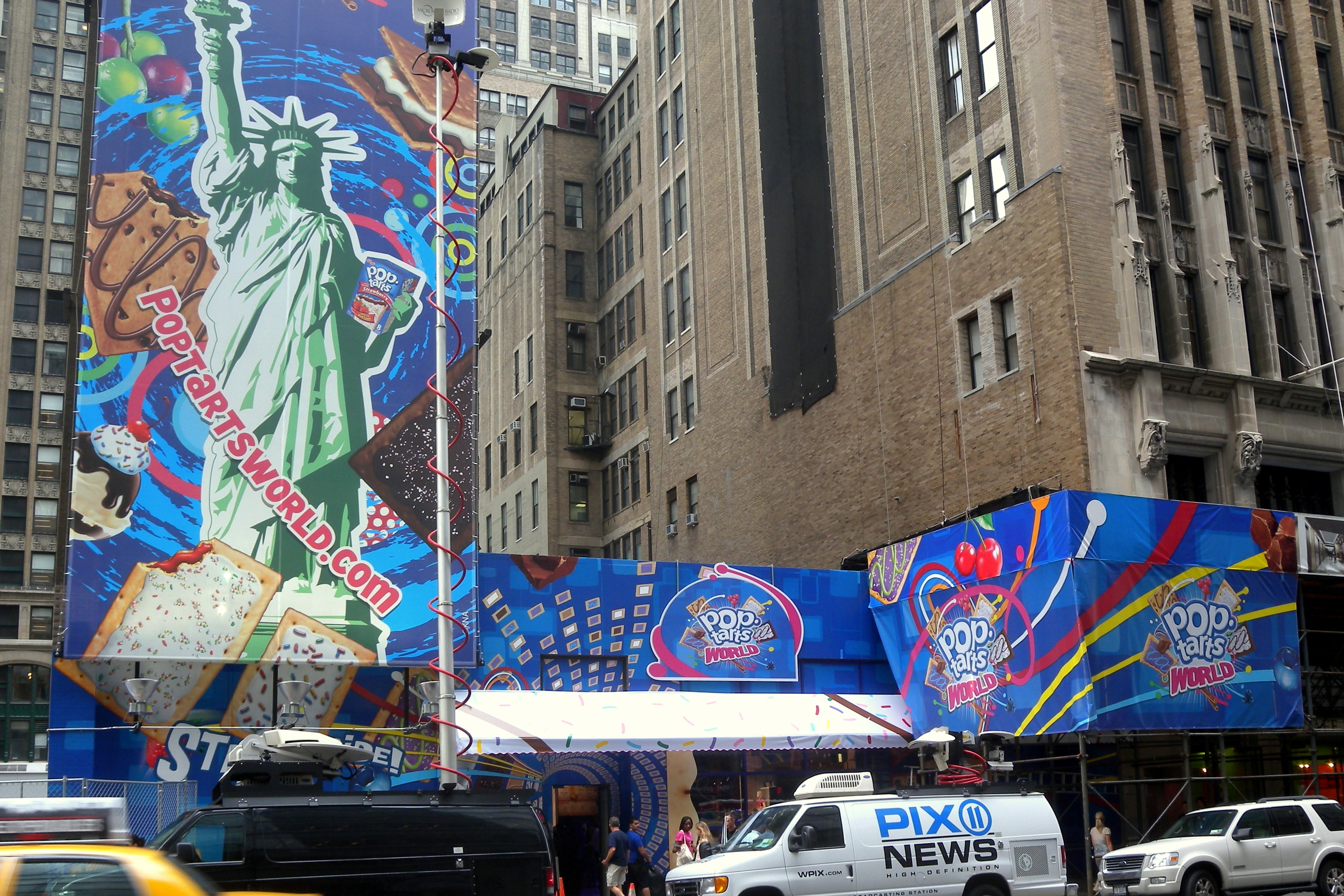
Pop-Tarts World, New York

In the early 1960s, Kellogg's biggest competitor, Post, invented a process for dehydrating food and enclosing it in foil to keep it fresh. Originally used for dog food, they were looking to expand their breakfast market and adapted the process to a new toaster-prepared breakfast pastry. Post announced its new product to the press in 1964 several months before they went to market, calling them "Country Squares"; they were eventually marketed as Post "Tostem Pop-Ups."

Because Post had revealed Country Squares before they were ready for the marketplace, Kellogg's rushed to develop their own version. They hired Bill Post, a former Keebler employee, for the task and created their own breakfast pastry in just four months. Initially called Fruit Scones, the name was soon changed to Pop-Tarts as a pun on the then popular Pop Art movement. The product became so popular that Kellogg could not keep up with demand. The first shipment of Pop-Tarts to stores sold out in two weeks, and Kellogg's ran advertisements apologizing for the empty shelves. This only increased demand.

The first Pop-Tarts came in four flavors: strawberry, blueberry, brown sugar cinnamon, and apple currant, which was soon renamed apple-berry. By 1966 there were six flavors—with the addition of raspberry-apple and concord grape—and all but brown sugar cinnamon were advertised as "made with Smucker's real fruit preserves or jelly." Originally unfrosted when first introduced in 1964,Kellogg's soon developed a frosting that could withstand the toaster, and the first frosted Pop-Tarts were released in 1967. Sprinkles were added to several flavors in 1968.

As of 2024, there are over 24 standard Pop-Tart flavors, including hot fudge sundae, s'mores, raspberry, and grape.

Pop-Tarts were introduced with fairly substantial marketing to the United Kingdom in the early 1990s. Chocotastic and Strawberry Sensation are available in most major UK supermarkets.

The United States military airdropped 2.4 million Pop-Tarts in Afghanistan during the initial attack in 2001.

A temporary store called Pop-Tarts World opened in Times Square on August 10, 2010 which included Pop-Tarts memorabilia, T-shirt making, a Pop-Tarts World Cafe featuring a sushi bar, and a vending machine called the Varietizer. The store closed on December 31, 2010.

As of 2014, sales of Pop-Tarts had increased for 32 straight years.

In 2023, Pop-Tarts became a product of Kellanova following the spinoff of Kellogg's breakfast cereal operations into WK Kellogg Co. Sales continued to increase year after year, topping $985 million in 2023.

== Products ==
Kellanova keeps between 20 and 30 flavors in production at any time.

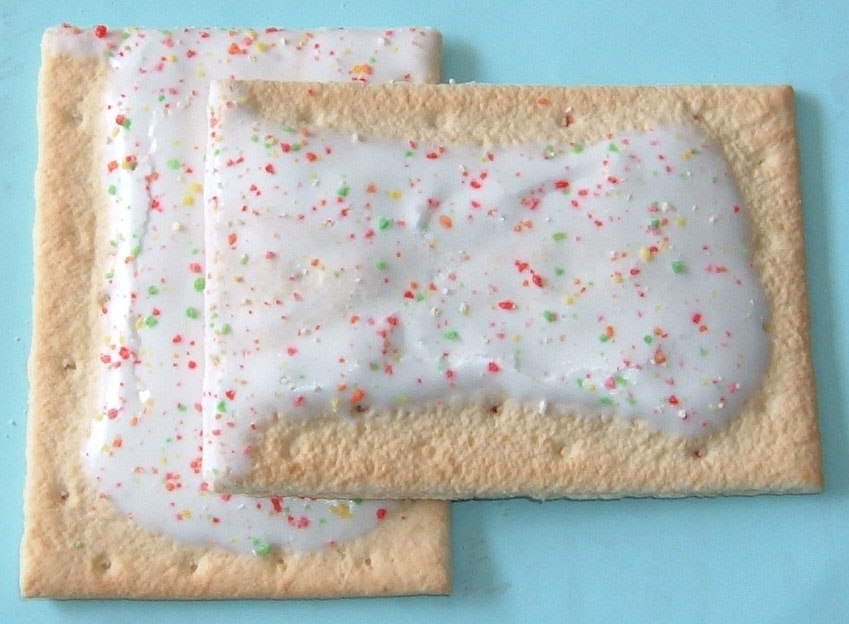
Frosted Strawberry.

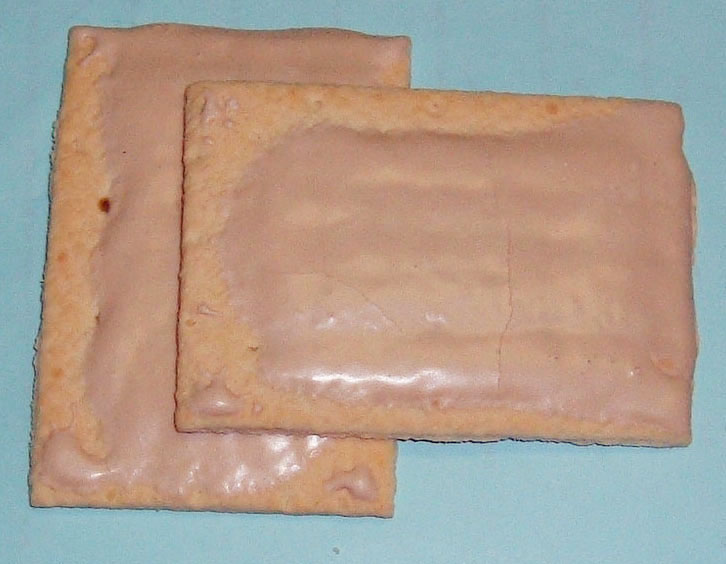
Brown Sugar Cinnamon.

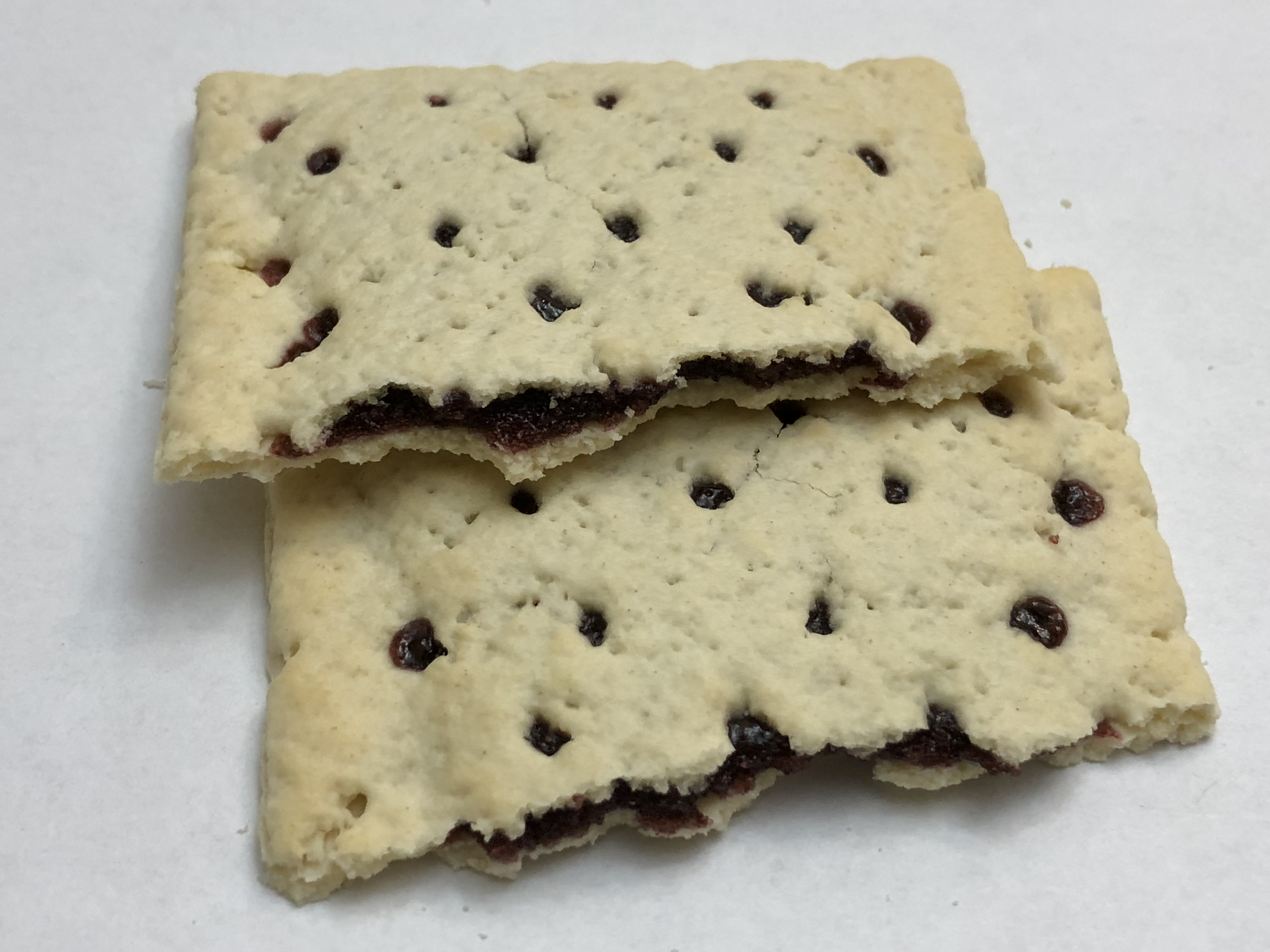
Unfrosted Blueberry.

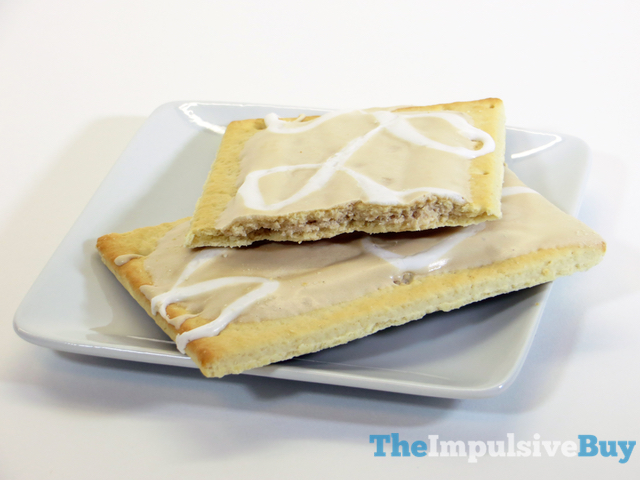
Dunkin' Donuts Vanilla Latte.

=== Standard flavors ===
Pop Tart's core flavors have been unchanged for over 50 years and include frosted strawberry and brown sugar cinnamon. In addition, Kellanova is constantly introducing new flavors into regular production and sometimes discontinues ones that did not perform well. The frosting that is used in Pop-Tarts contains beef gelatin.

=== Seasonal flavors ===
Kellanova produces some flavors for a short time every year, to coincide with seasonal or holiday events. Some examples include Pumpkin Pie, released every Fall since 2011, and Red White and Blueberry, brought back every summer since 2012.

=== Limited flavors ===
Between 2005–2021, Kellogg's produced special Limited flavors. These were each released for only a short time, about six months, and had a "Limited Edition" banner on the box. They were sometimes made in cooperation with another food brand, such as Dunkin' Donuts, Jolly Rancher, and A&W Root Beer. They have also worked with other Kellogg's brands to make Froot Loops and Eggo flavored Pop-Tarts.

Occasionally a limited flavor would sell so well that Kellogg's kept producing it longer or made it a standard flavor. Red Velvet was initially released as a limited flavor in 2013, but sold so well that it was kept in production until 2017. It returned as a standard flavor in 2021, but was quietly discontinued the next year.

In the summer of 2021, the Limited flavor "Mister-E" was discontinued shortly after its two-month marketing surge. Kellogg's pulled the plug on the flavor after receiving numerous complaints. It was confirmed to be known as "Everything Bagel" on the Pop-Tart website prior to its discontinuation.

=== Outside of the United States ===
A much more limited number of flavors are available outside the US. This is due to local laws that may prohibit the use of specific food dyes, or the use of high fructose corn syrup.

Only three flavors are available in Europe:

- Frosted Apple Blast
- Frosted Chocotastic
- Frosted Strawberry Sensation

== Related products ==
Danish Go-Rounds, later renamed Danish Rings, were an oval shaped tubular toaster pastry with fruit filling. Kellogg's made them between 1968–1972.

Presto Pizza was a pizza flavored toaster pastry produced by Kellogg's in 1971, and retired less than a year later.

Pastry Swirls were introduced in the mid-1990s and were similar to a competitor Pillsbury's Toaster Strudels. Pastry Swirls were bigger and thicker than regular Pop-Tarts and had less icing. Flavors included Cherry Cheese Danish and Cinnamon Cream. Sales were low, and the products were discontinued in 2001.

Snak-Stix, a portable break-apart version intended as an after-school snack for children, was introduced in 1999. In 2002, Kellogg's launched a massive media promotion along with the American Idol TV show and live tour. It did not sell well and was discontinued a year later.

Go-Tarts were another attempt at a snack-sized product, released in 2006. These were thicker, narrow, and wrapped individually (instead of in packages of two). Go-Tarts were discontinued in 2008 due to low sales.

Mini Crisps were introduced in 2011 as a bite-sized, cracker-like pastry with no filling. They originally sold in 60-calorie pouches but were discontinued after poor sales. They were brought back in a larger size in 2018, as Pop Tart Crisps. The newer version is a larger bar-sized crispy pastry with filling and frosting.

Pop-Tarts Pastry Bites are a smaller, bite-sized version sold in pouches. They were originally introduced in 1994 as Pop-Tarts Bites, but ceased production the next year. Kellogg's brought them back in 2018 in Frosted Strawberry and Brown Sugar Cinnamon flavors, with more flavors added in the following years.

Pop Tarts Cereal was originally made in 1994, and sold through the early 2000s. Kellogg's brought it back in 2019 with two flavors: strawberry and brown sugar cinnamon.

Crunchy Poppers were introduced in early 2024. They are a bite sized tubular pastry with filling and frosting, smaller and more crunchy than Pop Tarts Bites. They are sold in pouches of 10.

Pop Tarts Ice Cream Sandwiches were introduced in the summer of 2025. Originally they were sold only through Wal-Mart, but by the end of the year had expanded to other grocery outlets. Three flavors are made: strawberry, brown sugar cinnamon, and chocolate fudge.

== In popular culture ==
Jerry Seinfeld has had a routine about the transformational impact pop-tarts had on his childhood for many years. In June 2021, he announced he would write, direct, produce, and star in a fictionalized re-telling about the creation of Pop-Tarts. The film, Unfrosted, was released on Netflix on May 3, 2024.

The History Channel series The Food That Built America has two episodes that include Pop Tarts. The first episode of the first season includes the rivalry between the Kellogg and Post companies, and mentions the invention of the Pop-Tart. The first episode of season four goes into more detail about the creation of the Pop Tart and the rival Country Squares from Post.

The TV show Family Guy featured a song about Pop-Tarts, and how good they taste with butter.

Comedian Brian Regan includes Pop-Tarts in one of his most popular bits around how Pop-Tarts shouldn't require instructions.

== Advertising ==
In the 1970s, Kellogg's revitalized Pop-Tarts advertising with a talking toaster named Milton. The character, voiced by actor William Schallert in TV and radio ads, enjoyed a popular merchandising run. Products with Milton's likeness included mugs, plates, paint sets, and even board games.

Pop-Tarts introduced a new advertising campaign, "Crazy Good", in 2004. Characters that appeared often were a singing lizard and a group of children, dubbed "crazy-good kids", who commonly frightened the Pop-Tarts and caused them to be eaten or chased away. The sound design and signature "TaDa" opening and closings were created by Kamen Entertainment Group, Inc. The ads employ squiggly animation, surrealist humor, and non sequitur, all of which bear a strong resemblance to the signature work of animator Don Hertzfeldt. However, Hertzfeldt was not involved in any way with these advertisements.

In 2006, the Children's Advertising Review Unit (CARU) of the Council of Better Business Bureaus, prompted by a customer complaint, "recommended that Kellogg modify packaging, eliminate the phrase 'made with real fruit'." Kellogg agreed to do so, and redesigned packages for the Pop-Tarts line accordingly; they assured CARU that the "claim does not appear on television or print advertising" and offered to "participate in CARU's self-regulatory process" and "take CARU's focus areas into consideration" as Kellogg proceeds with its "future child-directed advertising."

In 2023, Kellanova started sponsoring the Pop-Tarts Bowl, a college football bowl game played at Camping World Stadium in Orlando, Florida. In 2023, a mascot of the strawberry Pop-Tart, went viral on social media after he descended into a massive toaster and was eaten by the winning team, Kansas State Wildcats, spurring countless memes over the internet. In 2024, the bowl held a fan vote of three flavors to serve as main mascot: Cinnamon Roll, Hot Fudge Sundae, and Wild Berry. After the Iowa State Cyclones defeated the Miami Hurricanes, MVP Rocco Becht chose Cinnamon Roll to be toasted and eaten.

Cable in the Classroom has used a Pop-Tarts television commercial as an example in its media literacy program for children. They ask adults to watch a Pop-Tarts commercial with their children or students and "have them look at how much product information is presented and how much is really about lifestyle or attitude."

The Pop-Tarts name is trademarked.

== Lawsuits ==
Thomas Nangle filed a lawsuit in 1992, suing Kellogg's for damages after his Pop-Tart became stuck in his toaster and caught fire. The case gained wider notoriety when humorist Dave Barry wrote a column about starting a fire in his own toaster with Pop-Tarts. Texas A&M University Corpus Christi professor Patrick Michaud performed a 1994 experiment showing that when left in the toaster too long, strawberry Pop-Tarts could produce flames to about 1.5 ft (46 cm) high. The discovery triggered a number of lawsuits. Since then, Pop-Tarts carry the warning: "Due to possible risk of fire, never leave your toasting appliance or microwave unattended."

In October 2021, a woman in New York sued Kellogg's for $5 million over what she claimed was misleading advertising about Strawberry Pop-Tarts. Her suit alleged, "The strawberry representations are misleading because the Product has fewer strawberries than consumers expect based on the labeling." This lawsuit was dismissed in March 2022, with US District Judge Marvin Aspin writing "The word 'Strawberry', combined with a picture of half of a strawberry and a Pop-Tart oozing red filling, does not guarantee that there will be a certain amount of strawberries in the product's filling."

== Recalls ==
Pop-Tarts have been the subject of recalls when mislabeling could lead to serious allergic reactions. On August 4, 1995, it was announced that 94,500 cartons of Smucker's Real Fruit Frosted Strawberry pastries actually contained the Chocolate Fudge variety. In 2002, Kellogg alerted the public that egg was an undeclared ingredient in its Frosted Brown Sugar Cinnamon Pop-Tarts. In 2006, they alerted the public that some Frosted Blueberry Pop-Tarts contained milk as an undeclared ingredient.

== See also ==
- Convenience food
- Pastries
- Toaster pastry
