= William Post (businessman) =

American inventor (1927–2024)

- Born: June 27, 1927; Grand Rapids, Michigan, U.S.
- Died: February 10, 2024 (aged 96); Grand Rapids, Michigan, U.S.
- Spouse: Florence Schut (m. 1948; died 2020)

William Post (June 27, 1927 – February 10, 2024) was an American businessman and inventor. Born to Dutch immigrants and raised in Michigan, Post became the plant manager for Hekman Biscuit company, a cookie company he worked for since he was sixteen years old. As plant manager, he was approached by Kellogg's to create a toaster pastry which later became known as the Pop-Tart, gaining credit for leading the team that invented the confection. He eventually became senior vice president of Keebler's until his retirement at age 56. After he retired, Post worked as a consultant and brand ambassador until 2003.

== Early life ==
Post was born on June 27, 1927, to Henry Post and Johanna Jongsta in Grand Rapids, Michigan. His parents were poor Dutch immigrants and his father worked as a truck driver, carrying out used ashes from coal furnaces. Post's family lived on the south side of Grand Rapids and he attended high school at Grand Rapids Christian High School. At the age of 16, Post washed trucks part-time for Hekman Biscuit Company, a cookie company which would later become part of Keebler. After graduating high school in 1945, he was drafted one year later into the US Army Air Corps and served in occupied Japan. When Post returned to Michigan, he attended Calvin College (Note: Now called Calvin University.) for two years then returned to his job at Hekman Biscuit Company. Post became the plant manager of the company at the age of 21, managing all aspects of the business.

== Pop-Tarts ==
In September 1963, Kellogg's approached Post asking if his plant could produce a toaster pastry to compete with rival Post Cereals (no relation) which was creating a pastry of their own. Although his boss did not take the idea seriously, he allowed Post to pursue the project. Post told Kellogg's he could have something in two weeks. Post and his team rapidly developed the recipe, which he refined by bringing samples home for his children to test almost daily. According to Post, he "had to break every rule in the book", developing about ten thousand samples in his laboratory by hand. The pastries were initially called "fruit scones" but the name was changed to "Pop-Tarts", an allusion to the pop art trend at the time. The first batch of Pop-Tarts was released to grocery stores in 1964 in Cleveland, Ohio, and quickly sold out.

In 1967, Post thought icing would be an ideal addition to the product. Some people at the company believed that toasting would cause the icing to melt, but it did not. That same year, Post moved to Illinois to work at Keebler's corporate office, eventually becoming senior vice president. He retired at the age of 56. He worked as a consultant and brand ambassador for Kellogg's for another 20 years. He helped develop a number of other products including Nutri-Grain bars and Rice Krispies Treats.

After Kellogg's acquired Keebler in 2001, Post and his wife moved back to Grand Rapids two years later. Throughout his life, Post maintained that the Pop-Tart's creation was a team effort, stating, "I assembled an amazing team that developed Kellogg's concept of a shelf-stable toaster pastry into a fine product that we could bring to market in the span of just four months".

== Later life ==
In his retirement, Post would visit schools to tell his story to students, telling them how he, the son of immigrants, attained success through hard work. According to his son, he would always tell students "If you want to be noticed, always do more than is expected". He would then give students samples from his unlimited supply of Pop-Tarts. He had a stockpile of them in his car, which had the license plate POPTART.

Post was married to his wife Florence for 72 years until her death in 2020. They had two children. Post died of heart failure on February 10, 2024, at the age of 96.
