= Hebrew Hammer =

Hebrew Hammer may refer to:

- Adam Edelman (born 1991), American-born Israeli Olympic skeleton athlete
- Randy Fine (born 1974), American politician from Florida
- Hank Greenberg (1911–1986), American baseball player
- Andy Gruenebaum (born 1982), American soccer player
- Gabe Kapler (born 1975), American baseball player
- Ido Pariente (born 1978), Israeli mixed martial artist
- Al Rosen (1924–2015), American baseball player
- Dudi Sela (born 1985), Israeli tennis player
- Cletus Seldin (born 1986), American boxer

== See also ==
- The Hebrew Hammer (film), a 2003 film directed by Jonathan Kesselman
