= Toaster Strudel =

Brand of toaster pastries

- Product type: Toaster pastry
- Current owner: General Mills
- Country: United States
- Introduced: 1985; 41 years ago
- Related brands: Toaster Scrambles
- Previous owners: Pillsbury Company
- Registered as a trademark in: July 28, 1992; 34 years ago
- Tagline: "Something better just popped up" and "Get Zem Göing"
- Website: Official website

Toaster Strudel is the brand name of a toaster pastry, prepared by heating the frozen pastries in a toaster and then spreading the included icing packet on top. The brand is historically notable for being stored frozen, due to innovations in 1980s food manufacturing processes.

== History ==
The Toaster Strudel is marketed under the Pillsbury brand, formerly of the Pillsbury Company. The product has found considerable success since being deployed in 1985 as competition with Kellogg's Pop-Tarts brand of non-frozen toaster pastries. In 1994, the company launched the advertising slogan "Something better just popped up". As of August 2013, the company increased the foreign branding, launching a brand ambassador character named Hans Strudel, and the new slogan of "Get Zem Göing". In 2001, General Mills acquired the Toaster Strudel product line with its purchase of Pillsbury. In 2023, General Mills used the advertising slogan, "Gooey. Flaky. Happy".

== Varieties ==
Toaster Strudels come in several flavors, with strawberry, blueberry, and apple flavors being the most common varieties. They also come in flavors such as cinnamon roll, chocolate, boston cream pie and some more. In 2020, the company released a limited-edition "Mean Girls" Toaster Strudel, which featured pink icing instead of the brand's traditional white icing.

== In popular culture ==
In the 2004 film Mean Girls, it was fictionally claimed that Gretchen Wieners' family fortune was due to her father's invention of the Toaster Strudel.

== See also ==
- Convenience food – Processed food designed for ease of preparation and consumption
- Pop-Tarts – Brand of toaster pastries
- List of snack foods by country
- Strudel – Type of layered pastry
