= Off the Wall Comedy Empire =

Comedy club in Jerusalem, Israel

- Formation: 2004
- Type: Comedy club
- Location: 34 Ben Yehuda Street (corner of King George Street), Jerusalem
- Website: www.israelcomedy.com

Off the Wall Comedy Empire (also known as Off the Wall Comedy Basement) is a comedy club started by American-born comedian David Klmnick and Jeremy Man Saltan in Jerusalem, in November 2004.

The club is located in the basement at 34 Ben Yehuda Street at the corner of King George Street, underneath the Hamashbir department store, in downtown Jerusalem, at the Little House in Baka, the former Olala Café. The club has had a number of comedians perform including Alex Edelman, Austen Tayshus, Baruch Benjamin Spier, Benji Lovitt, and Ari Louis.
