= Toast'em Pop Ups =

Brand of toaster pastries

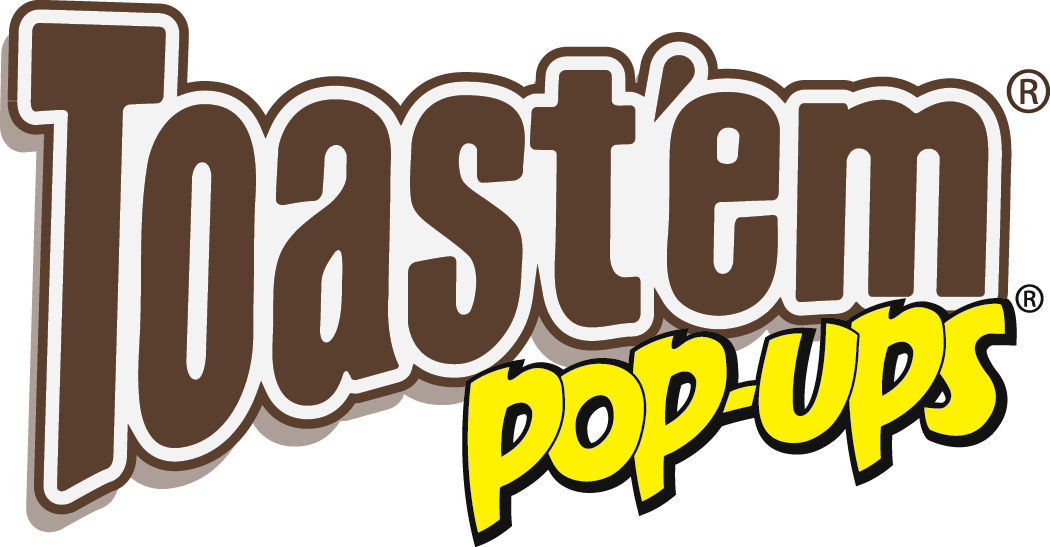
- Product type: Toaster pastry
- Current owner: Schulze and Burch Biscuit Company
- Country: U.S.
- Introduced: 1963; 63 years ago
- Markets: North America
- Previous owners: Post Holdings
- Website: www.toastem.com

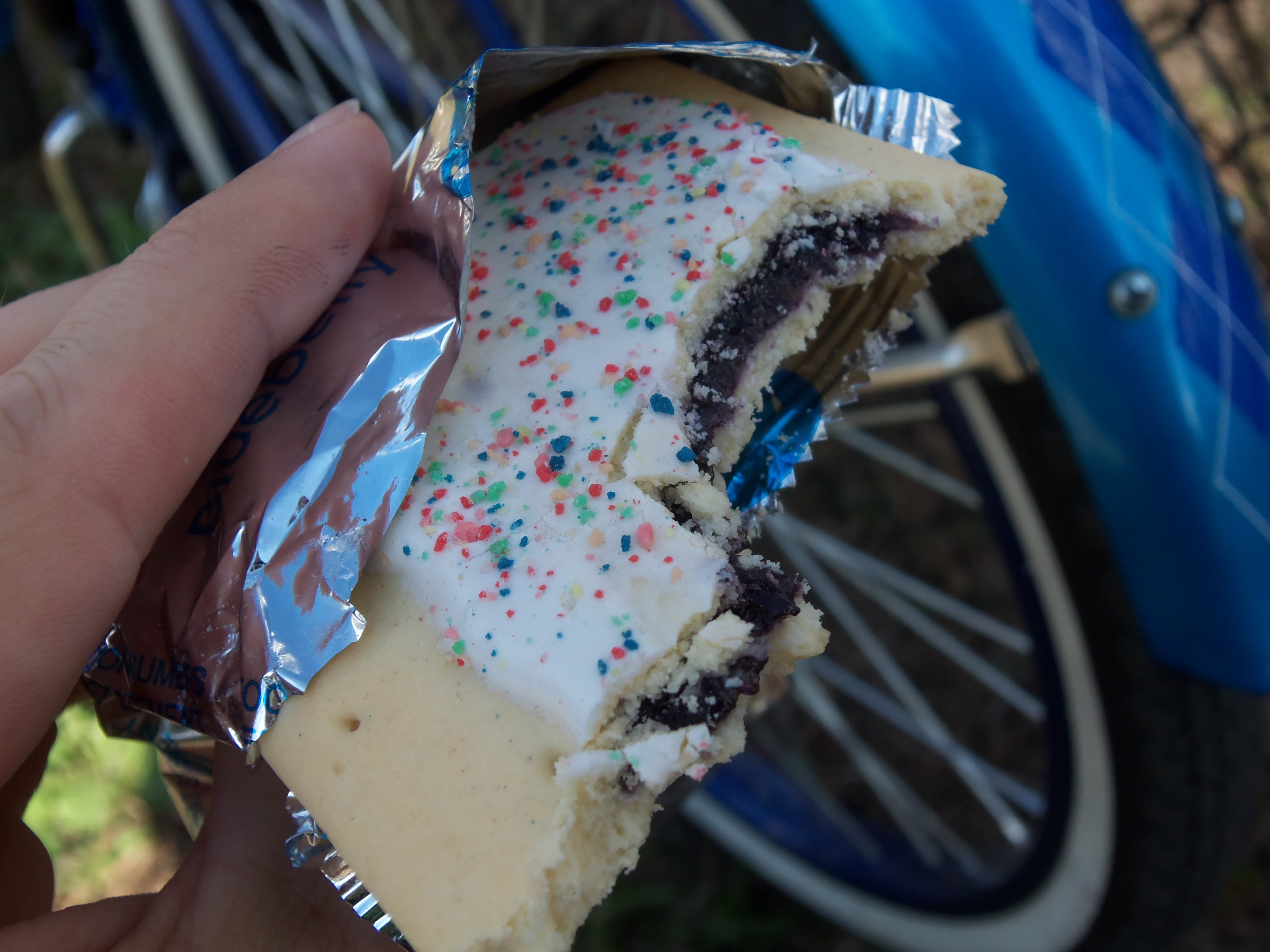
A blueberry filled Pop Up

Toast'em Pop Ups is a toaster pastry brand, currently produced by the Schulze and Burch Biscuit Company. They have a sugary filling sealed inside two layers of thin, rectangular pastry crust, coated in frosting. They are sold in pairs in Mylar wrapping, do not need refrigeration, and are typically heated in a toaster oven or toaster before eating.

== History ==
In 1963, Post invented a way to partially dehydrate foods to keep them from spoiling, by using foil (later, Mylar) wrappers. They initially used this for dog food, sold under the name Gaines Burgers. In February 1964, Post announced they would soon release a new breakfast pastry using this method, which they named Country Squares. However, the announcement came well ahead of the company's ability to produce and distribute the product, during which time rival Kellogg's was able to release their new product, Pop Tarts.

Country Squares sold very poorly compared to Pop Tarts, and Post changed the product's name to Toast'em Pop Ups in 1965. In 1971, Post sold the rights to the name and product to the Schulze and Burch Biscuit Company, which still produces Toast'em Pop Ups today.

== Products ==
Toast'em Pop Ups are currently produced in eight flavors, available throughout most of the U.S. and Canada. Since 2023, they have also been sold in France.

The 8 flavors include:

- Brown Sugar Cinnamon
- Blueberry
- Cherry
- Chocolate Fudge
- Cookies & Creme
- S'mores
- Strawberry
- Wild Berry
