= Elazer R. Edelman =

American engineer, scientist and cardiologist

Elazer Edelman
- Education: Massachusetts Institute of Technology (BS, MS, PhD); Harvard University (MD)
- Known for: Atherosclerotic arterial disease, vascular biology, drug delivery
- Children: 3, including Alex and Adam Edelman
- Scientific career
- Fields: Biomedical engineering Cardiology
- Workplaces: Massachusetts Institute of Technology; Harvard Medical School; Brigham and Women's Hospital
- Doctoral advisor: Robert S. Langer
- Other academic advisors: Morris Karnovsky

Elazer R. Edelman is an American engineer and cardiologist. He is the Edward J. Poitras Professor in Medical Engineering and Science at the Massachusetts Institute of Technology (MIT), where he directs the Center for Clinical and Translational Research (CCTR) and its Hub for Pediatric Innovations. He is also professor of medicine at Harvard Medical School, Program Director of the MIT Graduate Education in Medical Sciences program within the Harvard-MIT Division of Health Sciences and Technology, and a cardiac intensive care unit cardiologist at Brigham and Women's Hospital (BWH).

Edelman was elected as a member of the National Academy of Engineering in 2012 for contributions to the design, development, and regulation of local cardiovascular drug delivery and drug eluting stents. He is also a member of the American Academy of Arts and Sciences, National Academy of Inventors and the National Academy of Medicine.

== Background and education ==
Edelman was raised in the greater Boston area. He attended the Massachusetts Institute of Technology, where he received bachelor's degrees in Electrical Engineering and Computer Science (EECS) and in Applied Biology, and a master's degree in EECS. He earned his M.D. degree with distinction from Harvard Medical School and Ph.D. in Medical Engineering and Medical Physics within the Harvard-MIT Division of Health Sciences and Technology. He conducted his Ph.D. thesis work under the direction of Robert Langer to define the mathematics of regulated and controlled drug delivery. Edelman completed his medical training at Brigham and Women's Hospital and is board certified in internal medicine and cardiology. Following this, he spent six years as a research fellow under the tutelage of Prof. Morris J. Karnovsky to work on the biology of vascular repair. Edelman and his wife, Cheryl, have 3 children: Alex, A.J., and Austin.

== Research ==
Edelman is a major advocate of multidisciplinary research. Through his research centers, he combines teams of clinicians, engineers, and scientists from both academia and industry to create highly effective and clinically relevant solutions to medical problems. Through this approach, Edelman and his students have been credited as some of the key contributors and pioneers of the coronary stent. They critically aided in the development, characterization, and optimization of the first bare-metal stents and subsequent iterations including drug-eluting stents. Edelman's research programs fall in the following general categories:

- polymer-based controlled and modulated drug delivery
- vascular biology, glycobiology, and growth factor biochemistry
- tissue engineering
- biomaterials and tissue interactions
- device biology

== Awards and honors ==
Edelman has authored or co-authored more than 900 original scientific publications, holds some 120 patents, and has trained more than 400 students and post-doctoral fellows. He has served on several advisory boards including the Science Board to the Food and Drug Administration.

Edelman has been elected a fellow of the Association of American Physicians, American College of Cardiology, American Heart Association, American Institute for Medical and Biological Engineering, American Society for Clinical Investigation, American Society of Mechanical Engineers, Association of University Cardiologists, American Academy of Arts and Sciences, National Academy of Engineering, National Academy of Medicine, and National Academy of Inventors. He received the Officer's Cross of the Spanish Order of Civil Merit in 2010. He is currently the Chief Scientific Advisor for the journal Science Translational Medicine.

Selected awards received by Edelman include:

- 2026: James R. Killian Jr. Faculty Achievement Award (MIT)
- 2025: Awardee, Koch Institute 2025 Image Awards, Koch Institute, Cambridge, MA
- 2024: Awardee, “Make Your Medical Device Pitch for Kids!” - Alliance for Pediatric Device Innovation (APDI), The MedTech Conference, Toronto, Canada
- 2020: SMRA Best Clinical Science Award for abstract and presentation
- 2019: Excellence in Mentoring Award, Corrigan Minehan Heart Center, Massachusetts General Hospital
- 2018: Distinguished Scientist Award, American College of Cardiology
- 2017: Career Achievement Award, Transcatheter Cardiovascular Therapeutics (TCT)
- 2016: Plenary Lecture, Royal Academy of Medicine in Ireland Bioengineering Section
- 2015: Flexner Discovery Lecturer, Vanderbilt University Medical Center
- 2015: Massimo Calabresi Lecturer, Yale University
- 2015: Dean's Distinguished Lecture, Weill Cornell Medical School
- 2014: Lifetime Achievement Award, International Conference on Innovation
- 2014: Clemson Award for Basic Research, The Society for Biomaterials
- 2012: Hollingsworth Distinguished Lecturer, University of Texas at Austin Department of Biomedical Engineering, Cockrell School
- 2011: Lewis Katz Visiting Professorship in Cardiovascular Research, Columbia University
- 2010: Officer's Cross of the Spanish Order of Civil Merit
- 2009: Jeffrey M. Hoeg Arteriosclerosis, Thrombosis and Vascular Biology Award for Basic Science and Clinical Research
- 2007: A. Clifford Barger Excellence in Mentoring Award
- 2006: American Society for Testing and Materials (ASTM) Joseph S. Barr Award
- 1992: Marcus Award, American Heart Association
- 1982: Soma Weiss Award, Harvard Medical School

== Personal life ==
Edelman is married to Cheryl, a real estate lawyer, and lives in Brookline, Massachusetts. He has three sons, Austin, Israeli Olympian Adam Edelman, and comedian Alex Edelman.
