= Toaster pastry =

Type of pastry, typically toasted and store-bought

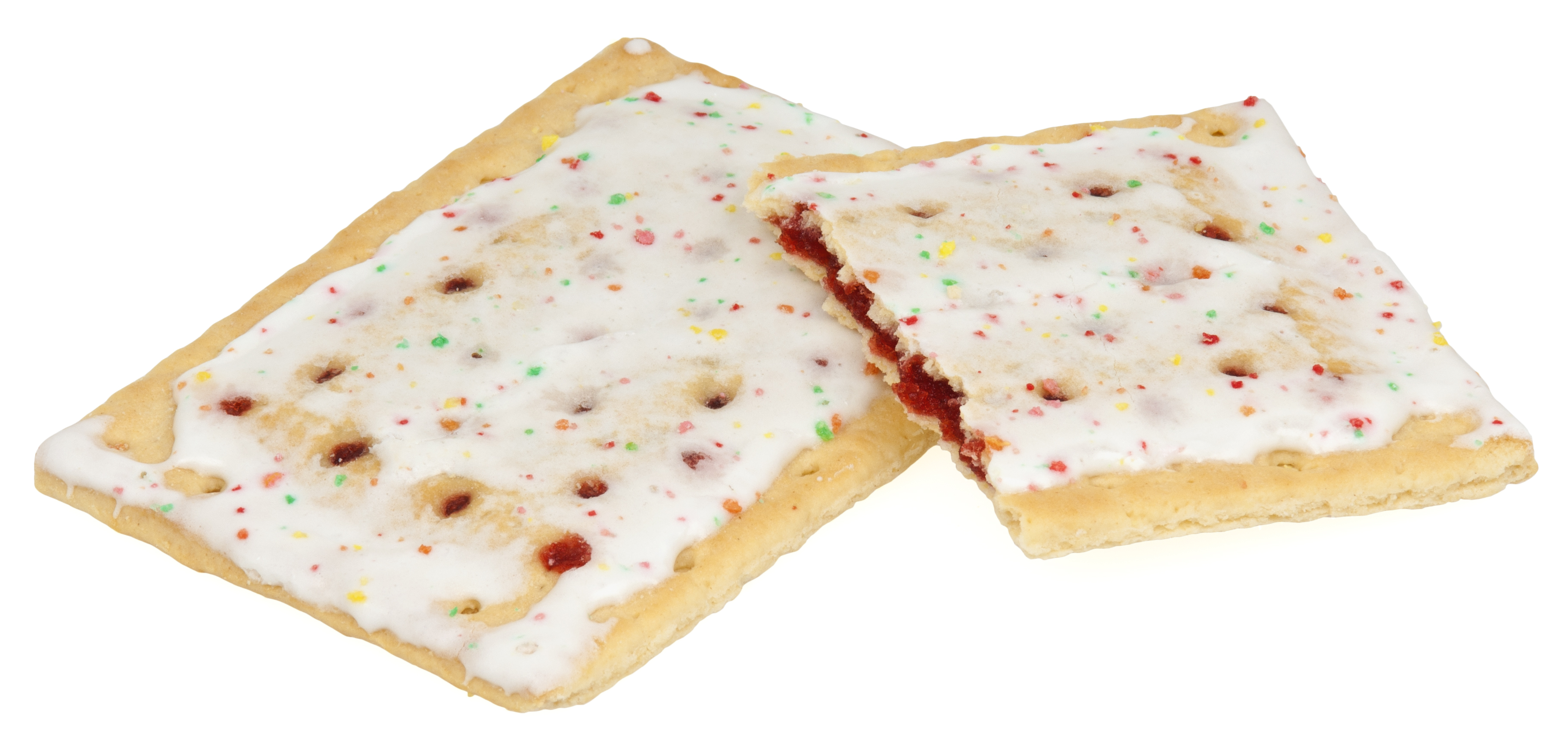
- Strawberry Pop-Tarts, an example of toaster pastries
- Type: Pastry
- Course: Dessert snack or breakfast
- Created by: Nabisco & Kellogg's
- Invented: 1964

A toaster pastry is a type of bakers' confection. They are thin rectangles often made of rice bran, molasses, flour, syrup, and shortening, which on one side usually has a coating of icing that has been dried with starch. They contain sweet, syrupy fillings, often fruit preserves or other flavoring ingredients such as chocolate or cinnamon. As the name suggests, toaster pastries are often heated in a toaster or oven. They are already fully cooked however, and may be eaten unheated as well.

== Brands ==
The following list includes some popular brands of toaster pastries:

- Pop-Tarts: the top selling brand of toaster pastry for many years, first introduced by Kellogg's in 1965.
- Toast'em Pop Ups: Toast'ems began production in February 1964 as Post Country Squares. The name changed in 1965 to Toast'em Pop Ups. The brand was sold to Schulze and Burch in 1971.
- Toaster Strudels: Pillsbury's Toaster Strudel is a toaster pastry meant to taste like a traditional German strudel with icing. The icing comes in a removable plastic package, and the pastries must be frozen, unlike other toaster pastries.
- Toastettes: Nabisco (which is now owned by Kraft Foods) created their toaster pastry in 1967 called "Toastettes", to compete with Kellogg's Pop-Tarts. The brand was discontinued in 2002 after a failed marketing effort to tie Toastettes in with Nabisco's children's brands. Nabisco also made toaster pastries with the name "Kool Stuf", which was also later discontinued.
- Toastables: The Quaker Oats Company, now a subsidiary of PepsiCo, produces "Toastables".
- Nature's Path: Developing many flavors, Nature's Path creates organic toaster pastries
