= Israel national bobsleigh team =

Israeli sports team

The Israeli Bobsled and Skeleton Team (Hebrew: נבחרת ישראל במזחלות קרח) is the official bobsleigh and skeleton team of Israel. The team is the competitive wing of Bobsled/Skeleton Israel (BSI, formerly Israeli Bobsleigh and Skeleton Federation (IBSF)), which Aaron Zeff, former National Football League player John Frank, and David Greaves founded in 2002.

The team is currently represented in bobsleigh by teams piloted by Dave Nicholls, Olympian AJ Edelman, and to-be-announced female teams and in skeleton by Georgina Cohen, Joel Seligstein, and Jared Firestone.

Bobsled and Skeleton are run under the same international federation, the IBSF (International Bobsled and Skeleton Federation, formerly known as FIBT). Therefore, BSI ministers both the bobsled and skeleton teams.

The team qualified for the 2018 Olympic Games, in the sport of skeleton and were represented by AJ Edelman.

== Bobsled team ==
The Israeli National Bobsleigh Team was incorporated in 2002 and have represented Israel in the FIBT World Bobsleigh Championships on three occasions.

Season	Bobsleigh Team Members	World Championships Location
2003/2004	Aaron Zeff; David Greaves; John Frank; Moshe Horowitz	Koenigssee, Germany
2004/2005	Aaron Zeff; David Greaves; John Frank; Moshe Horowitz	Calgary, Canada
2011/12	Omri Geva	DNQ
2018/2019	Dave Nicholls; AJ Edelman (regional competition only)	Whistler, BC
2019/20	Dave Nicholls	DNQ
2020/21	Dave Nicholls; AJ Edelman; TBA Female Team	

Bobsled alumni include Zeff, Frank. and Greaves as well as Moshe Horowitz.

== Skeleton team ==
BSI added Skeleton to its program in 2009.

In the 2015/16 season Israel fielded its largest team to date and held its first national championships. All four athletes (AJ Edelman, Joel Seligstein, Larry Sidney, and Brad Chalupski) competed through the remainder of the PyeongChang Olympic cycle.

Season	Athletes	IBSF World Championships/Olympics Representative	World Championships/Olympics Location
2010/2011	Brad Chalupski	Brad Chalupski	Koenigssee, Germany
2011/2012	Brad Chalupski	Brad Chalupski	Lake Placid, USA
2012/2013	Brad Chalupski	No Representative	St. Moritz, Switzerland
2013/2014	Brad Chalupski	Did not qualify	Sochi, Russia (Olympic Winter Games)
2014/2015	Adam (AJ) Edelman	No Representative	Winterberg, Germany
2015/2016	Adam (AJ) Edelman; Brad Chalupski; Joel Seligstein; Larry Sidney	Adam (AJ) Edelman	Igls, Austria
2016/2017	Adam (AJ) Edelman; Brad Chalupski; Joel Seligstein; Larry Sidney	Adam (AJ) Edelman	Koenigssee, Germany
2017/2018	Adam (AJ) Edelman; Brad Chalupski; Joel Seligstein; Larry Sidney	Adam (AJ) Edelman	Pyeongchang, Korea (Olympic Winter Games)
2018/2019	Joel Seligstein Georgie Cohen	Joel Seligstein Georgie Cohen	Whistler, BC

Israel has competed in the Skeleton World Championships in 2011, 2012, 2016, 2017 and 2019. Skeleton alumni include Omri Geva and Aliyah Snyder.

On December 2, 2011, Chalupski earned Israel's first ever medal in Skeleton, finishing in fifth place at the Americas Cup race in Lake Placid. Chalupski is also the first skeleton athlete to represent Israel in the World Cup.

In the 2017/2018 season Israel won 3 sliding medals. Joel Seligstein took a 5th place medal at the North Americas cup race in Calgary, Canada, and Adam (AJ) Edelman took home 2 fifth place medals at the two North Americas Cup races in Lake Placid to secure an Olympic berth.

== Olympic Games ==
Israel qualified for the 2018 Winter Olympics in Pyeongchang, Korea, and was represented by national champion Adam Edelman.

The team qualified again for the 2026 Winter Olympics, but it was disqualified after the Israeli Olympic Committee withdrew the team. One athlete had claimed to be ill, a claim supported by a medical check and signed affidavit, to allow a substitute to complete in his place. It was later revealed that the athlete had falsely claimed to be sick. As substitutions are only permitted for legitimate illness or injury under Olympic rules, the Israeli Olympic Committee barred the team from competing further.

== Organizational structure ==
The Federation President is David Greaves, and the Secretary General is Dov 'Dubi' Shlenger.

== See also ==
- Sports in Israel
