= National Gym Association =

US non-profit organization

The National Gym Association (NGA), founded in 1979, is a 501(3)(c) non-profit organization in the US dedicated to the betterment of all-natural bodybuilding and providing fitness training programs. In fulfilling its purpose, the NGA promotes and sanctions "all-natural" or "drug-free" professional, amateur and figure competitors with over 50 contests throughout the United States.

The NGA was founded by Andrew Bostinto a former Pro. Mr. America (Masters).

The NGA board of directors and faculty staff include medical directors, PhDs, Masters in Medical Biology and Nutrition, personal trainer, and current bodybuilding champions.
