= Ṅa =

Letter "Ṅa" in Indic scripts

Example glyphs
- Bengali–Assamese: Ṅa
- Tibetan: Ṅa
- Tamil: Ṅa
- Thai: ง
- Malayalam: ങ
- Sinhala: ඞ
- Ashoka Brahmi: Ṅa
- Devanagari: Ṅa

Cognates
- Hebrew: נ ,ן
- Greek: Ν
- Latin: N
- Cyrillic: Н

Properties
- Phonemic representation: /ŋ/
- IAST transliteration: nga Nga
- ISCII code point: B7 (183)

Ṅa is the fifth consonant of Indic abugidas. In modern Indic scripts, It is derived from the early "Ashoka" Brahmi letter after having gone through the Gupta letter.

== Āryabhaṭa numeration ==
Aryabhata used Devanagari letters for numbers, very similar to the Greek numerals, even after the invention of Indian numerals. The values of the different forms of ङ are:

- ङ [ŋə] = 5 (५)
- ङि [ŋi] = 500 (५००)
- ङु [ŋu] = 50,000 (५० ०००)
- ङृ [ŋr̩] = 5,000,000 (५० ०० ०००)
- ङॢ [ŋl̩] = 5×10^{8} (५०^{८})
- ङे [ŋeː] = 5×10^{10} (५०^{१०})
- ङै [ŋəi̯] = 5×10^{12} (५०^{१२})
- ङो [ŋoː] = 5×10^{14} (५०^{१४})
- ङौ [ŋəu̯] = 5×10^{16} (५०^{१६})

== Historic Nga ==
There are three different general early historic scripts - Brahmi and its variants, Kharoṣṭhī, and Tocharian, the so-called slanting Brahmi. Nga as found in standard Brahmi, was a simple geometric shape, with variations toward more flowing forms by the Gupta. The Tocharian Nga did not have an alternate Fremdzeichen form. Unlike the other early Brahmic scripts, Kharoṣṭhī did not have a letter Nga.

=== Brahmi Nga ===
The Brahmi letter, Nga, is probably derived from the altered Aramaic Nun, and is thus related to the modern Latin N and Greek Nu (letter). Several identifiable styles of writing the Brahmi Nga can be found, most associated with a specific set of inscriptions from an artifact or diverse records from an historic period. As the earliest and most geometric style of Brahmi, the letters found on the Edicts of Ashoka and other records from around that time are normally the reference form for Brahmi letters, with vowel marks not attested until later forms of Brahmi back-formed to match the geometric writing style.

Brahmi Nga historic forms
| Ashoka (3rd-1st c. BCE) | Girnar (~150 BCE) | Kushana (~150-250 CE) | Gujarat (~250 CE) | Gupta (~350 CE) |
|---|---|---|---|---|
| | No sample | | | |

=== Tocharian Nga ===
The Tocharian letter is derived from the Brahmi, but does not have an alternate Fremdzeichen form.

Tocharian Nga with vowel marks
| Nga | Ngā | Ngi | Ngī | Ngu | Ngū | Ngr | Ngr̄ | Nge | Ngai | Ngo | Ngau | Ngä |

== Devanagari script ==
Ṅa (ङ) is the fifth consonant of the Devanagari abugida. It ultimately arose from the Brahmi letter, after having gone through the Gupta letter. Letters that derive from it are the Gujarati letter ઙ and the Modi letter 𑘒.

=== Devanagari-using Languages ===
In all languages, ङ is pronounced as [ŋə] or [ŋ] when appropriate. Like all Indic scripts, Devanagari uses vowel marks attached to the base consonant to override the inherent /ə/ vowel:

Devanagari ङ with vowel marks
| Ṅa | Ṅā | Ṅi | Ṅī | Ṅu | Ṅū | Ṅr | Ṅr̄ | Ṅl | Ṅl̄ | Ṅe | Ṅai | Ṅo | Ṅau | Ṅ |
|---|---|---|---|---|---|---|---|---|---|---|---|---|---|---|
| ङ | ङा | ङि | ङी | ङु | ङू | ङृ | ङॄ | ङॢ | ङॣ | ङे | ङै | ङो | ङौ | ङ् |

=== Conjuncts with ङ ===
Devanagari exhibits conjunct ligatures, as is common in Indic scripts. In modern Devanagari texts, most conjuncts are formed by reducing the letter shape to fit tightly to the following letter, usually by dropping a character's vertical stem, sometimes referred to as a "half form". Some conjunct clusters are always represented by a true ligature, instead of a shape that can be broken into constituent independent letters. Vertically stacked conjuncts are ubiquitous in older texts, while only a few are still used routinely in modern Devanagari texts. Lacking a vertical stem to drop for making a half form, Ṅa either forms a stacked conjunct/ligature, or uses its full form with Virama. The use of ligatures and vertical conjuncts may vary across languages using the Devanagari script, with Marathi in particular avoiding their use where texts in other languages would use them.

==== Ligature conjuncts of ङ ====
True ligatures are quite rare in Indic scripts. The most common ligated conjuncts in Devanagari are in the form of a slight mutation to fit in context or as a consistent variant form appended to the adjacent characters. Those variants include Na and the Repha and Rakar forms of Ra. Nepali and Marathi texts use the "eyelash" Ra half form for an initial "R" instead of repha.

- Repha र্ (r) + ङ (ŋa) gives the ligature rŋa: ^{note}

- Eyelash र্ (r) + ङ (ŋa) gives the ligature rŋa:

- ङ্ (ŋ) + rakar र (ra) gives the ligature ŋra:

- ङ্ (ŋ) + य (ya) gives the ligature ŋya:

==== Stacked conjuncts of ङ ====
Vertically stacked ligatures are the most common conjunct forms found in Devanagari text. Although the constituent characters may need to be stretched and moved slightly in order to stack neatly, stacked conjuncts can be broken down into recognizable base letters, or a letter and an otherwise standard ligature.

- भ্ (bʰ) + ङ (ŋa) gives the ligature bʰŋa:

- ब্ (b) + ङ (ŋa) gives the ligature bŋa:

- छ্ (cʰ) + ङ (ŋa) gives the ligature cʰŋa:

- च্ (c) + ङ (ŋa) gives the ligature cŋa:

- ढ্ (ḍʱ) + ङ (ŋa) gives the ligature ḍʱŋa:

- ड্ (ḍ) + ङ (ŋa) gives the ligature ḍŋa:

- ध্ (dʱ) + ङ (ŋa) gives the ligature dʱŋa:

- द্ (d) + ङ (ŋa) gives the ligature dŋa:

- घ্ (ɡʱ) + ङ (ŋa) gives the ligature ɡʱŋa:

- झ্ (jʰ) + ङ (ŋa) gives the ligature jʰŋa:

- ज্ (j) + ङ (ŋa) gives the ligature jŋa:

- ख্ (kʰ) + ङ (ŋa) gives the ligature kʰŋa:

- क্ (k) + ङ (ŋa) gives the ligature kŋa:

- ळ্ (ḷ) + ङ (ŋa) gives the ligature ḷŋa:

- म্ (m) + ङ (ŋa) gives the ligature mŋa:

- ङ্ (ŋ) + ब (ba) gives the ligature ŋba:

- ङ্ (ŋ) + भ (bʰa) gives the ligature ŋbʰa:

- ङ্ (ŋ) + च (ca) gives the ligature ŋca:

- ङ্ (ŋ) + छ (cʰa) gives the ligature ŋcʰa:

- ङ্ (ŋ) + द (da) gives the ligature ŋda:

- ङ্ (ŋ) + ड (ḍa) gives the ligature ŋḍa:

- ङ্ (ŋ) + ढ (ḍʱa) gives the ligature ŋḍʱa:

- ङ্ (ŋ) + ध (dʱa) gives the ligature ŋdʱa:

- ङ্ (ŋ) + ग (ga) gives the ligature ŋga:

- ङ্ (ŋ) + घ (ɡʱa) gives the ligature ŋɡʱa:

- ङ্ (ŋ) + ह (ha) gives the ligature ŋha:

- ङ্ (ŋ) + ज (ja) gives the ligature ŋja:

- ङ্ (ŋ) + झ (jʰa) gives the ligature ŋjʰa:

- ङ্ (ŋ) + ज্ (j) + ञ (ña) gives the ligature ŋjña:

- ङ্ (ŋ) + क (ka) gives the ligature ŋka:

- ङ্ (ŋ) + ख (kʰa) gives the ligature ŋkʰa:

- ङ্ (ŋ) + क্ (k) + rakar र (ra) gives the ligature ŋkra:

- ङ্ (ŋ) + क্ (k) + ष (ṣa) gives the ligature ŋkṣa:

- ङ্ (ŋ) + क্ (k) + ष্ (ṣ) + य (ya) gives the ligature ŋkṣya:

- ङ্ (ŋ) + क্ (k) + त (ta) gives the ligature ŋkta:

- ङ্ (ŋ) + ल (la) gives the ligature ŋla:

- ङ্ (ŋ) + ळ (ḷa) gives the ligature ŋḷa:

- ङ্ (ŋ) + म (ma) gives the ligature ŋma:

- ङ্ (ŋ) + न (na) gives the ligature ŋna:

- ङ্ (ŋ) + ङ (ŋa) gives the ligature ŋŋa:

- ङ্ (ŋ) + ण (ṇa) gives the ligature ŋṇa:

- ङ্ (ŋ) + ञ (ña) gives the ligature ŋña:

- ङ্ (ŋ) + प (pa) gives the ligature ŋpa:

- ङ্ (ŋ) + फ (pʰa) gives the ligature ŋpʰa:

- ङ্ (ŋ) + स (sa) gives the ligature ŋsa:

- ङ্ (ŋ) + श (ʃa) gives the ligature ŋʃa:

- ङ্ (ŋ) + ष (ṣa) gives the ligature ŋṣa:

- ङ্ (ŋ) + त (ta) gives the ligature ŋta:

- ङ্ (ŋ) + थ (tʰa) gives the ligature ŋtʰa:

- ङ্ (ŋ) + ट (ṭa) gives the ligature ŋṭa:

- ङ্ (ŋ) + ठ (ṭʰa) gives the ligature ŋṭʰa:

- ङ্ (ŋ) + व (va) gives the ligature ŋva:

- फ্ (pʰ) + ङ (ŋa) gives the ligature pʰŋa:

- प্ (p) + ङ (ŋa) gives the ligature pŋa:

- Repha र্ (r) + ङ্ (ŋ) + ग (ga) gives the ligature rŋga:

- ष্ (ṣ) + ङ (ŋa) gives the ligature ṣŋa:

- थ্ (tʰ) + ङ (ŋa) gives the ligature tʰŋa:

- ठ্ (ṭʰ) + ङ (ŋa) gives the ligature ṭʰŋa:

- ट্ (ṭ) + ङ (ŋa) gives the ligature ṭŋa:

- व্ (v) + ङ (ŋa) gives the ligature vŋa:

- य্ (y) + ङ (ŋa) gives the ligature yŋa:

== Bengali script ==
The Bengali script ঙ is derived from the Siddhaṃ, and has no horizontal head line, and a less geometric shape than its Devanagari counterpart, ङ. The inherent vowel of Bengali consonant letters is /ɔ/, so the bare letter ঙ will sometimes be transliterated as "ngo" instead of "nga". Adding okar, the "o" vowel mark, gives a reading of /ŋo/. Like all Indic consonants, ঙ can be modified by marks to indicate another (or no) vowel than its inherent "a".

Bengali ঙ with vowel marks
| nga | ngā | ngi | ngī | ngu | ngū | ngr | ngr̄ | nge | ngai | ngo | ngau | ng |
|---|---|---|---|---|---|---|---|---|---|---|---|---|
| ঙ | ঙা | ঙি | ঙী | ঙু | ঙূ | ঙৃ | ঙৄ | ঙে | ঙৈ | ঙো | ঙৌ | ঙ্ |

=== ঙ in Bengali-using languages ===
ঙ is used as a basic consonant character in all of the major Bengali script orthographies, including Bengali and Assamese.

=== Conjuncts with ঙ ===
Bengali ঙ exhibits conjunct ligatures, as is common in Indic scripts, with both stacked and unstacked ligatures being common.

- ঙ্ (ŋ) + গ (ga) gives the ligature ŋga:

- ঙ্ (ŋ) + ঘ (ɡʱa) gives the ligature ŋɡʱa:

- ঙ্ (ŋ) + ঘ্ (ɡʱ) + র (ra) gives the ligature ŋɡʱra, with the ra phala suffix:

- ঙ্ (ŋ) + ঘ্ (ɡʱ) + য (ya) gives the ligature ŋɡʱya, with the ya phala suffix:

- ঙ্ (ŋ) + গ্ (g) + য (ya) gives the ligature ŋgya, with the ya phala suffix:

- ঙ্ (ŋ) + ক (ka) gives the ligature ŋka:

- ঙ্ (ŋ) + খ (kʰa) gives the ligature ŋkʰa:

- ঙ্ (ŋ) + ক্ (k) + র (ra) gives the ligature ŋkra, with the ra phala suffix:

- ঙ্ (ŋ) + ক্ (k) + শ (ʃa) gives the ligature ŋkʃa:

- ঙ্ (ŋ) + ক্ (k) + য (ya) gives the ligature ŋkya, with the ya phala suffix:

- ঙ্ (ŋ) + ম (ma) gives the ligature ŋma:

== Gujarati Ṅa ==
Gujarati Ṅa.

Ṅa (ઙ) is the fifth consonant of the Gujarati abugida. It is derived from the 16th century Devanagari Ṅa with the top bar (shirorekha) removed, and ultimately from the Brahmi letter.

=== Gujarati-using Languages ===
The Gujarati script is used to write the Gujarati and Kutchi languages. In both languages, ઙ is pronounced as [ŋə] or [ŋ] when appropriate. Like all Indic scripts, Gujarati uses vowel marks attached to the base consonant to override the inherent /ə/ vowel:

| Ṅa | Ṅā | Ṅi | Ṅī | Ṅu | Ṅū | Ṅr | Ṅl | Ṅr̄ | Ṅl̄ | Ṅĕ | Ṅe | Ṅai | Ṅŏ | Ṅo | Ṅau | Ṅ |
|---|---|---|---|---|---|---|---|---|---|---|---|---|---|---|---|---|
Gujarati Ṅa syllables, with vowel marks in red.

=== Conjuncts with ઙ ===
Gujarati ઙ exhibits conjunct ligatures, much like its parent Devanagari Script. While most Gujarati conjuncts can only be formed by reducing the letter shape to create a "half form" that fits tightly to following letter, Ṅa does not have a half form. A few conjunct clusters can be represented by a true ligature, instead of a shape that can be broken into constituent independent letters, and vertically stacked conjuncts can also be found in Gujarati, although much less commonly than in Devanagari. Lacking a half form, Ṅa will normally use an explicit virama when forming conjuncts without a true ligature. True ligatures are quite rare in Indic scripts. The most common ligated conjuncts in Gujarati are in the form of a slight mutation to fit in context or as a consistent variant form appended to the adjacent characters. Those variants include Na and the Repha and Rakar forms of Ra.

- ર્ (r) + ઙ (ŋa) gives the ligature RṄa:

- ઙ્ (ŋ) + ર (ra) gives the ligature ṄRa:

- ઙ્ (ŋ) + ક (ka) gives the ligature ṄKa:

- ઙ્ (ŋ) + ક (ka) ષ (ʂa) gives the ligature ṄKṢa:

== Gurmukhi script ==
Ṅaṅā [ŋɑŋːɑ̃] (ਙ) is the tenth letter of the Gurmukhi alphabet. Its name is [ŋɑŋːɑ̃] and is pronounced as /ŋ/ when used in words. It is derived from the Laṇḍā letter ṅa, and ultimately from the Brahmi ṅa. Gurmukhi ṅaṅā does not have a special pairin or addha (reduced) form for making conjuncts, and in modern Punjabi texts do not take a half form or halant to indicate the bare consonant /ŋ/, although Gurmukhi Sanskrit texts may use an explicit halant. Ṅaṅā is rarely used. It cannot begin a syllable or be placed between two consonants, and occurs most often as an allophone of /n/ before specific consonant phonemes.

== Burmese script ==
Nga(င) is the fifth letter of the Burmese script.

== Thai script ==
Ngo ngu (ง) is the seventh letter of the Thai script. It falls under the low class of Thai consonants. In IPA, ngo ngu is pronounced as [ŋ] at the beginning of a syllable and at the end of a syllable. Unlike many Indic scripts, Thai consonants do not form conjunct ligatures, and use the pinthu—an explicit virama with a dot shape—to indicate bare consonants. In the acrophony of the Thai script, ngu (งู) means ‘snake’. Ngo ngu corresponds to the Sanskrit character ‘ङ’.

== Telugu Ṅa ==
Telugu independent and subjoined Ṅa.

Ṅa (ఙ) is a consonant of the Telugu abugida. It ultimately arose from the Brahmi letter. It is closely related to the Kannada letter ಙ. Since it lacks the v-shaped headstroke common to most Telugu letters, ఙ remains unaltered by most vowel matras, and its subjoined form is simply a smaller version of the normal letter shape. Telugu conjuncts are created by reducing trailing letters to a subjoined form that appears below the initial consonant of the conjunct. Many subjoined forms are created by dropping their headline, with many extending the end of the stroke of the main letter body to form an extended tail reaching up to the right of the preceding consonant. This subjoining of trailing letters to create conjuncts is in contrast to the leading half forms of Devanagari and Bengali letters. Ligature conjuncts are not a feature in Telugu, with the only non-standard construction being an alternate subjoined form of Ṣa (borrowed from Kannada) in the KṢa conjunct.

== Malayalam Ṅa ==
Malayalam letter Ṅa

Ṅa (ങ) is a consonant of the Malayalam abugida. It ultimately arose from the Brahmi letter, via the Grantha letter Nga. Like in other Indic scripts, Malayalam consonants have the inherent vowel "a", and take one of several modifying vowel signs to represent syllables with another vowel or no vowel at all.

Malayalam Nga matras: Nga, Ngā, Ngi, Ngī, Ngu, Ngū, Ngr̥, Ngr̥̄, Ngl̥, Ngl̥̄, Nge, Ngē, Ngai, Ngo, Ngō, Ngau, and Ng.

=== Conjuncts of ങ ===
As is common in Indic scripts, Malayalam joins letters together to form conjunct consonant clusters. There are several ways in which conjuncts are formed in Malayalam texts: using a post-base form of a trailing consonant placed under the initial consonant of a conjunct, a combined ligature of two or more consonants joined together, a conjoining form that appears as a combining mark on the rest of the conjunct, the use of an explicit candrakkala mark to suppress the inherent "a" vowel, or a special consonant form called a "chillu" letter, representing a bare consonant without the inherent "a" vowel. Texts written with the modern reformed Malayalam orthography, put̪iya lipi, may favor more regular conjunct forms than older texts in paḻaya lipi, due to changes undertaken in the 1970s by the Government of Kerala.

- ങ് (ŋ) + ക (ka) gives the ligature ŋka:

- ങ് (ŋ) + ങ (ŋa) gives the ligature ŋŋa:

== Odia Ṅa ==
Odia independent and subjoined letter Ṅa.

Ṅa (ଙ) is a consonant of the Odia abugida. It ultimately arose from the Brahmi letter, via the Siddhaṃ letter Nga. Like in other Indic scripts, Odia consonants have the inherent vowel "a", and take one of several modifying vowel signs to represent syllables with another vowel or no vowel at all.

Odia Nga with vowel matras
| Ṅa | Ṅā | Ṅi | Ṅī | Ṅu | Ṅū | Ṅr̥ | Ṅr̥̄ | Ṅl̥ | Ṅl̥̄ | Ṅe | Ṅai | Ṅo | Ṅau | Ṅ |
|---|---|---|---|---|---|---|---|---|---|---|---|---|---|---|
| ଙ | ଙା | ଙି | ଙୀ | ଙୁ | ଙୂ | ଙୃ | ଙୄ | ଙୢ | ଙୣ | ଙେ | ଙୈ | ଙୋ | ଙୌ | ଙ୍ |

=== Conjuncts of ଙ ===
As is common in Indic scripts, Odia joins letters together to form conjunct consonant clusters. The most common conjunct formation is achieved by using a small subjoined form of trailing consonants. Most consonants' subjoined forms are identical to the full form, just reduced in size, although a few drop the curved headline or have a subjoined form not directly related to the full form of the consonant. The second type of conjunct formation is through pure ligatures, where the constituent consonants are written together in a single graphic form. This ligature may be recognizable as being a combination of two characters or it can have a conjunct ligature unrelated to its constituent characters.

- ଙ୍ (ŋ) + କ (ka) gives the ligature ŋka:

- ଙ୍ (ŋ) + ଖ (kʰa) gives the ligature ŋkʰa:

- ଙ୍ (ŋ) + ଗ (ga) gives the ligature ŋga:

- ଙ୍ (ŋ) + ଘ (ɡʱa) gives the ligature ŋɡʱa:

- ର୍ (r) + ଙ (ŋa) gives the ligature rŋa:

- ଙ୍ (ŋ) + ର (ra) gives the ligature ŋra:

== Kaithi Ṅa ==
Kaithi consonant Ṅa.

Ṅa (𑂑) is a consonant of the Kaithi abugida. It ultimately arose from the Brahmi letter, via the Siddhaṃ letter Nga. Like in other Indic scripts, Kaithi consonants have the inherent vowel "a", and take one of several modifying vowel signs to represent syllables with another vowel or no vowel at all.

Kaithi Nga with vowel matras
| Nga | Ngā | Ngi | Ngī | Ngu | Ngū | Nge | Ngai | Ngo | Ngau | Ng |
|---|---|---|---|---|---|---|---|---|---|---|
| 𑂑 | 𑂑𑂰 | 𑂑𑂱 | 𑂑𑂲 | 𑂑𑂳 | 𑂑𑂴 | 𑂑𑂵 | 𑂑𑂶 | 𑂑𑂷 | 𑂑𑂸 | 𑂑𑂹 |

=== Conjuncts of 𑂑 ===
As is common in Indic scripts, Kaithi joins letters together to form conjunct consonant clusters. The most common conjunct formation is achieved by using a half form of preceding consonants, although several consonants use an explicit virama. Most half forms are derived from the full form by removing the vertical stem. As is common in most Indic scripts, conjuncts of ra are indicated with a repha or rakar mark attached to the rest of the consonant cluster. In addition, there are a few vertical conjuncts that can be found in Kaithi writing, but true ligatures are not used in the modern Kaithi script.

- 𑂩୍ (r) + 𑂑 (ŋa) gives the ligature rŋa:

== Tirhuta Ṅa ==
Tirhuta consonant Ṅa

Ṅa (𑒓) is a consonant of the Tirhuta abugida. It ultimately arose from the Brahmi letter, via the Siddhaṃ letter Nga. Like in other Indic scripts, Tirhuta consonants have the inherent vowel "a", and take one of several modifying vowel signs to represent sylables with another vowel or no vowel at all.

Tirhuta Ṅa with vowel matras
| Ṅa | Ṅā | Ṅi | Ṅī | Ṅu | Ṅū | Ṅṛ | Ṅṝ | Ṅḷ | Ṅḹ | Ṅē | Ṅe | Ṅai | Ṅō | Ṅo | Ṅau | Ṅ |
|---|---|---|---|---|---|---|---|---|---|---|---|---|---|---|---|---|
| 𑒓 | 𑒓𑒰 | 𑒓𑒱 | 𑒓𑒲 | 𑒓𑒳 | 𑒓𑒴 | 𑒓𑒵 | 𑒓𑒶 | 𑒓𑒷 | 𑒓𑒸 | 𑒓𑒹 | 𑒓𑒺 | 𑒓𑒻 | 𑒓𑒼 | 𑒓𑒽 | 𑒓𑒾 | 𑒓𑓂 |

=== Conjuncts of 𑒓 ===
As is common in Indic scripts, Tirhuta joins letters together to form conjunct consonant clusters. The most common conjunct formation is achieved by using an explicit virama. As is common in most Indic scripts, conjuncts of ra are indicated with a repha or rakar mark attached to the rest of the consonant cluster. In addition, other consonants take unique combining forms when in conjunct with other letters, and there are several vertical conjuncts and true ligatures that can be found in Tirhuta writing.

- 𑒓୍ (ŋ) + 𑒑 (ga) gives the ligature ŋga:

- 𑒓୍ (ŋ) + 𑒒 (ɡʱa) gives the ligature ŋɡʱa:

- 𑒓୍ (ŋ) + 𑒏 (ka) gives the ligature ŋka:

- 𑒓୍ (ŋ) + 𑒐 (kʰa) gives the ligature ŋkʰa:

- 𑒓୍ (ŋ) + 𑒩 (ra) gives the ligature ŋra:

- 𑒓୍ (ŋ) + 𑒫 (va) gives the ligature ŋva:

- 𑒩୍ (r) + 𑒓 (ŋa) gives the ligature rŋa:

- 𑒞୍ (t) + 𑒓 (ŋa) gives the ligature tŋa:

== Comparison of Ṅa ==
The various Indic scripts are generally related to each other through adaptation and borrowing, and as such the glyphs for cognate letters, including Ṅa, are related as well.

Comparison of Ṅa in different scripts

Aramaic
Kharoṣṭhī - | Ashoka Brahmi | Kushana Brahmi (Note: The middle "Kushana" form of Brahmi is a later style that emerged as Brahmi scripts were beginning to proliferate. Gupta Brahmi was definitely a stylistic descendant from Kushana, but other Brahmi-derived scripts may have descended from earlier forms.) | Tocharian (Note: Tocharian is probably derived from the middle period "Kushana" form of Brahmi, although artifacts from that time are not plentiful enough to establish a definite succession.)
Gupta Brahmi | Pallava
Kadamba -
Bhaiksuki 𑰒 | Siddhaṃ | Grantha 𑌙 | Cham ꨋ
Sinhala ඞ | Pyu / Old Mon (Note: Pyu and Old Mon are probably the precursors of the Burmese script, and may be derived from either the Pallava or Kadamba script) -
Tibetan | Newa 𑐒 | Ahom 𑜂 | Malayalam ങ
Telugu ఙ | Burmese င
Lepcha ᰅ | Ranjana | Saurashtra ꢖ | Dives Akuru 𑤐
Kannada ಙ | Kayah Li ꤍ
Limbu ᤅ | Soyombo (Note: May also be derived from Devangari (see bottom left of table)) 𑩠 | Khmer ង | Tamil
Chakma 𑄋 | Tai Tham ᨦ
Meitei Mayek ꯡ | Gaudi - | Thai ง | Lao ງ
Tai Le ᥒ
Marchen 𑱵 | Tirhuta 𑒓 | New Tai Lue ᦇ / ᦄ | Tai Viet ꪉ / ꪈ | Aksara Kawi
'Phags-pa ꡃ | Odia ଙ | Sharada 𑆕 | Rejang ꤲ | Batak ᯝ | Buginese ᨂ
Zanabazar Square 𑨏 | Bengali–Assamese | Takri 𑚎 | Javanese ꦔ | Balinese ᬗ | Makasar 𑻢
Hangul (Note: The Origin of Hangul from 'Phags-pa is one of limited influence, inspiring at most a few basic letter shapes. Hangul does not function as an Indic abugida.) - | Northern Nagari - | Dogri 𑠎 | Laṇḍā - | Sundanese ᮍ | Baybayin ᜅ
Modi 𑘒 | Gujarati ઙ | Khojki 𑈍 | Khudabadi 𑊿 | Mahajani - | Tagbanwa ᝥ
Devanagari | Nandinagari 𑦲 | Kaithi | Gurmukhi ਙ | Multani - | Buhid ᝅ
Canadian Syllabics (Note: Although the basic letter forms of the Canadian Aboriginal Syllabics were derived from handwritten Devanagari letters, this abugida indicates vowel sounds by rotations of the letter form, rather than the use of vowel diacritics as is standard in Indic abugidas.) - | Soyombo (Note: May also be derived from Ranjana (see above)) 𑩠 | Sylheti Nagari - | Gunjala Gondi 𑶄 | Masaram Gondi (Note: Masaram Gondi acts as an Indic abugida, but its letterforms were not derived from any single precursor script.) 𑴐 | Hanuno'o ᜥ

== Character encodings of Ṅa ==
Most Indic scripts are encoded in the Unicode Standard, and as such the letter Ṅa in those scripts can be represented in plain text with unique codepoint. Ṅa from several modern-use scripts can also be found in legacy encodings, such as ISCII.

Character information
| Preview | | | | | | | ඞ | | ଙ | | ఙ | | ങ | | ઙ | | ਙ | |
|---|---|---|---|---|---|---|---|---|---|---|---|---|---|---|---|---|---|---|
| Unicode name | DEVANAGARI LETTER NGA | | BENGALI LETTER NGA | | TAMIL LETTER NGA | | SINHALA LETTER KANTAJA NAASIKYAYA | | ORIYA LETTER NGA | | TELUGU LETTER NGA | | MALAYALAM LETTER NGA | | GUJARATI LETTER NGA | | GURMUKHI LETTER NGA | |
| Encodings | decimal | hex | dec | hex | dec | hex | dec | hex | dec | hex | dec | hex | dec | hex | dec | hex | dec | hex |
| Unicode | 2329 | U+0919 | 2457 | U+0999 | 2969 | U+0B99 | 3486 | U+0D9E | 2841 | U+0B19 | 3097 | U+0C19 | 3353 | U+0D19 | 2713 | U+0A99 | 2585 | U+0A19 |
| UTF-8 | 224 164 153 | E0 A4 99 | 224 166 153 | E0 A6 99 | 224 174 153 | E0 AE 99 | 224 182 158 | E0 B6 9E | 224 172 153 | E0 AC 99 | 224 176 153 | E0 B0 99 | 224 180 153 | E0 B4 99 | 224 170 153 | E0 AA 99 | 224 168 153 | E0 A8 99 |
| Numeric character reference | &#2329; | &#x919; | &#2457; | &#x999; | &#2969; | &#xB99; | &#3486; | &#xD9E; | &#2841; | &#xB19; | &#3097; | &#xC19; | &#3353; | &#xD19; | &#2713; | &#xA99; | &#2585; | &#xA19; |
| ISCII | 183 | B7 | 183 | B7 | 183 | B7 | 183 | B7 | 183 | B7 | 183 | B7 | 183 | B7 | 183 | B7 | 183 | B7 |

Character information
| Preview | Ashoka Kushana Gupta | | | | 𑌙 | |
|---|---|---|---|---|---|---|
| Unicode name | BRAHMI LETTER NGA | | SIDDHAM LETTER NGA | | GRANTHA LETTER NGA | |
| Encodings | decimal | hex | dec | hex | dec | hex |
| Unicode | 69655 | U+11017 | 71058 | U+11592 | 70425 | U+11319 |
| UTF-8 | 240 145 128 151 | F0 91 80 97 | 240 145 150 146 | F0 91 96 92 | 240 145 140 153 | F0 91 8C 99 |
| UTF-16 | 55300 56343 | D804 DC17 | 55301 56722 | D805 DD92 | 55300 57113 | D804 DF19 |
| Numeric character reference | &#69655; | &#x11017; | &#71058; | &#x11592; | &#70425; | &#x11319; |

Character information
| Preview | | | ྔ | | ꡃ | | 𑨏 | | 𑐒 | | 𑰒 | | 𑆕 | |
|---|---|---|---|---|---|---|---|---|---|---|---|---|---|---|
| Unicode name | TIBETAN LETTER NGA | | TIBETAN SUBJOINED LETTER NGA | | PHAGS-PA LETTER NGA | | ZANABAZAR SQUARE LETTER NGA | | NEWA LETTER NGA | | BHAIKSUKI LETTER NGA | | SHARADA LETTER NGA | |
| Encodings | decimal | hex | dec | hex | dec | hex | dec | hex | dec | hex | dec | hex | dec | hex |
| Unicode | 3908 | U+0F44 | 3988 | U+0F94 | 43075 | U+A843 | 72207 | U+11A0F | 70674 | U+11412 | 72722 | U+11C12 | 70037 | U+11195 |
| UTF-8 | 224 189 132 | E0 BD 84 | 224 190 148 | E0 BE 94 | 234 161 131 | EA A1 83 | 240 145 168 143 | F0 91 A8 8F | 240 145 144 146 | F0 91 90 92 | 240 145 176 146 | F0 91 B0 92 | 240 145 134 149 | F0 91 86 95 |
| UTF-16 | 3908 | 0F44 | 3988 | 0F94 | 43075 | A843 | 55302 56847 | D806 DE0F | 55301 56338 | D805 DC12 | 55303 56338 | D807 DC12 | 55300 56725 | D804 DD95 |
| Numeric character reference | &#3908; | &#xF44; | &#3988; | &#xF94; | &#43075; | &#xA843; | &#72207; | &#x11A0F; | &#70674; | &#x11412; | &#72722; | &#x11C12; | &#70037; | &#x11195; |

Character information
| Preview | ᦇ | | ᦄ | | ᧂ | |
|---|---|---|---|---|---|---|
| Unicode name | NEW TAI LUE LETTER LOW NGA | | NEW TAI LUE LETTER HIGH NGA | | NEW TAI LUE LETTER FINAL NG | |
| Encodings | decimal | hex | dec | hex | dec | hex |
| Unicode | 6535 | U+1987 | 6532 | U+1984 | 6594 | U+19C2 |
| UTF-8 | 225 166 135 | E1 A6 87 | 225 166 132 | E1 A6 84 | 225 167 130 | E1 A7 82 |
| Numeric character reference | &#6535; | &#x1987; | &#6532; | &#x1984; | &#6594; | &#x19C2; |

- See further below for Burmese and Tai Tham codepoints.

Character information
| Preview | ង | | ງ | | ง | | ꪉ | | ꪈ | |
|---|---|---|---|---|---|---|---|---|---|---|
| Unicode name | KHMER LETTER NGO | | LAO LETTER NGO | | THAI CHARACTER NGO NGU | | TAI VIET LETTER HIGH NGO | | TAI VIET LETTER LOW NGO | |
| Encodings | decimal | hex | dec | hex | dec | hex | dec | hex | dec | hex |
| Unicode | 6020 | U+1784 | 3719 | U+0E87 | 3591 | U+0E07 | 43657 | U+AA89 | 43656 | U+AA88 |
| UTF-8 | 225 158 132 | E1 9E 84 | 224 186 135 | E0 BA 87 | 224 184 135 | E0 B8 87 | 234 170 137 | EA AA 89 | 234 170 136 | EA AA 88 |
| Numeric character reference | &#6020; | &#x1784; | &#3719; | &#xE87; | &#3591; | &#xE07; | &#43657; | &#xAA89; | &#43656; | &#xAA88; |

Character information
| Preview | ಙ | | ꤍ | | 𑄋 | | ᥒ | | 𑜂 | | 𑤐 | | ꢖ | | ꨋ | |
|---|---|---|---|---|---|---|---|---|---|---|---|---|---|---|---|---|
| Unicode name | KANNADA LETTER NGA | | KAYAH LI LETTER NGA | | CHAKMA LETTER NGAA | | TAI LE LETTER NGA | | AHOM LETTER NGA | | DIVES AKURU LETTER NGA | | SAURASHTRA LETTER NGA | | CHAM LETTER NGA | |
| Encodings | decimal | hex | dec | hex | dec | hex | dec | hex | dec | hex | dec | hex | dec | hex | dec | hex |
| Unicode | 3225 | U+0C99 | 43277 | U+A90D | 69899 | U+1110B | 6482 | U+1952 | 71426 | U+11702 | 71952 | U+11910 | 43158 | U+A896 | 43531 | U+AA0B |
| UTF-8 | 224 178 153 | E0 B2 99 | 234 164 141 | EA A4 8D | 240 145 132 139 | F0 91 84 8B | 225 165 146 | E1 A5 92 | 240 145 156 130 | F0 91 9C 82 | 240 145 164 144 | F0 91 A4 90 | 234 162 150 | EA A2 96 | 234 168 139 | EA A8 8B |
| UTF-16 | 3225 | 0C99 | 43277 | A90D | 55300 56587 | D804 DD0B | 6482 | 1952 | 55301 57090 | D805 DF02 | 55302 56592 | D806 DD10 | 43158 | A896 | 43531 | AA0B |
| Numeric character reference | &#3225; | &#xC99; | &#43277; | &#xA90D; | &#69899; | &#x1110B; | &#6482; | &#x1952; | &#71426; | &#x11702; | &#71952; | &#x11910; | &#43158; | &#xA896; | &#43531; | &#xAA0B; |

Character information
| Preview | 𑘒 | | 𑦲 | | 𑩠 | | 𑶄 | | | |
|---|---|---|---|---|---|---|---|---|---|---|
| Unicode name | MODI LETTER NGA | | NANDINAGARI LETTER NGA | | SOYOMBO LETTER NGA | | GUNJALA GONDI LETTER NGA | | KAITHI LETTER NGA | |
| Encodings | decimal | hex | dec | hex | dec | hex | dec | hex | dec | hex |
| Unicode | 71186 | U+11612 | 72114 | U+119B2 | 72288 | U+11A60 | 73092 | U+11D84 | 69777 | U+11091 |
| UTF-8 | 240 145 152 146 | F0 91 98 92 | 240 145 166 178 | F0 91 A6 B2 | 240 145 169 160 | F0 91 A9 A0 | 240 145 182 132 | F0 91 B6 84 | 240 145 130 145 | F0 91 82 91 |
| UTF-16 | 55301 56850 | D805 DE12 | 55302 56754 | D806 DDB2 | 55302 56928 | D806 DE60 | 55303 56708 | D807 DD84 | 55300 56465 | D804 DC91 |
| Numeric character reference | &#71186; | &#x11612; | &#72114; | &#x119B2; | &#72288; | &#x11A60; | &#73092; | &#x11D84; | &#69777; | &#x11091; |

Character information
| Preview | 𑒓 | | ᰅ | | ᤅ | | ꯡ | | 𑱵 | |
|---|---|---|---|---|---|---|---|---|---|---|
| Unicode name | TIRHUTA LETTER NGA | | LEPCHA LETTER NGA | | LIMBU LETTER NGA | | MEETEI MAYEK LETTER NGOU LONSUM | | MARCHEN LETTER NGA | |
| Encodings | decimal | hex | dec | hex | dec | hex | dec | hex | dec | hex |
| Unicode | 70803 | U+11493 | 7173 | U+1C05 | 6405 | U+1905 | 44001 | U+ABE1 | 72821 | U+11C75 |
| UTF-8 | 240 145 146 147 | F0 91 92 93 | 225 176 133 | E1 B0 85 | 225 164 133 | E1 A4 85 | 234 175 161 | EA AF A1 | 240 145 177 181 | F0 91 B1 B5 |
| UTF-16 | 55301 56467 | D805 DC93 | 7173 | 1C05 | 6405 | 1905 | 44001 | ABE1 | 55303 56437 | D807 DC75 |
| Numeric character reference | &#70803; | &#x11493; | &#7173; | &#x1C05; | &#6405; | &#x1905; | &#44001; | &#xABE1; | &#72821; | &#x11C75; |

Character information
| Preview | 𑚎 | | 𑠎 | | 𑈍 | | 𑊿 | |
|---|---|---|---|---|---|---|---|---|
| Unicode name | TAKRI LETTER NGA | | DOGRA LETTER NGA | | KHOJKI LETTER NGA | | KHUDAWADI LETTER NGA | |
| Encodings | decimal | hex | dec | hex | dec | hex | dec | hex |
| Unicode | 71310 | U+1168E | 71694 | U+1180E | 70157 | U+1120D | 70335 | U+112BF |
| UTF-8 | 240 145 154 142 | F0 91 9A 8E | 240 145 160 142 | F0 91 A0 8E | 240 145 136 141 | F0 91 88 8D | 240 145 138 191 | F0 91 8A BF |
| UTF-16 | 55301 56974 | D805 DE8E | 55302 56334 | D806 DC0E | 55300 56845 | D804 DE0D | 55300 57023 | D804 DEBF |
| Numeric character reference | &#71310; | &#x1168E; | &#71694; | &#x1180E; | &#70157; | &#x1120D; | &#70335; | &#x112BF; |

Character information
| Preview | ᬗ | | ᯝ | | ᨂ | | ꦔ | | 𑻢 | | ꤲ | | ᮍ | |
|---|---|---|---|---|---|---|---|---|---|---|---|---|---|---|
| Unicode name | BALINESE LETTER NGA | | BATAK LETTER NGA | | BUGINESE LETTER NGA | | JAVANESE LETTER NGA | | MAKASAR LETTER NGA | | REJANG LETTER NGA | | SUNDANESE LETTER NGA | |
| Encodings | decimal | hex | dec | hex | dec | hex | dec | hex | dec | hex | dec | hex | dec | hex |
| Unicode | 6935 | U+1B17 | 7133 | U+1BDD | 6658 | U+1A02 | 43412 | U+A994 | 73442 | U+11EE2 | 43314 | U+A932 | 7053 | U+1B8D |
| UTF-8 | 225 172 151 | E1 AC 97 | 225 175 157 | E1 AF 9D | 225 168 130 | E1 A8 82 | 234 166 148 | EA A6 94 | 240 145 187 162 | F0 91 BB A2 | 234 164 178 | EA A4 B2 | 225 174 141 | E1 AE 8D |
| UTF-16 | 6935 | 1B17 | 7133 | 1BDD | 6658 | 1A02 | 43412 | A994 | 55303 57058 | D807 DEE2 | 43314 | A932 | 7053 | 1B8D |
| Numeric character reference | &#6935; | &#x1B17; | &#7133; | &#x1BDD; | &#6658; | &#x1A02; | &#43412; | &#xA994; | &#73442; | &#x11EE2; | &#43314; | &#xA932; | &#7053; | &#x1B8D; |

Character information
| Preview | ᜅ | | ᝥ | | ᝅ | | ᜥ | | 𑴐 | |
|---|---|---|---|---|---|---|---|---|---|---|
| Unicode name | TAGALOG LETTER NGA | | TAGBANWA LETTER NGA | | BUHID LETTER NGA | | HANUNOO LETTER NGA | | MASARAM GONDI LETTER NGA | |
| Encodings | decimal | hex | dec | hex | dec | hex | dec | hex | dec | hex |
| Unicode | 5893 | U+1705 | 5989 | U+1765 | 5957 | U+1745 | 5925 | U+1725 | 72976 | U+11D10 |
| UTF-8 | 225 156 133 | E1 9C 85 | 225 157 165 | E1 9D A5 | 225 157 133 | E1 9D 85 | 225 156 165 | E1 9C A5 | 240 145 180 144 | F0 91 B4 90 |
| UTF-16 | 5893 | 1705 | 5989 | 1765 | 5957 | 1745 | 5925 | 1725 | 55303 56592 | D807 DD10 |
| Numeric character reference | &#5893; | &#x1705; | &#5989; | &#x1765; | &#5957; | &#x1745; | &#5925; | &#x1725; | &#72976; | &#x11D10; |

Character information
| Preview | င | | င်္ | | ᨦ | | ᩙ | | ᩘ | |
|---|---|---|---|---|---|---|---|---|---|---|
| Unicode name | MYANMAR LETTER NGA | | Myanmar superscript NGA | | TAI THAM LETTER NGA | | TAI THAM CONSONANT SIGN FINAL NGA | | TAI THAM SIGN MAI KANG LAI | |
| Encodings | decimal | hex | dec | hex | dec | hex | dec | hex | dec | hex |
| Unicode | 4100 | U+1004 | 4100 4154 4153 | U+1004+103A+1039 | 6694 | U+1A26 | 6745 | U+1A59 | 6744 | U+1A58 |
| UTF-8 | 225 128 132 | E1 80 84 | 225 128 132 225 128 186 225 128 185 | E1 80 84 E1 80 BA E1 80 B9 | 225 168 166 | E1 A8 A6 | 225 169 153 | E1 A9 99 | 225 169 152 | E1 A9 98 |
| Numeric character reference | &#4100; | &#x1004; | &#4100;&#4154;&#4153; | &#x1004;&#x103A;&#x1039; | &#6694; | &#x1A26; | &#6745; | &#x1A59; | &#6744; | &#x1A58; |
