= Bullough =

The name Bullough may refer to:

- Edward Bullough (1880–1934), English aesthetician and scholar of modern languages
- Edward Bullough (1866–1934), English rugby union footballer
- Hank Bullough (1934–2019), American football coach
- James Bullough (1800–1868), English inventor of the 1842 Lancashire Loom
- Denis Bullough (born 1895), British football player
- James Bullough Lansing (1902–1949), American engineer
- Robin Bullough (1929–2008), British mathematical physicist
- Sir George Bullough, 1st Baronet (1870–1939), English businessman, soldier, and Thoroughbred racehorse owner and breeder
- Vern Bullough (1928–2006), American historian and sexologist
- Donald A. Bullough (1928–2002) British medieval historian
- Riley Bullough (born 1993), American football player, Michigan State University

== See also ==
- Bullough-Dodd
- Bullough's Pond
- Reflections in Bullough's Pond
