= Simeon North Factory Site =

Archaeological site in Connecticut, United States

- U.S. National Register of Historic Places
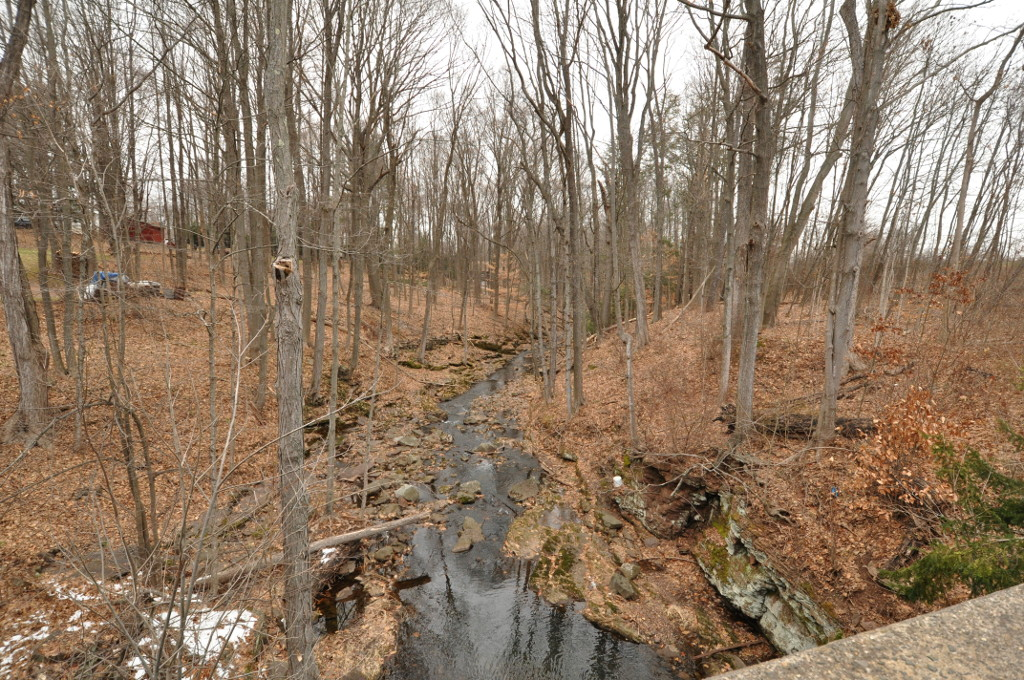
- The probable factory site
- Location: Berlin, Connecticut
- Area: 1 acre (0.40 ha)
- Built: 1795
- NRHP reference No.: 90001158
- Added to NRHP: August 18, 1990

The Simeon North Factory Site is a historic archaeological site in Berlin, Connecticut. It encompasses the remnants of an early gun factory of the pioneering manufacturer Simeon North. It was listed on the National Register of Historic Places in 1990.

== Description ==
Simeon North (1765-1852) was a native of Berlin, and in June 1795 purchased an interest in a local sawmill. He adapted the site to the manufacture of scythes, and also used it as a manufacturing site for a contract awarded to him by the United States government for the purchase of firearms with interchangeable parts. It was the first contract of this type issued by the government, and North's innovations in the production of firearms are considered significant. In 1805 purchased the remaining shares of the mill, and erected a two-story factory on the site. North is believed to have primarily manufactured pistols at this site, although parts for muskets and rifles may also have been produced here for assembly elsewhere. Work ceased at this site in 1842-3, and the building was reported to be in deteriorated condition 15 years later. A flood eventually washed away the remains of the above-ground structure.

The site is located on private property adjacent to a stream, including a dam that now supports a roadway. A portion of the main mill foundation stands on the stream's western bank below the dam, with a rubble pile of stone remains up to six feet high; these features are visible from the road. Archaeological investigation of the site in the 1980s uncovered more than 900 artifacts, including many metal items. Among these were pistol parts such as springs, pistol cocks, and triggers.

== See also ==
- National Register of Historic Places listings in Hartford County, Connecticut
