= Simeon North =

- Born: July 13, 1765
- Died: August 25, 1852 (aged 87)
- Children: Simeon North, Jr. (President of Hamilton College)

Simeon North (July 13, 1765 – August 25, 1852) was an American gun manufacturer, who developed one of America's first milling machines (possibly the very first) in 1818 and played an important role in the development of interchangeable parts manufacturing.

North was born in Berlin, Connecticut, into a prosperous family able to provide all six sons with farms of their own. North was given a farm in Berlin, a gift that enabled him to marry Lucy Savage when he was only twenty-one years old; the couple had five sons and three daughters. In 1795 the Norths purchased a sawmill located on the brook that ran beside their land. Simeon hired a man to help run it, enlarged the building to house a forge and trip-hammer, and began manufacturing scythes from imported steel. Four years later, he obtained a contract to make pistols and began to add a factory to the mill building.

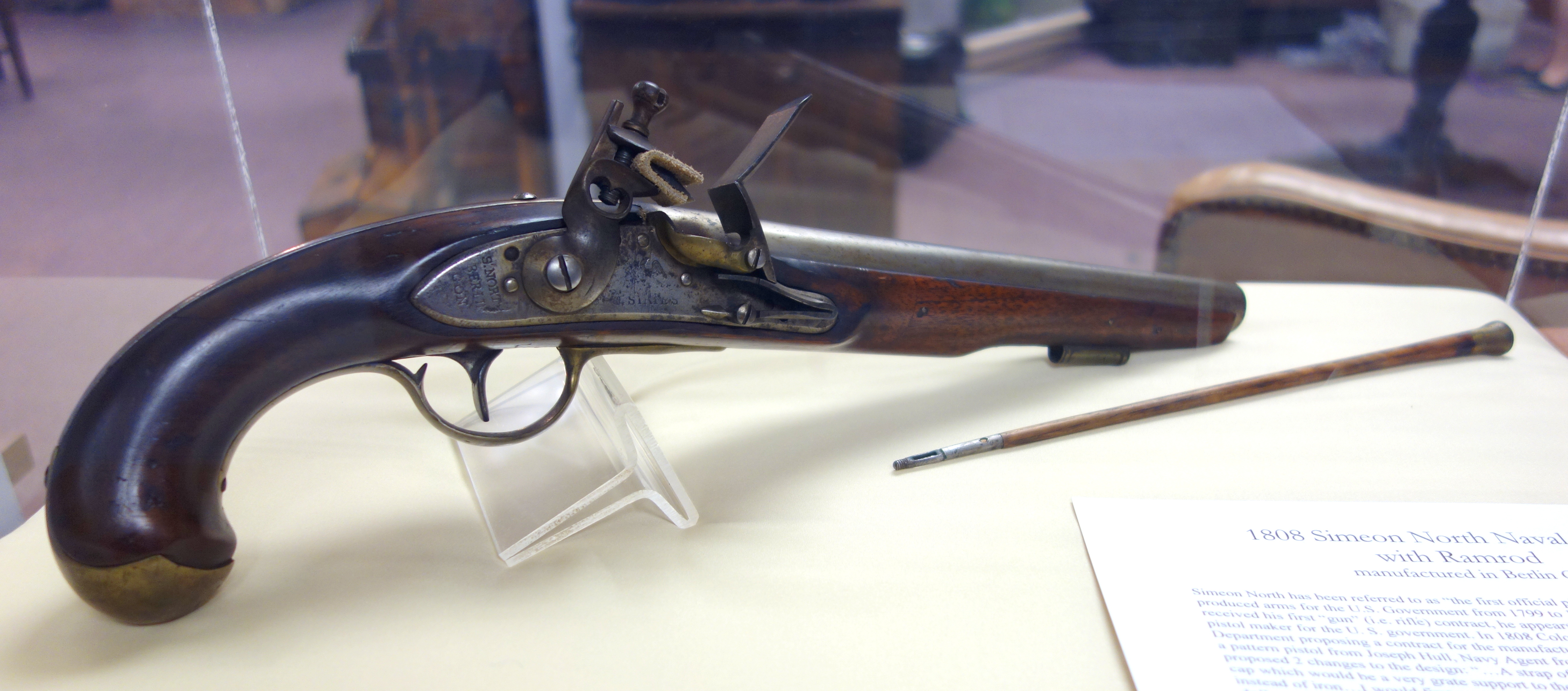
Simeon North naval pistol with ramrod, 1808

North's brother-in-law Elisha Cheney was a skilled clockmaker, a trade he had learned from his father Benjamin and uncle Timothy Cheney, two of the finest clockmakers in Connecticut. In 1810, Elisha Cheney moved his clock-making shop to the next waterpower site upstream from North. Although Cheney was trained as a maker of fine clocks in brass and other materials, Eli Terry, a clockmaker who had trained as a clockmaker with either Timothy or Benjamin Cheney, had just invented a method of producing the parts for wooden shelf, or pillar-and-scroll clocks that enabled them to be mass-produced using interchangeable parts. Cheney used his new plant to mass-produce parts that manufacturers were turning out in emulation of Eli Terry's innovation. Cheney is known to have also produced screws and small metal parts in his mill for the pistols his brother-in-law was manufacturing just downstream.

North is now generally credited with the invention of the milling machine, the first entirely new type of machine invented in America and one which, by replacing filing, made the production of interchangeable parts practicable.

By 1813, North had signed a government contract to produce 20,000 pistols that specified that parts of the lock had to be completely interchangeable between any of the 20,000 locks: the first contract of which any such evidence exists. It was during this period that North is believed to have invented a milling machine, which was able to shape metal mechanically and thus replaced filing by hand. Historian Diana Muir believes that he accomplished this around 1816. According to Muir's book Reflections in Bullough's Pond, North "was the first arms maker to implement a number of machine production techniques, yet he cautiously halted his pursuit of mass-produced, interchangeable parts" whenever it became apparent that it was uneconomic. For some time, interchangeable-part manufacturing in metal continued to be a combination of machine-made parts and human skill in filing machined parts to precise size for such high-end uses as military weapons, in which interchangeable parts were worth paying for at high prices (they were worth high prices because an army on campaign could cannibalize damaged weapons for parts).

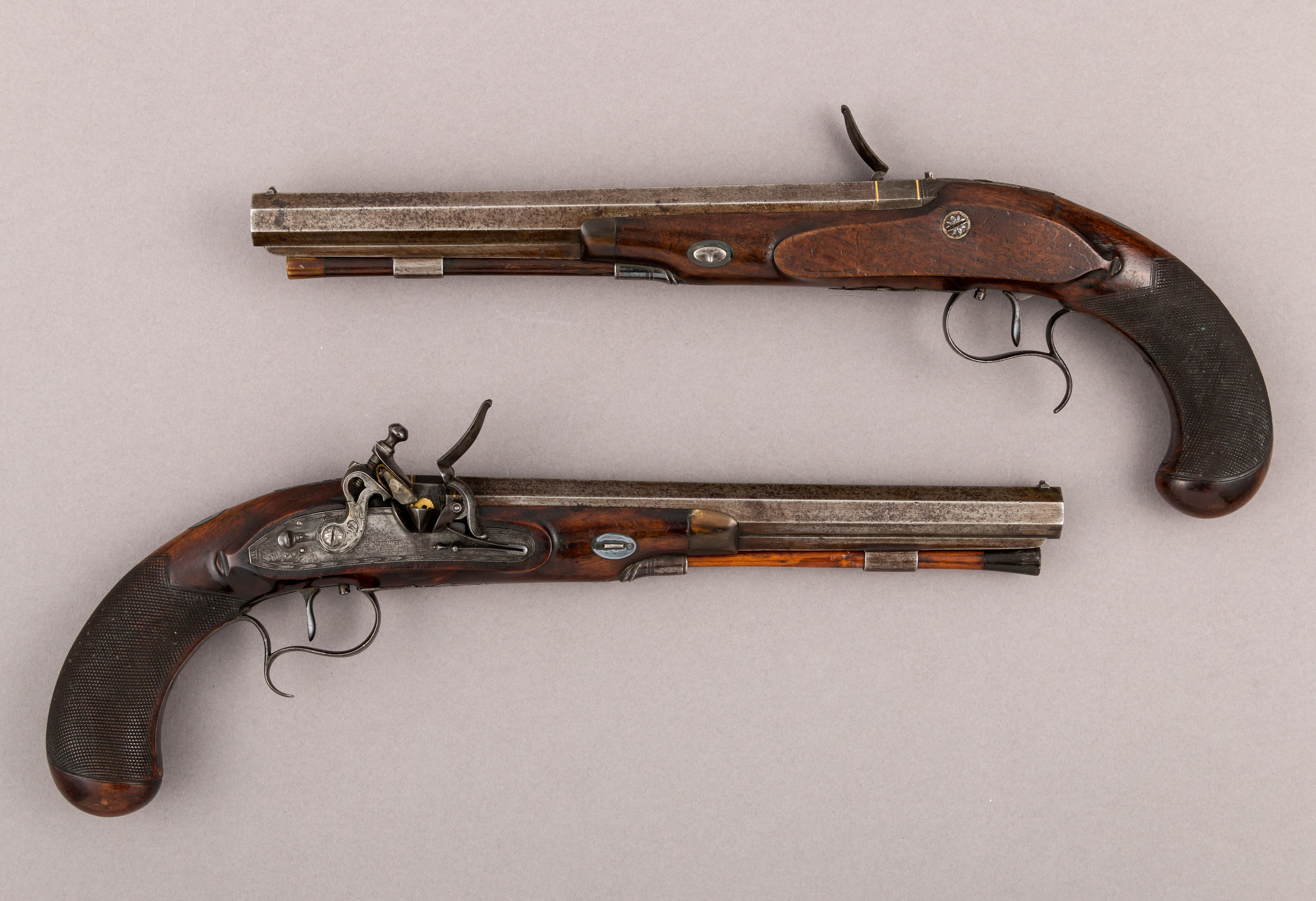
A pair of flintlock, duelling pistols made by Simeon North, ca. 1815–20. Metropolitan Museum of Art, accession Number: 96.5.36, .149. They are marked S NORTH Middletown, Conn.

As North's business grew, he moved it from Berlin to nearby Middletown.

At about that time, North was sent to Captain John H. Hall, superintendent of the federal armory at Harpers Ferry, Virginia (now in West Virginia), to introduce his methods of achieving interchangeability. In 1828, North received a contract to produce 5,000 Hall rifles with parts interchangeable with those produced at Harpers Ferry. North had a 53-year contractual relationship with the United States Department of War. The report of Charles H. Fitch prepared for the 1880 Census credits North with a key role in developing manufacture with interchangeable parts.

== Bibliography ==
- Fitch, Charles H. (1882), Extra Census Bulletin. Report on the manufacture of fire-arms and ammunition., Washington, DC, USA: United States Government Printing Office.
- Muir, Diana (2000), Reflections in Bullough's Pond: Economy and Ecosystem in New England, University Press of New England, ISBN 978-0-87451-909-9.
- North, Simon Newton Dexter; North, Ralph H. (1913), Simeon North: First Official Pistol Maker of the United States: A Memoir, Concord, NH, USA: Rumford Press, ISBN 9780598747723.
