= Michael McCurdy =

American illustrator and publisher

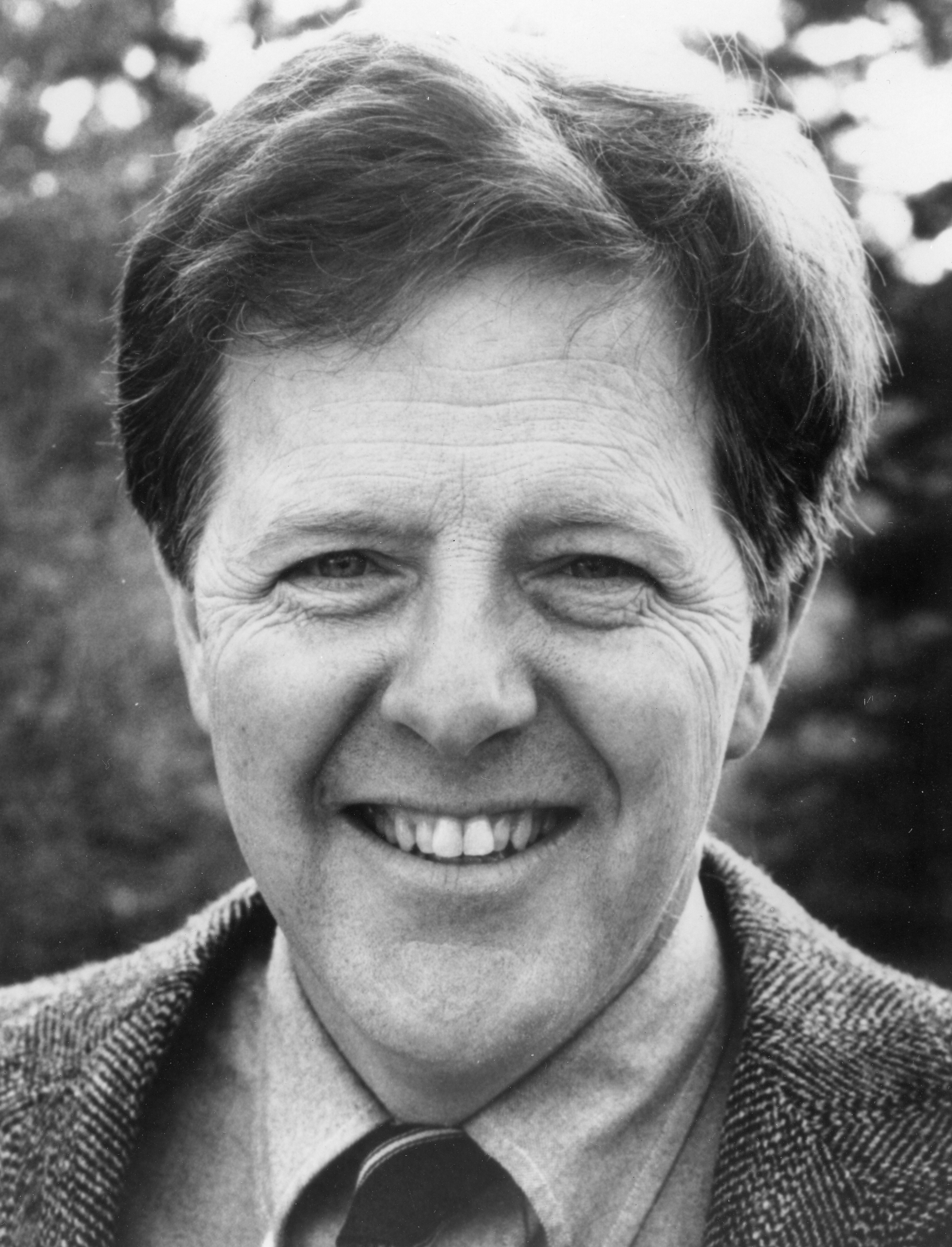
- Michael McCurdy c. 1985
- Born: February 17, 1942; New York City, New York, U.S.
- Died: May 28, 2016 (aged 74); Springfield, Massachusetts, U.S.
- Known for: Illustrator, author
- Spouse: Deborath Lamb
- Children: 2

Michael McCurdy (February 17, 1942 – May 28, 2016) was an American illustrator, author, and publisher. He illustrated over 200 books in his career, including ten that he authored. Most were illustrated with his trademark black and white wood engravings, with occasional color illustrations. His illustrations often have historical or natural themes.

== Biography ==
Michael McCurdy was born in New York City in 1942 and grew up in New Rochelle, New York and Marblehead, Massachusetts. As a young boy, he was inspired by illustrator Lynd Ward, writing him a fan letter in his teen years that evolved into a lifelong friendship and collaboration. He also developed an interest in hand-printing, thanks to a toy printing press that he received as a present at the age of twelve.

From 1960 to 1966, McCurdy attended the School of the Museum of Fine Arts in Boston, Massachusetts, where he completed his first wood engraving in 1963 and met his longtime friend and collaborator Robert Hauser. While he was at the Museum School, his roommate was David M. McPhail, the well-known children's book author and illustrator. Another future children's book illustrator, Wallace Tripp, was also in the printmaking department. At Tufts University, McCurdy earned a Bachelor of Fine Arts in 1964 and a Master of Fine Arts in 1971. He served as an Instructor at the School of the Museum of Fine Arts from 1966-1967, at Concord Academy from 1972-1975, and at Wellesley College Library Rare Book Print Lab from 1975-1976.

A conscientious objector during the Vietnam War, McCurdy worked for two years as an orderly in the orthopedic ward at Children's Hospital in Boston to fulfill his alternative service. He married Deborath Lamb McCurdy on September 7, 1968. When he was released from hospital duty in 1969, he and his wife used his Museum of Fine Arts award of a traveling fellowship to spend nearly five months traveling throughout Europe and the Soviet Union.

In the following years, the couple raised their two children in Lincoln and Great Barrington, Massachusetts. After retiring, McCurdy and his wife lived in Springfield, Massachusetts. He died on 28 May 2016 at the age of 74.

== Penmaen Press ==
McCurdy founded Penmaen Press in Boston, Massachusetts in 1968 and continued production in Lincoln and Great Barrington. Penmaen Press published many high quality literary works, including first-edition poetry, fiction, and translation by leading American and European writers and poets. These writers included William Saroyan, Joyce Carol Oates, Howard Norman, William Stafford, Allen Ginsberg, Richard Eberhart, Robert Steiner, William Ferguson; and the Nobel Prize winning poet Vicente Aleixandre.

Penmaen Press also produced broadsides of poems by May Sarton, Lawrence Ferlinghetti and Allen Ginsberg. A limited edition broadside of “Moloch” (taken from Allen Ginsburg’s poem Howl) was illustrated by Lynd Ward in 1978.

In 1984, McCurdy and Robert Hauser formed a partnership to produce Face to Face: Twelve Contemporary American Artists Interpret Themselves in a Limited Edition of Original Wood Engravings. Engravers who submitted self-portraits for this were McCurdy, Fred Becker, Jack Coughlin, John DePol, Fritz Eichenberg, Raymond Gloeckler, James Grashow, Judith Jaidinger, Stefan Martin, Barry Moser, Gillian Tyler, and Herbert Waters.

Penmaen Press was discontinued in 1985, as McCurdy devoted himself increasingly to writing and illustrating trade books, as well as limited editions for other publishers.

== Works ==
Throughout his career, McCurdy illustrated books, greeting cards, corporate commissions, and logos (including those for The New Yankee Workshop and Martha Stewart). McCurdy's wood engravings and drawings are found in trade books for both adults and children and in fine limited editions. Books of note for which McCurdy provided illustrations include The Man Who Planted Trees by Jean Giono (1985), an illustrated version of The Gettysburg Address by Abraham Lincoln (1995), American Tall Tales by Mary Pope Osborne (1991), Lucy’s Summer and Lucy’s Christmas by United States Poet Laureate Donald Hall, Tales of Adam by Daniel Quinn, and a limited edition of American Buffalo by David Mamet (1992). He also designed and illustrated the John Muir Library Series for Sierra Club Books. Throughout his career, McCurdy illustrated several books and items relating to Walden by Henry David Thoreau, including a sesquicentennial edition published in 2004 with 50 new wood engravings.

McCurdy also authored numerous books, including Toward the Light (a collection of his wood engravings with accompanying anecdotes, published in Canada), The Illustrated Harvard: Harvard University in Wood Engravings and Words (1986), The Devils Who Learned to be Good, Hannah's Farm: The Seasons on an Early American Homestead, The Old Man and the Fiddle, Trapped by the Ice: Shackleton's Amazing Antarctic Adventure and An Algonquian Year: The Year According to the Full Moon. He edited and illustrated an abridged version of the first autobiography of Frederick Douglass, renamed Escape from Slavery: The Boyhood of Frederick Douglass in His Own Words, published in 1994.

== Awards ==
Howard Norman's The Owl-Scatterer included McCurdy’s engravings and book design and was chosen by The New York Times as one of the Ten Best Illustrated Children's Books of 1986. Ann Whitford Paul's book The Seasons Sewn: The Year in Patchwork received the same recognition from the Times in 1996.

McCurdy’s collection of engravings, Toward the Light, was awarded the Bronze Medal in an international book exhibition in Leipzig in 1983. Other books have received awards from the New England Book Show and the American Institute of Graphic Arts.

McCurdy was elected a member of the Boston Society of Printers in 1971 and was selected as a Literary Light by the Associates of the Boston Public Library in 2002.

Giants in the Land, a children's picture book that McCurdy illustrated with black and white scratchboard, won numerous prizes.

== Archives ==
The main archive of McCurdy's work as an author and illustrator, covering a period of 48 years, is housed in the Boston Public Library. Original work, dating from McCurdy's first wood engraving in 1962 to later work for both adults and children, is included along with correspondence with authors and publishers, initial sketches, proofs, and wood blocks.

McCurdy’s Penmaen Press archive is housed in the Thomas J. Dodd Research Center, University of Connecticut, Storrs. The UCONN archive preserves books and ephemera printed and published at McCurdy's Penmaen Press from 1969 to 1985. The work includes first-edition books of poetry, fiction and translation, as well as correspondence.
