= Yoni Appelbaum =

American historian and journalist

- Born: 1979 or 1980 (age 46–47)
- Education: Brandeis University (PhD); Columbia University (BA)
- Occupations: Politics Editor, The Atlantic
- Known for: Social and cultural historian, Journalist
- Political party: Democratic
- Spouse: Emily Pressman
- Children: 2
- Parent(s): Diana Muir Karter; Paul S. Appelbaum
- Family: Binyamin Appelbaum (brother); Peter Karter (grandfather); Trish Karter (aunt)

Yoni Appelbaum is an American historian and journalist. He is a senior editor for politics at The Atlantic, where he was previously a columnist.

== Early life and education ==
Appelbaum was born to Diana Muir Karter and Paul S. Appelbaum and was raised in Newton, Massachusetts. He has a brother, Binyamin Appelbaum, and a sister. His grandfather is nuclear engineer Peter Karter. His aunt is entrepreneur Trish Karter. After graduating from the Maimonides School in Brookline, Massachusetts, Appelbaum graduated from Columbia University in 2003 and then obtained a Ph.D. in history from Brandeis University in 2014.

== Career ==
Appelbaum taught at Harvard University. His academic work focused on the Gilded Age.

In the March 2019 issue of The Atlantic, Appelbaum wrote a long-form article making the case for the impeachment of President Donald Trump. According to Margaret Sullivan writing in The Washington Post, Appelbaum's essay is the article that "moved... impeachment, all-but-taboo in Big Media's coverage of Trump,...., from the margins into the mainstream — across the journalism spectrum."

== Personal life ==
In 2004, Appelbaum married Emily Pressman of Wilmington, Delaware, in a Jewish ceremony at Columbia University. They had been dating since they were in college. They have two children.

== Publications ==
- Stuck: How the Privileged and the Propertied Broke the Engine of American Opportunity (2025, Random House) ISBN 978-0-5934-4929-5
