= Bullough's Pond =

Pond in Newton, Massachusetts

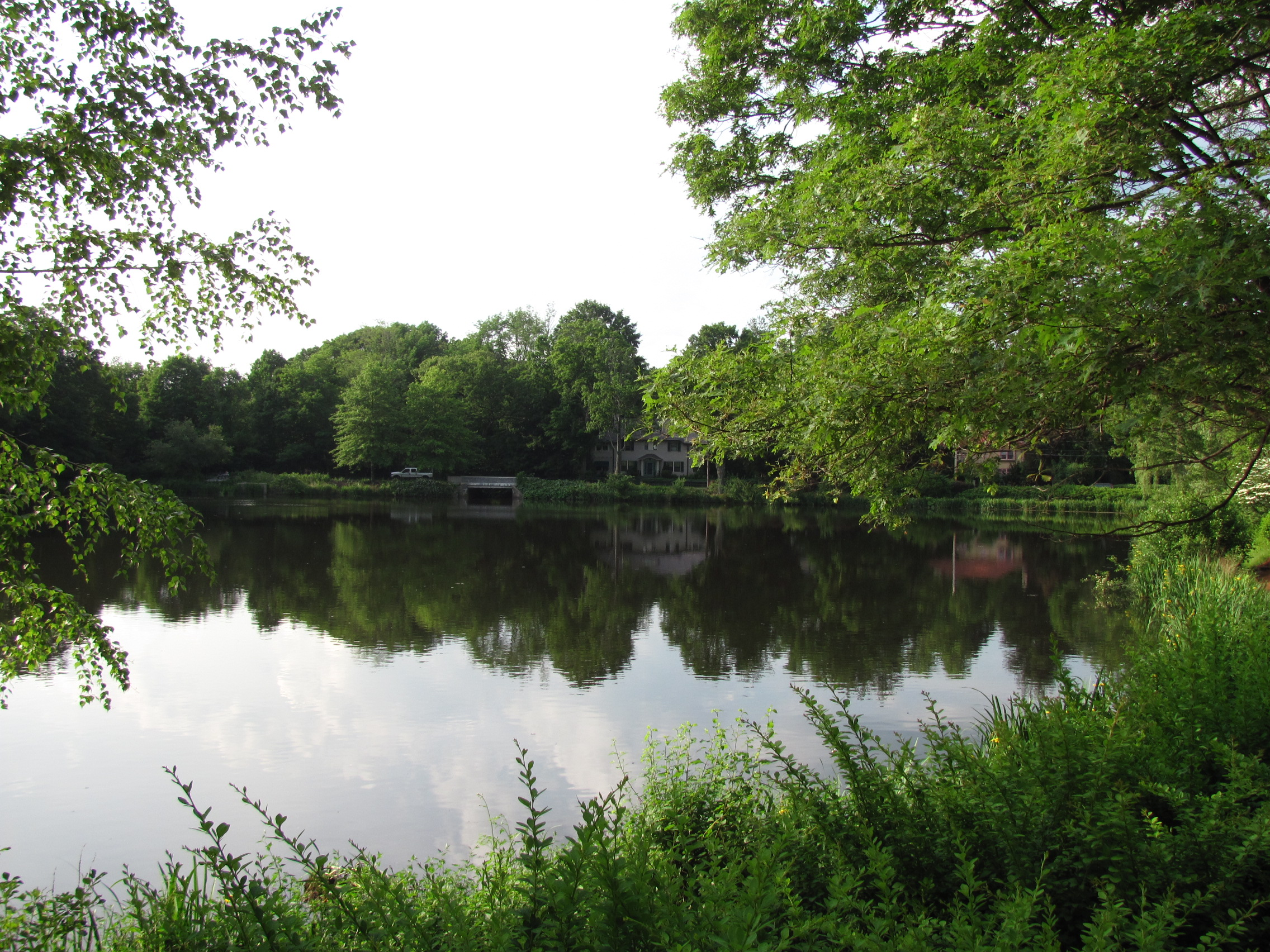
- Bullough's Pond

- Location within Greater Boston area Location within Massachusetts Location within the United States
- Location: Newton, Massachusetts
- Coordinates: 42°20′25.27″N 71°12′19.41″W
- Type: mill pond
- Basin countries: United States

Bullough's Pond, a former mill pond located in Newton, Massachusetts, is now a 6.9 acre decorative pond in a suburban neighborhood, used for bird watching and walking. In the nineteenth century it was the site of a commercial ice business. Since the early 2000s, temperatures have warmed to the point that its winter ice is no longer thick enough to support skating safely.

== History ==
The pond was created in 1664, initially to power flour production. It was formed when Captain John Spring had built a dam across Laundry Brook. Railroad service from Boston to the village of Newtonville was introduced in 1834. The following year, John Bullough purchased a share of John Spring's mill.

A fair was held in 2013 to mark the 350th anniversary of the pond.

During the COVID-19 pandemic, the pond was especially popular for Newton's residents.

== Condition and Safety ==
The Massachusetts Office of Dam Safety (ODS) of the Massachusetts Dept. of Conservation and Recreation (DCR) requires "requires that earth embankment dams be maintained free of the existence of trees and woody growth." In early 2018, the State of MA undertook a survey of Bulloughs Pond and in July 2018 issued a dam safety order to the City of Newton.

According to the ODS, which reports to the National Inventory of Dams, the hazard potential of the Bulloughs Pond Dam is "significant" and the condition assessment is "poor." The Department of Conservation and Recreation (DCR) on July 16, 2018 advised the City of Newton that injury to individuals or damage to the property of others caused by a dam breach could result in the City being responsible and held liable.

== Books ==
- Once Around Bullough's Pond: A Native American Epic, Douglas Worth, 1987
- Reflections in Bullough's Pond: Economy and Ecosystem in New England, Diana Muir, University Press of New England, 2000. Winner of the Massachusetts Book Award, 2001

== Films ==
A scene from "The Women," starring Annette Bening and Meg Ryan, was filmed on the pond.

== Notable residents ==
- Alex Beam
- Diana Muir

== Image gallery ==
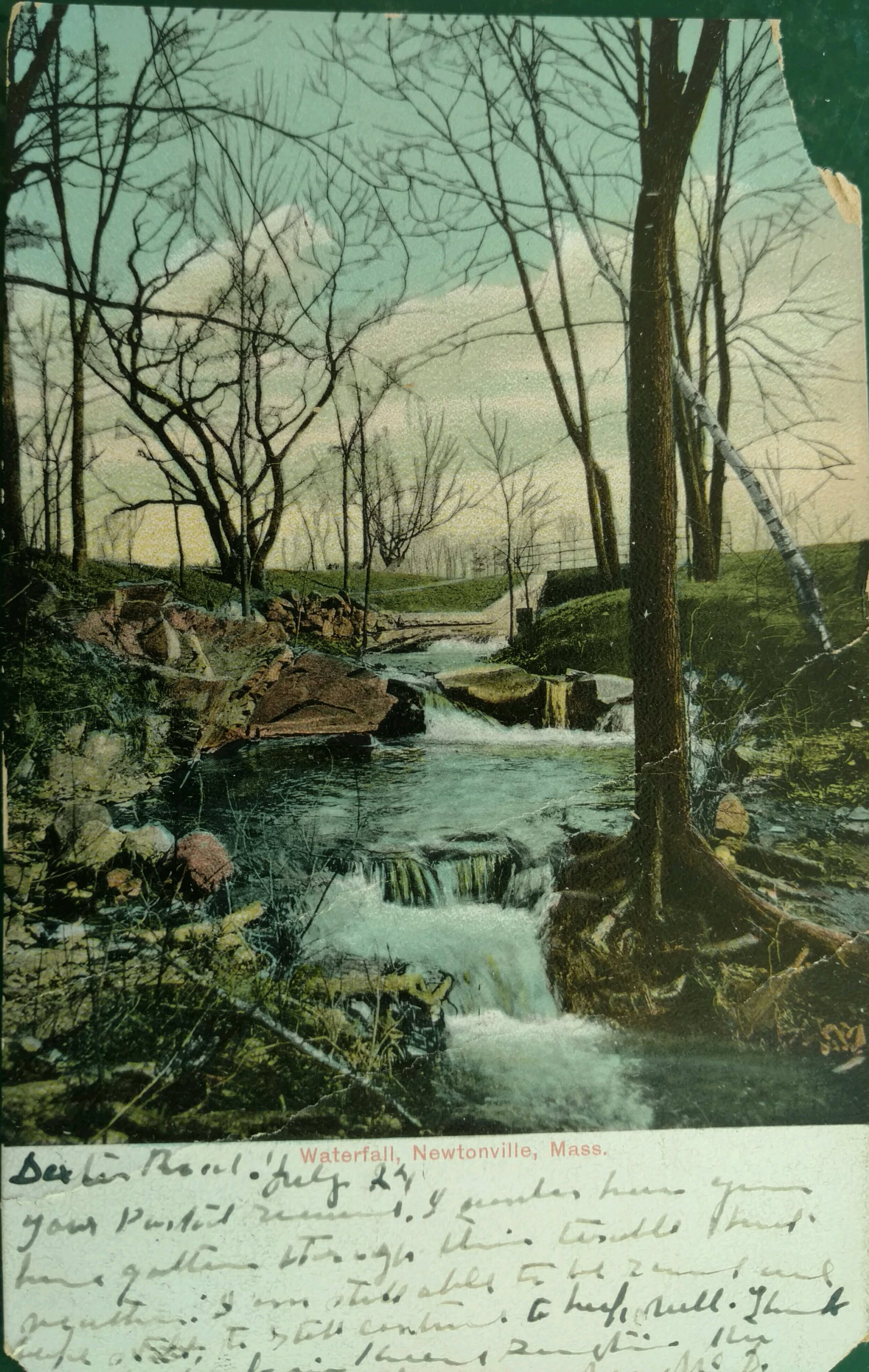
An early-20th-century postcard of Laundry Brook below Bullough's Pond dam

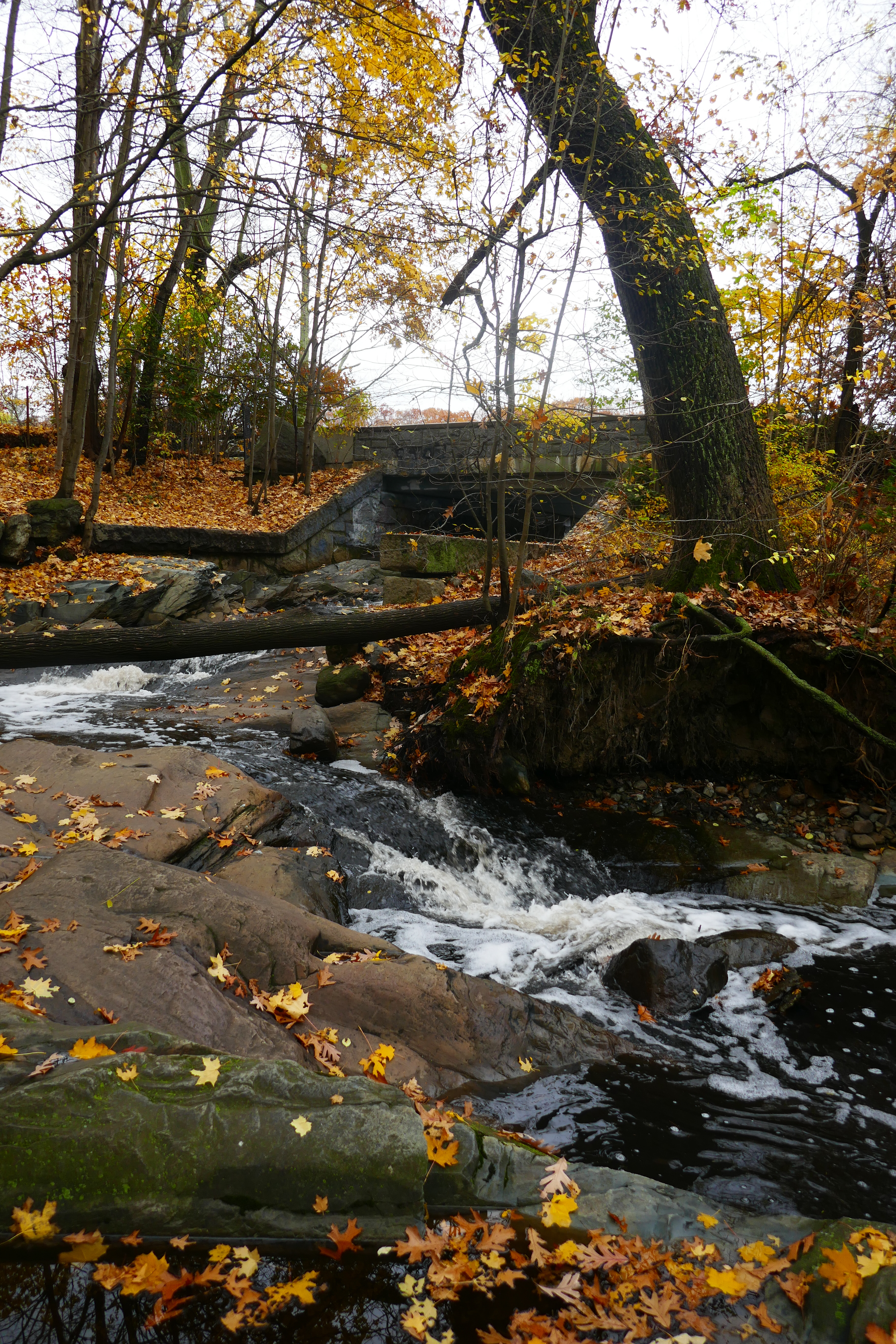
Laundry Brook in 2016

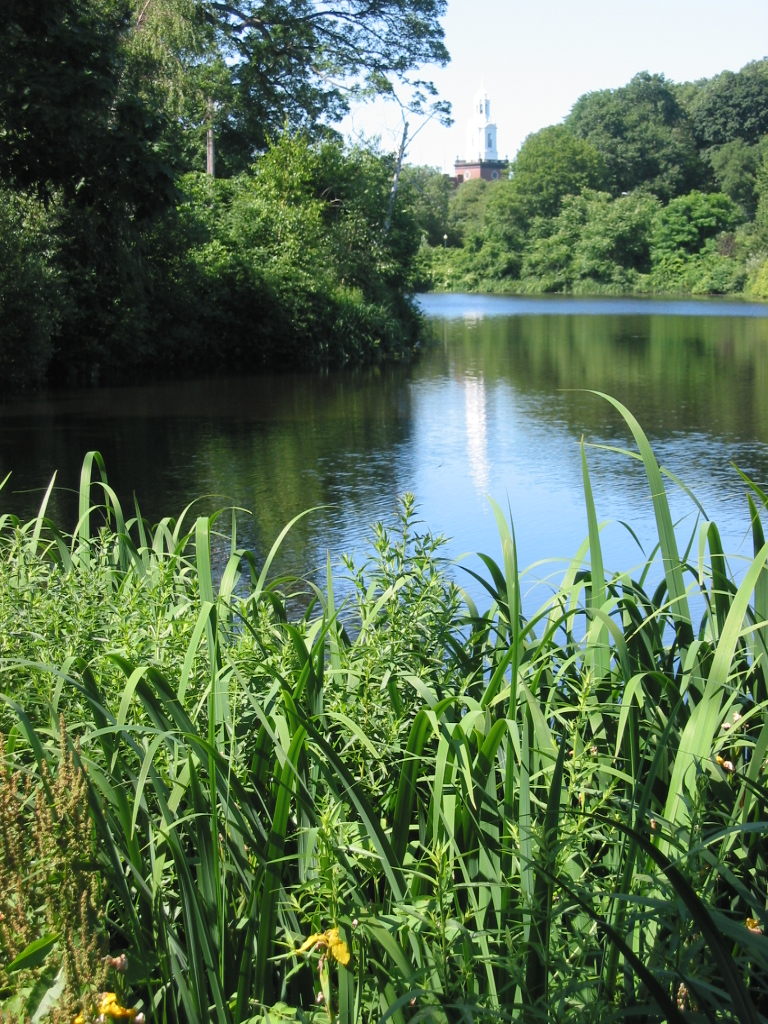
Bullough's Pond with Newton City Hall in the distance

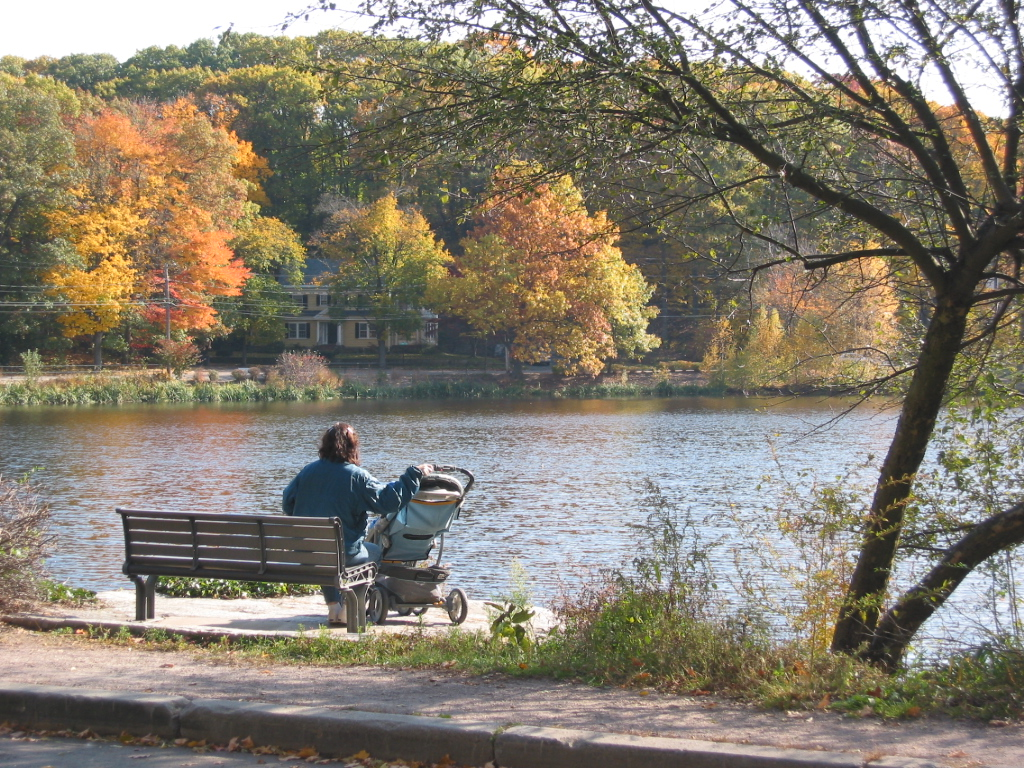
The pond in fall

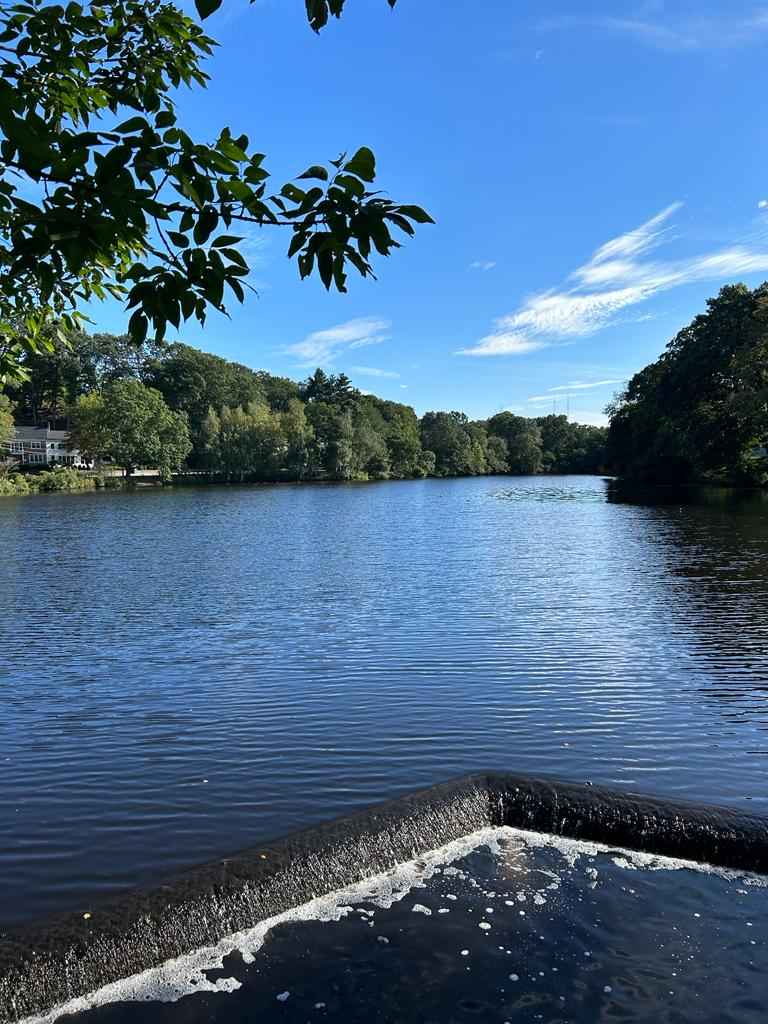
Bullough's Pond in September 2023
