= Maimonides School =

Jewish school in Brookline, Massachusetts, USA

- Hebrew: ישיבת רמב"ם

Location
- 34 Philbrick Road Brookline, MA 02445; United States; 42°19′48.33″N 71°07′50.14″W

Information
- Type: Private Jewish day school
- Religious affiliation: Judaism
- Denomination: Modern Orthodox
- Established: 1937
- Founder: Rabbi Dr. Joseph B. Soloveitchik
- CEO: Yaakov Green
- Principals: Dov Huff
- Grades: 2yrs–12
- Gender: Coeducational
- Enrollment: 430
- Campus type: Suburban
- Athletics conference: MIAA District H (Independent)
- Sports: 7 varsity sports
- Team name: M-Cats
- Newspaper: Spectrum
- Yearbook: Halapid
- Website: www.maimonides.org

Maimonides School (Hebrew: ישיבת רמב"ם Yeshivat Rambam) is a coeducational, Modern Orthodox, Jewish day school located in Brookline, Massachusetts. The school was founded in 1937 by Rabbi Joseph Soloveitchik and his wife Tonya Soloveitchik. It is named after Rabbi Moses Maimonides.

Today, Maimonides is a Torah institution with approximately 550 students from early childhood (2–4 years) through grade twelve with over 2,000 alumni, including multiple Rhodes Scholars, National Merit Scholars, prominent professors, scientists and business leaders. More than 325 of them are living in Israel.

== Campus ==
Maimonides School currently is situated on a 4-acre (16,000 m^{2}) campus in central Brookline, and is housed in one building.

=== Saval Campus ===
The Saval campus, named after Maurice Saval, a longtime school Chairman and benefactor, includes the Elementary School (kindergarten through grade five), Middle School (grades six through eight), Upper School (grades nine through twelve), business office, and other administrative offices. Other features of the Saval campus are the Judge J. John Fox gymnasium, S. Joseph Solomont Synagogue, 22,000 volume Levy library and Beit Midrash (house of religious Judaic study), laboratories, a student lounge, and additional office and study space. The inner courtyard includes a SprinTurf playing surface—the Ezra Schwartz Field—for outdoor play. The Esther Edelman Learning Center has undergone a cosmetic upgrade with new furniture, computers, air-conditioning and thermal pane windows. The Middle School level includes the Study Zone, a nurse's office, an art room, a science lab and a social worker's office.

=== Brener building ===
Between 1998-2019, the elementary school was housed in the Brener building, which is across the street from the Saval building, where the Elementary School had formerly been. In addition to classrooms, the building contained a lunchroom, small gym, admissions office, and library. Grades E2 - 5 also had their own playground for recess.

The Brener building is named for Leonard Brener, noted philanthropist (to Maimonides and the Perkins School for the Blind among other educational causes). A decorated detective with the Boston Police Department, Mr. Brener was known affectionately as 'Brennan' to his (mostly Irish) coworkers. After his retirement from law enforcement, he became a financial advisor, achieving the rank of Senior Vice President with Dean Whitter Reynolds. In addition to the Brener building itself, Mr. Brener donated the art room on the Saval campus in memory of his sister.

Nearing the end of the 2018-2019 school year, it was announced that due to decreased enrollment and a tighter budget, the following year the Elementary School would be moving back into the Saval building. Brookline Public Schools currently rent out the Brener building.

== Student activities ==
=== Current clubs and activities ===
The following is an incomplete list of different middle and upper school student-run clubs and organizations, and other extracurricular activities (listed alphabetically):

- School Newspaper (Spectrum)

Published on the first day of every month, Spectrum contains school news, world news, sports, entertainment, world language, and opinion sections. Spectrum is now online at http://www.maimospectrum.com.

- Mock trial

The 2009 team was the most successful team in Maimonides history having won the Massachusetts State Championship. The National Competition in Atlanta, Georgia accommodated Maimonides School in allowing the team to compete on Friday, thereby allowing the students to keep Shabbat-observance. Because of this deviation, the power ranking system did not apply to Maimonides, and the team was placed in the ranking at number 20, tied with Maine. The only previous time the team had qualified for the Massachusetts State Tournament was a Sweet 16 finish in 2006. The 2010 team reached the Sweet 16, the 2012 team reached the Final 4, and the 2013 team reached the Elite Eight. The 2021 team had a Sweet 16 finish in the Massachusetts State Tournament, competing for the first time over Zoom, due to the Covid-19 Pandemic.

- Model United Nations Annually, the Maimonides School delegation receives multiple awards at the Yeshiva University National Model United Nations.
- Troop 54, Boy Scouts of America
- Chessed Committee who coordinate seasonal supply-drives, volunteer days, and awareness speakers.
- Chidon Hatanach (National Bible Contest)- Menachem Shindler, the 2009 North American Champion, won 2nd in the Diaspora and 5th in the World contests in the Yom Haatzmaut Chidon HaTanach HaOlami contest. Alexander Kahan was the 2010 North American Champion, competed in the 2011 Chidon HaTanach HaOlami contest. Past Chidon HaTanach champions from Maimonides include Yechiel Robinson and Yochanan Stein.
- David Project Club which teaches students about current events and Israel Advocacy.
- Drama Club (produces annual high school drama production - http://www.freewebs.com/maimonidesdramaclub)
- Junior Achievement: Titan The 2006 Co-state-champion Titan team placed fourth in the northeast, and thirteenth nationally.
- Literary Magazine (The Current): Has won several awards in the past, noted for its creativity in original music pieces, photography, poetry, and short stories.
- The Weekly Briefing: A weekly newspaper containing articles about various news stories pertaining to the last week's worth of current events. The paper also posts the weekly schedule and events, a list of student birthdays, puzzles and trivia. It is posted every week.
- Math team

The 2006 team won second place in their division in the New England region.
The 2018 team came in first in a competition between over 150 Jewish day schools in the world.

- A Bisol Torah is a weekly student-run parsha publication.
- Student Council
- Book Club
- Yachad Board is a subgroup of Greater Boston Yachad, a chapter of Yachad/National Jewish Council for Disabilities
- Yearbook (Halapid)
- Mishmar Talmud

Once taught by Rabbi Dovid Shapiro, now taught by Rabbi Yaakov Jaffe. Each Thursday night following the days worth of classes, high school students are invited to learn extra Gemara.

== Athletics ==
Maimonides is a member of the Massachusetts Interscholastic Athletic Association. Interscholastic sports include basketball, soccer, softball, volleyball, and tennis. The school's teams are named the M-Cats. In November 2010, the school's athletic teams received the MIAA Sportsmanship Award in recognition of their good sportsmanship.

=== Boys teams ===
- Baseball (Varsity and Junior Varsity - Division III North)
- Intramural Football
- Basketball (Varsity, Junior Varsity and Middle School - Division IV North)
- Intramural Hockey
- Soccer (Varsity - Division III North)
- Tennis (Varsity & Junior Varsity)
- Wrestling (Varsity)

=== Girls teams ===
- Basketball (Varsity, Junior Varsity and Middle School - Division IV North)
- Intramural Hockey
- Soccer (Varsity - Division III North)
- Softball (Varsity - Division III North)
- Volleyball (Junior Varsity & Varsity - Division III North)
- Tennis (Varsity & Junior Varsity)

=== Students versus faculty ===
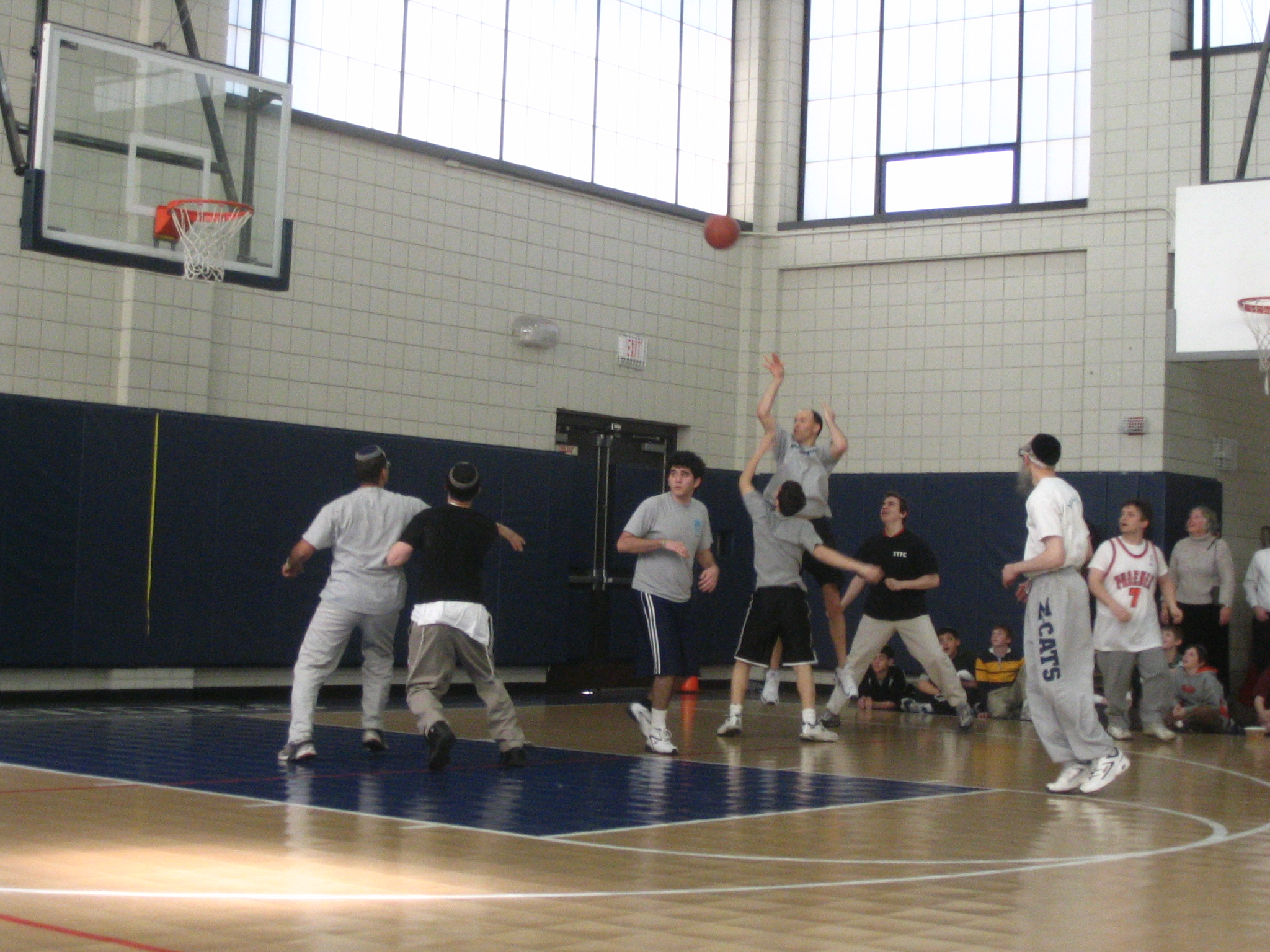
A teacher takes a shot in the 2006 seniors vs. faculty basketball game.

==== Faculty Basketball Game ====
This game is a longstanding tradition that matches the male members of the senior class against the male faculty in a game of basketball, proceeds from which are donated to charity. The 2008 game was particularly exciting, as the seniors raced back from a large deficit to tie and win the game in the last few minutes. In 2009 the faculty won the game for the first time, only to lose again by one point in 2010. In 2011 the game was an easy win for the seniors, but the faculty won again in 2012 and 2013. The faculty won in 2017. In an incredibly close game in 2018, the seniors beat the faculty.

== Tuition ==
Tuition for the 2023-2024 academic year is $38,340 for the high school.

== Controversies ==
=== Finances and governance ===
In late 2005, the school faced mounting budget deficits. To help alleviate the deficit, the School's Board of Directors initiated cost-cutting, layoffs, and an extraordinary fund-raising effort. The school successfully balanced its budget for 2006–07 and seemed to have achieved that with which most Jewish Day Schools continually struggle—correcting financial course without severely damaging enrollment or the quality of its education. At the same time, the school's governance structure changed. Formerly managed by a 7-member school committee, the school was now governed by a new board and a new board chair, Timberland CEO Jeff Swartz. The school committee became much smaller (3 members) and supervised only one person, the school's Rosh Yeshiva.

After the cost-cutting measures, the school was sued for age and gender discrimination by three of the laid-off teachers. On July 3, 2009, The Jewish Advocate reported on the outcome of the Deborah Onie case: "The court found, however, that the reason the school gave for not renewing the contract was non-discriminatory, as it related only to her refusal to accept the authority of [principals] Klammer and Posner. In 2005, Onie brought the allegation of age discrimination to the Massachusetts Commission Against Discrimination, the state's chief civil rights agency, which was unable to conclude that there was a violation of statutes." The Evelyn Berman and Phyllis Schwartz cases were settled out of court.

According to varying news reports, the private Maurice Saval trust, whose sole beneficiary is the school, lost between three and eight million dollars due to the Bernard Madoff scandal. In April 2009, the school did not renew several teacher contracts due to the financial crisis caused by the Madoff scam, and to increased demand for financial aid caused by the recession. The school also raised tuition 9.9% to meet rising expenses, its highest increase.

Additional teacher layoffs occurred in the spring of 2010 due to a decline in enrollment in the elementary and upper school divisions. Class sizes were increased and the number of high school sections was decreased. With these decreases in the number of faculty came an increase in the size of the administration. In 2009, Barry Ehrlich, a former NH high school history teacher and former Head of School of NYU Langone's Child Study Center was hired as the school's K-12 Director of Curriculum. In 2010, the administration was expanded again with the hiring of a high school assistant principal, Rabbi Dov Huff, an alumnus.

The school announced on May 6, 2018 that for the 2019 - 2020 school year that they plan on renting out the Brener building and consolidating all of the school into the Saval building in order to further reduce expenses.

== Notable alumni ==
- Binyamin Appelbaum '96, journalist at the New York Times
- Yoni Appelbaum ’98 politics editor of TheAtlantic.com and a senior editor of the Atlantic magazine.
- Etan Cohen '92, Hollywood screenwriter and Director
- Eliot Cohen '73, influential neo-conservative and professor of foreign policy at Johns Hopkins University
- Adam (AJ) Edelman, Olympian and 4x Israeli Champion in the sport of skeleton.
- Alex Edelman, Tony Award winning comedian
- Noah Feldman '88, Rhodes Scholar, Harvard law professor, critic of Modern Orthodoxy
- Marc Gopin '75, director of the Center on Religion, Diplomacy and Conflict Resolution, George Mason University
- Jessica Hammer, Professor of computer games at Carnegie Mellon University.
- Matthew Levitt '88, a senior fellow at The Washington Institute for Near East Policy, specializing in terrorism and US policy
- Asher Lopatin '82, Rhodes Scholar, former rabbi in ASBI Congregation in Chicago, president of Yeshivat Chovevei Torah
- Barry Lowenkron '69, former U.S. Assistant Secretary of State for Democracy, Human Rights, and Labor
- Esther Petrack '10, Contestant on Cycle 15 of America's Next Top Model
- Haym Soloveitchik '54, historian at Yeshiva University and the only son of Rabbi Joseph B. Soloveitchik
- Michael Strassfeld '67, rabbi, co-author of The Jewish Catalog
- Mayer Twersky '78, Rosh Yeshiva, Yeshiva University-RIETS
