= Paul S. Appelbaum =

American psychiatrist (born 1951)

- Born: 1951 (age 74–75)
- Education: Columbia University (BA); Harvard Medical School (MD)
- Occupation: Psychiatrist
- Spouse: Diana Muir Karter
- Children: 3 including Yoni Appelbaum and Binyamin Appelbaum
- Family: Peter Karter (father-in-law); Trish Karter (sister-in-law)

Paul Stuart Appelbaum (born 1951) is an American psychiatrist and a leading expert on legal and ethical issues in medicine and psychiatry.

Appelbaum has been Elizabeth K. Dollard Professor of Psychiatry, Medicine, and Law, and Director, Division of Law, Ethics, and Psychiatry, Department of Psychiatry, Columbia University College of Physicians and Surgeons since 2006. Appelbaum was President of the American Psychiatric Association (2002-2003) and President of the American Academy of Psychiatry and the Law (1995-1996).

Appelbaum is a member of the Standing Committee on Ethics of the World Psychiatric Association, and Chair of the APA's DSM Steering Committee. He was the Fritz Redlich Fellow at the Center for Advanced Study in the Behavioral Sciences; he was given the Isaac Ray Award of the American Psychiatric Association for "outstanding contributions to forensic psychiatry and the psychiatric aspects of jurisprudence." Appelbaum has been elected to the Institute of Medicine of the National Academy of Sciences, and is a Hastings Center Fellow.

Appelbaum is credited with conceptualizing the idea of the therapeutic misconception in which subjects in medical research studies misunderstand the primary purpose of their contact with the research team as treatment.

== Education and early career ==
Appelbaum is a graduate of Stuyvesant High School, Columbia College and Harvard Medical School. He completed his residency at the Massachusetts Mental Health Center in Boston. During his medical residency, Appelbaum studied as a special student at Harvard Law School. He describes his legal training as of "critical importance to my later career development." He then became assistant professor of psychiatry at the Western Psychiatric Institute, University of Pittsburgh Medical School. He credits the special student status he had at the Graduate School of Public Health, University of Pittsburgh while working as a young psychiatric research professor with helping him "move with greater assurance into empirical research on issues in law and psychiatry."

He returned to the Massachusetts Mental Health Center to serve as Executive Officer and as head of the Program in Psychiatry and Law for one year, before becoming the A. F. Zeleznik Distinguished Professor of Psychiatry, at the University of Massachusetts Medical School. He served for many years as chairman of the Department of Psychiatry and director of the Law and Psychiatry Program at the University of Massachusetts Medical School.

== Research ==
According to Appelbaum, his focus has always been on "trying to address the empirical questions that... inform and influence policy-related decisions."

His areas of particular expertise include the logic and practice of informed consent, the understanding of the influence of law on psychiatry, and the prediction of dangerousness so as to better guide psychiatric practice. His original work with Tom Grisso in the assessment of patient competency has had broad influence for research and better treatment of both civil and criminal patients.

He developed a theory of ethics for forensic psychiatry.

Since moving to Columbia College of Physicians & Surgeons in 2006, Appelbaum has focused on the medical, ethical and legal aspects of human genetic research. He leads the Center for Research on the Ethical, Legal and Social Implications of Psychiatric, Neurologic and Behavioral Genetics.

Appelbaum is a frequent media commentator on medical issues. The New York Times describes him as "a professor of psychiatry at Columbia who has published widely on medical ethics and the law."

== Awards, honors, memberships ==
Four of Appelbaum's books have received the Manfred Guttmacher Award from the American Psychiatric Association and the American Academy of Psychiatry and the Law. Appelbaum became President of the American Psychiatric Association in May 2002. He was President of the American Academy of Psychiatry and the Law, and of the Massachusetts Psychiatric Society. He has twice chaired the Council on Psychiatry and Law, and the Commission on Judicial Action for the American Psychiatric Association, and served as a member of the MacArthur Foundation Research Networks on Mental Health and the Law and on Mandated Community Treatment. He has received the Isaac Ray Award of the American Psychiatric Association for ‘outstanding contributions to forensic psychiatry and the psychiatric aspects of jurisprudence’.

== Personal life ==
Appelbaum grew up in Brooklyn, New York, the son of a letter carrier and a school teacher. He is married to Diana Muir Appelbaum; they have three adult children, Binyamin Appelbaum; Yoni Appelbaum; and Avigail Appelbaum and belong to Congregation Ramath Orah in Manhattan.

== Books ==
- The Clinical Handbook of Psychiatry and the Law, (3rd ed., 2000) with Thomas G. Gutheil.
- Almost a Revolution: Mental Health Law and the Limits of Change, (1994).
- Assessing Competence to Consent to Treatment: A Guide for Physicians and Other Healthcare Professionals, (1998) with Thomas Grisso.
- Divided Staffs, Divided Selves: A Case Approach to Mental Health Ethics, (1987) with Stanley Joel Reiser, Harold J. Bursztajn, and Thomas G. Gutheil.
- Rethinking Risk Assessment, (2001) with John Monahan, Henry J. Steadman, Eric Silver, Pamela Clark Robbins, Edward P. Mulvey, Loren H. Roth, Thomas Grisso, and Steven Banks.
