= Carpenito =

Carpenito is a surname. Notable people with the surname include:

- Craig Carpenito (born 1973), American lawyer
- Frank Carpenito, American businessman
