= Therapeutic misconception =

Ethical problem in human research

Therapeutic misconception is a common ethical problem encountered in human subjects research. It was originally described in 1982 by Paul Appelbaum and colleagues. The idea was introduced to the bioethics community in 1987. The formulation given by Appelbaum et al. in 1987 was the following: “To maintain a therapeutic misconception is to deny the possibility that there may be major disadvantages to participating in clinical research that stem from the nature of the research process itself.”

== Context and definitions ==
Therapeutic misconception did not receive great attention until the early 2000s, when references to the concept expanded significantly. Originally only used in the context of randomized controlled trials, the term is now commonly used among sociologists, neuroscientists, and clinical investigators.

=== Therapeutic misconception ===
Therapeutic misconception is detrimental to a subject's understanding of a study, which is crucial for an autonomous decision. Certain factors can increase the risk of therapeutic misconception, such as studies that are similar to clinical care in terms of research design or when subjects have a limited scope of available treatment, such as a terminal phase cancer patient who is not responsive to known treatments. Strategies to minimize therapeutic misconception include giving a clear description of the research procedures and goals (e.g. explaining study design, treatment allocation and the possibility of receiving a placebo since the allocation is randomized) and having a comprehensive discussion, with the subject, about the voluntary nature of participation and of available alternatives.

=== Therapeutic misestimation ===
Therapeutic misestimation may occur when subjects overestimate the benefits that a study can grant them or when they underestimate the potential risks associated with a particular study. What separates therapeutic misconception from therapeutic misestimation is that in therapeutic misestimation subjects overestimate the benefits of a trial even though they properly understand how research procedures differ from the care they would otherwise receive in clinical practice settings. Studies where the chances of high benefit for subjects are low or where benefits are unlikely can cause misestimation. One way to address this issue with subjects is to give specific information about the probability and magnitude of the risks and benefits in a particular study.

=== Therapeutic optimism ===
Therapeutic optimism occurs when a patient hopes for the best personal possible outcome. It is possible for subjects to maintain optimism, while demonstrating an understanding of both the nature of research and the probability of important risks and benefits. The expert medical community typically don't view optimism as ethically problematic largely because an optimistic outlook can help in a patient's healing process while still allowing them the understanding necessary to provide valid informed consent.

==== Unrealistic optimism ====
Patient optimism may "present an ethical problem for informed consent" if it is unrealistic: "optimism may also be the product of a bias in which a person believes that she is more likely to experience positive outcomes (or less likely to experience negative outcomes) than others similarly situated."

== See also ==
- Clinical trial
- Informed consent
- Belmont Report
- Guidelines for human subject research
