= Giants in the Land =

1993 children's book by Diana Appelbaum and Michael McCurdy

First edition

Giants in the Land is a children's picture book written by Diana Appelbaum and illustrated by Michael McCurdy. It was published by Houghton Mifflin Company in 1993.

== Plot ==
The story tells of tall white pine trees, trees "that stood taller than an apartment house 25 stories high, taller than the tallest building ever built in New Hampshire or Maine. Giant pine trees that had grown in the New England woods for thousands of years."

Michael McCurdy's black and white scratchboard illustrations give drama to the text.

== Awards ==
- Booklist, Top of the List, best juvenile nonfiction book for Youth
- Jefferson Cup – Virginia Library Association 1994 Honor Book
- Starred reviews in Publishers Weekly, Booklist, and Kirkus Reviews
- School Library Journal Best Book
- The Bulletin (Blue Ribbon winner)
- Yankee Magazine, 40 Classic New England Children's Books.
- An ALA Notable Book for Children
