= Cocoa Ice =

1997 children's book by Diana Appelbaum and Holly Meade

First edition

Cocoa Ice is a 1997 illustrated children's picture book by Diana Appelbaum, illustrated by Holly Meade. It was first published by Orchard Books.

Cocoa Ice tells parallel stories of two little girls, one in Maine, where ice is harvested on the rivers, the other in Santo Domingo, where cocoa beans are grown, who are linked by an 1870s Yankee trading schooner and its captain. The two little girls enjoy their different versions of "cocoa ice."

== Prizes and awards ==
- Lupine Award, Maine Library Association, Honor Book, 1997
