= Eli Terry =

American inventor

Eli Terry Sr.
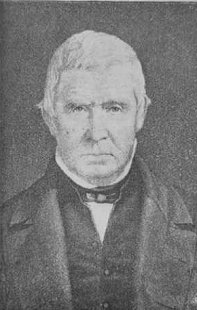
- Eli Terry Sr.
- Born: April 13, 1772; East Windsor, Connecticut Colony, British America
- Died: February 24, 1852 (aged 79); Plymouth, Connecticut, U.S.
- Scientific career
- Fields: Clockmaker

Eli Terry Sr. (April 13, 1772 – February 24, 1852) was an inventor and clockmaker in Connecticut. He received a United States patent for a shelf clock mechanism. He introduced mass production to the art of clockmaking, which made clocks affordable for the average American citizen. Terry occupies an important place in the beginnings of the development of interchangeable parts manufacturing. Terry is considered the first person in American history to actually accomplish interchangeable parts with no government funding. Terry became one of the most accomplished mechanics in New England during the early part of the nineteenth century. The village of Terryville, Connecticut is named for his son, Eli Terry Jr.

== Background ==
Terry was the son of Samuel and Huldah Terry, born in what is now South Windsor, Connecticut (at the time of Terry's birth, South Windsor was part of East Windsor, Connecticut).

He began his career as an apprentice under Daniel Burnap ("the forerunner of manufacturing"). It's also likely that he received limited instruction from Timothy Cheney, a clockmaker in East Hartford. Cheney specialized in the making of wooden clocks, which was fairly unusual at the time. The use of wooden components would show great influence in Terry's later career.

Terry's apprenticeship to Burnap ended in 1792, and he quickly established himself as both a clockmaker and a repairer of watches in East Windsor. Terry relocated to Northbury Connecticut in 1793, and helped incorporate Plymouth, Connecticut in 1795. Terry was appointed the town Sealer of Weights and Measures. His first clock shop was attached to his dwelling. Terry boarded girls like Candace Roberts to work in his shop painting clock dials. His second shop was considered the first water powered clock shop in the United States, and was built twenty feet square over Niagara Brook, which flowed through his property. Some of his earliest clocks were fitted with silvered brass dials, which were engraved for him by Burnap. The movements of the clock were made primarily of wood, or brass, depending on the requests of his customers. Brass was more commonly used for movements at the time, but it was also considerably more expensive and difficult to work with. In 1801, Terry was granted a patent on an equation clock. This was the first patent for a clock mechanism that was ever granted by the United States Patent Office.

== Career ==
In 1795, Terry invented his first milling machine to produce interchangeable parts. Terry crafted these milled movements until the Porter Contract. Soon after 1802, Terry's production of wooden clocks grew considerably. Like other Connecticut clockmakers, Terry knew that apprentices could cheaply rough-cut wooden wheels for more skilled journeymen to shape precisely into clockworks, making clocks slightly more cheaply. And Terry was one of a number of Connecticut clockmakers who began to substitute water-powered machines for apprentices in the production of these rough-cut wheels. In 1802 or 1803, Terry purchased a mill to produce wooden clock wheels, which still had to be finished by hand by skilled journeymen clockmakers. He purchased a grain mill and used the water wheel and main shaft to run saws and lathes, which helped speed the production of parts. He later created jigs and fixtures to produce a large number of interchangeable clock parts. This allowed for the rapid adjustment and assembly of clocks, freeing Terry from the task of fitting and modifying each individual piece of each clock. Using his own ingenuity and inventiveness, Terry was thus able to speedily cut wheels, pinions, and other important clock parts accurately and repetitively.

In the year 1806, Terry signed the Porter contract to produce 4,000 wooden clock movements (other shops would make the cases). According to historian Diana Muir writing in Reflections in Bullough's Pond, at that time a skilled craftsman could produce six to ten clocks per year. In the third year he produced 3,000 wooden clocks. He sold his manufactory to two of his assistants Seth Thomas and Silas Hoadley and retreated to his workshop to create the first machine in the world to be mass-produced using interchangeable parts.

Terry envisioned a new kind of clock, intended for mass production from machine-made parts that would come from water-powered machines ready to go into clocks without any additional hand cutting by skilled workmen. This would be a shelf clock, costing less than a tall clock. It would be made quickly and be easily repaired. Terry's further innovations included the design of an escapement with removable verge. This later became a standard design feature of American clocks for the following century. The mass-produced wooden clocks manufactured from interchangeable parts that poured from Terry's factory beginning in 1814 were the world's first mass-produced machines made of interchangeable parts. As such he would mass market an affordable, complete cased-clock to American consumers. Terry's first clocks were offered in plain wooden box cases. Terry is also credited with the design of the pillar and scroll case. In his autobiography, History of the American Clock Business for the Past Sixty Years and Life of Chauncey Jerome, Terry's employee and assistant Chauncey Jerome, later a great clockmaker and owner of the world's largest clock factory, mentions building the first pillar and scroll in Terry's workshop with the master's design and under his direction. The pillar and scroll case provided a large, clear dial in a wooden case about thirty inches tall and six inches deep. The upper part was the clock face, the lower part was either a mirror or a picture back-painted on glass. Despite the small size of the clocks compared with traditional long case clocks, Terry was able to provide sufficient power through gearing for the clock to run a full thirty hours before it needed to be rewound. Anticipating a successful product Terry had the foresight to patent his arrangement of clockworks. At least five patents were issued to him through the years up to 1825 in order to protect his invention.

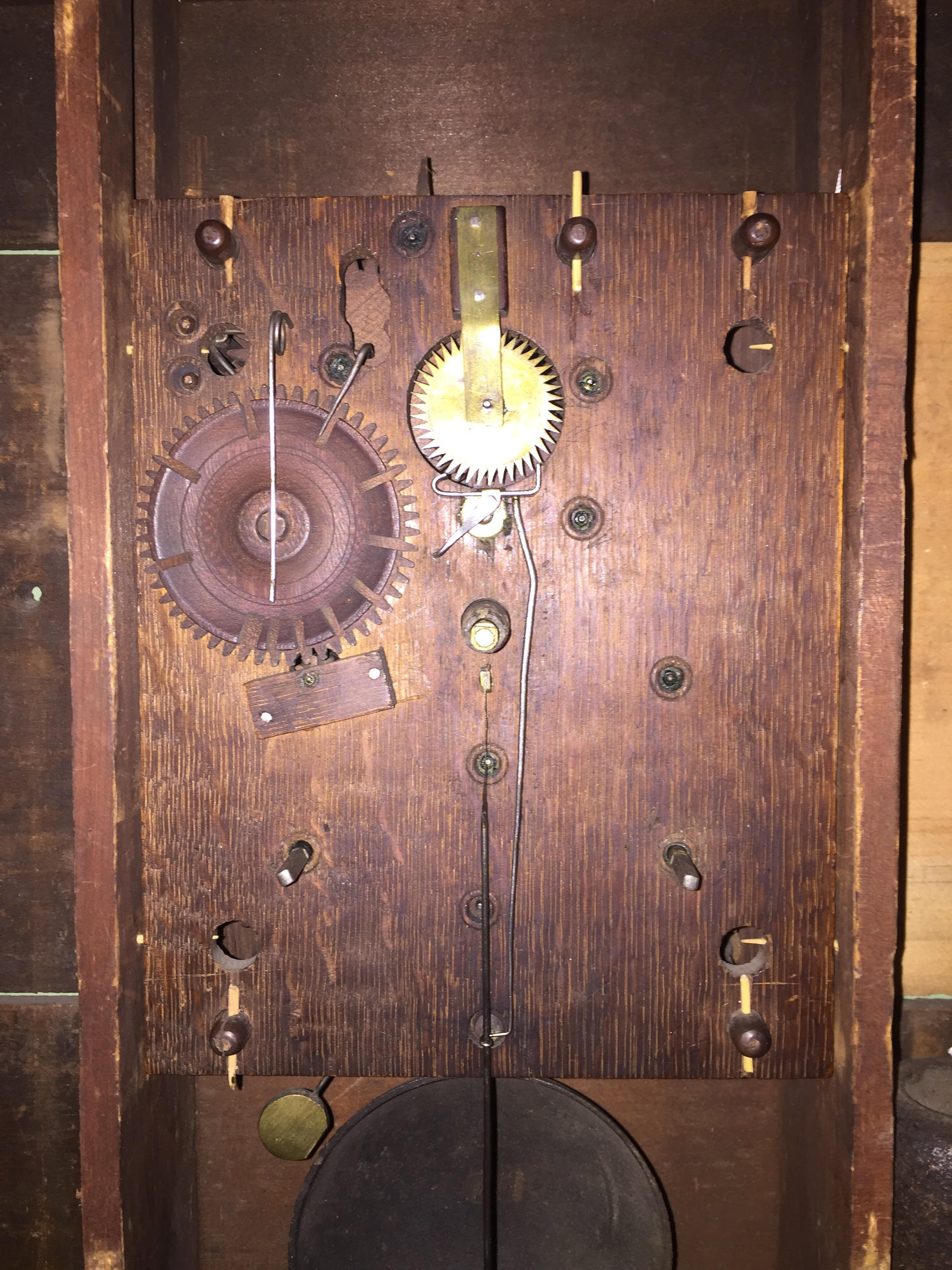
A wooden gear shelf clock movement made by Eli Terry, 1825

According to Diana Muir in Reflections in Bullough's Pond, within a few years, the clock industry in the Naugatuck Valley and Bristol grew rapidly. Soon, two dozen factories employed several hundred men to mass-produce identical Terry-style, thirty-hour wooden clocks. Salesmen then used innovative marketing tactics to boost demand for the devices by introducing installment-plan purchases and model changes of the cases to induce consumers who already owned a functional clock to buy a more fashionable model.

As noted Terry was granted many patents for his advances in clockmaking, most of which were immediately infringed upon by local competitors eager to participate in satisfying the demand for an affordable clock. Many competitors would note "patent clocks" on their label in order to prevent litigation. One lawsuit did develop as noted below.

Terry also produced wooden-movement tower clocks, such as those found in the steeples of churches and meeting houses, one of which is still operational today in the town of Plymouth.

== Tower clocks ==
Eli Terry made three tower clocks. His first, made entirely of wood, was donated to the Center Church on the Green at New Haven in 1825. The second movement was donated in 1828 to the Congregational Church of Plymouth Hollow (Later Thomaston Congregational Church). The movement was removed from the church and donated to the American Clock & Watch Museum in Bristol. Terry's third movement was donated to the Terryville Congregational Church in 1838. The movement was destroyed by fire in December of 1969. The movement from New Haven was removed from the steeple and reinstalled at the Plymouth Congregational Church in 1838, where it still runs today. The Plymouth tower clock movement is the only undisturbed original wooden gear tower clock in existence.

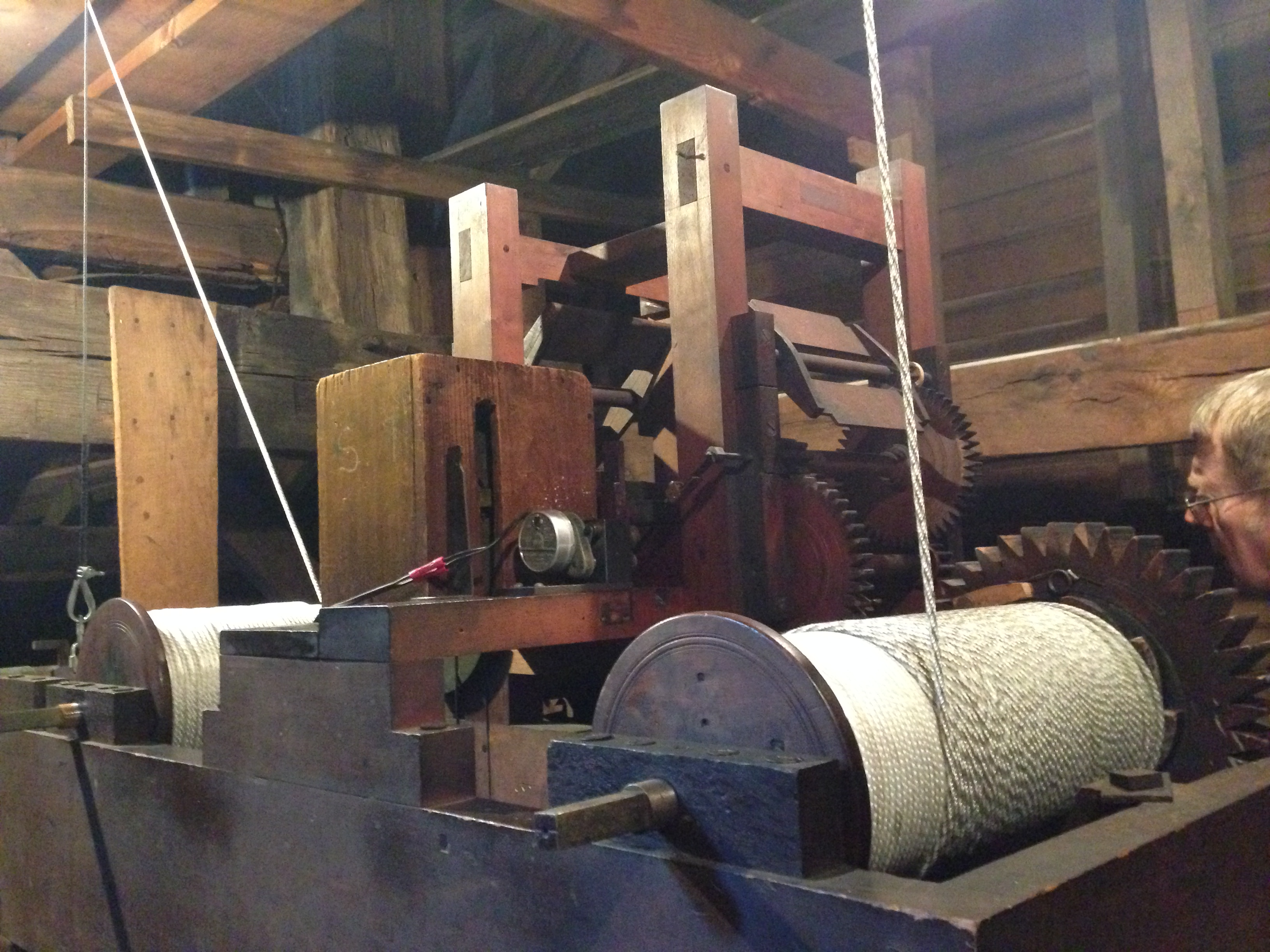
Wooden-gear tower clock installed at Plymouth Connecticut, 1838

== Heritage ==
Between 1808 and 1833, Terry focused the majority of his time and effort on the production of standardized wooden clocks, which helped him accumulate a modest fortune. By 1833, he was sufficiently satisfied with his material success. At this point, he abandoned involvement in quantity production, and returned to clockmaking as the world had known it before his innovations, focusing on the production of a few high-end special clocks and the development of original clock mechanisms. He also spent considerable time helping along the businesses of his sons. He continued with this small-scale clock production until his death on the last day of February 1852.

Terry's brother Samuel (1774–1853) was also involved in the production of wooden-movement clocks, and for several years he worked as Eli's partner, manufacturing improved pillar and scroll clocks after his brother's design.

Three of Terry's sons also became clockmakers. His son Eli Terry Jr. was the most notable, as the village of Terryville in Plymouth, Connecticut was named after him; he purchased the lock-making equipment that would eventually be used to form Eagle Lock Company, which for a long time was Terryville's biggest employer.

Silas B. Terry had many financial difficulties in his time, but was eventually a founding member of the Terry Clock Company.

Henry Terry, took over Eli Terry Sr's clock shop at "Terry's Bridge", after his retirement.

== Family ==
Eli Terry was born to Samuel and Huldah Burnham at East Windsor. His wife was Eunice Warner (Married March 12, 1795), and they had several children including: Anne (born 1796), Eli (born 1799), Henry (born 1801), James (born 1803), Silas Burnham (born 1807), Sarah Warner (born 1809), Huldah (born 1811), and George (born 1815). After Eunice Warner's death in 1839, he married Harriet A. Pond, and they had two children, one named Stephen.

== Bootleg Eli Terry clock designs ==
Eli Terry's success in mass-producing and selling an affordable shelf clock for the public provided much inspiration to other entrepreneurs in Connecticut and beyond. Immediately, Terry's former partners Seth Thomas and Silas Hoadley began making similar clocks. Others in the Bristol and Plymouth communities manufactured movements, cases or other clock parts for others to assemble and sell complete clocks in order to compete with Terry. Terry was forced to continually update his patents. Paradoxically his updated patents became very narrowly described and this enabled competitors to make slight changes to their design and evade patent infringement. In 1826-7, Eli Terry filed a lawsuit in Litchfield district court against Seth Thomas for patent infringement. Judgement was in favor of Terry but it is unclear if he ever collected compensation. Contemporary historians believe the suit was staged between the two principals in order to dissuade others from competition, but it is unclear that this is correct since Terry, unlike Thomas, was the least interested in the business side of mass clock production.

As one example of the frenzy at the time to copy Terry's designs, Reeves & Co made clocks in the United States to the Eli Terry design. These clocks copied the scrollwork and wooden movement of the original Eli Terry clocks. However, since the designs of these clocks were infringements of the Terry patents, Reeves & Co. were forced out of business and were also forced to destroy their stock of unsold clocks. Few genuine Reeves & Co. clocks still exist. One excellent example of an operating Reeves & Co. shelf clock is in the John Basmajian clock collection, in Altadena, California. Due to its rarity it is extremely valuable to collectors.

== Legacy ==
Eli Terry Elementary School, located only a few miles from Terry's childhood home in South Windsor, Connecticut, is named for the clockmaker. His likeness adorns a sign at the school's entrance.
