= Peter Karter =

American businessman (1922–2010)

- Born: Patayonis Karteroulis; 1922; Chicago, Illinois, U.S.
- Died: March 30, 2010 (aged 87–88); Chicago, Illinois
- Spouse: Elizabeth Whitman Karter
- Children: Trish Karter; Diana Muir Appelbaum
- Family: Binyamin Appelbaum (grandson)
- Scientific career
- Education: United States Military Academy (USMA); Harvard School of Engineering and Applied Sciences
- Known for: Replicable system for mixed recyclables PARR-Reactors
- Fields: Nuclear Engineering
- Workplaces: United States Army Corps of Engineers; American Machine and Foundry

Peter Karter (1922–2010) was an American nuclear engineer and one of the pioneers of the modern recycling industry. He lived in Old Lyme, Connecticut.

Karter was one of the leading innovators in materials recycling and the first to engineer a "replicable system for mixed recyclables."

== Personal life, education, and early career ==
Karter was born in Chicago, Illinois. The son of Greek immigrants, Karter spent part of his childhood in Anavryti, Greece, but his school years in the United States. He graduated from Morris High School (Bronx, New York), the United States Military Academy at West Point, and the graduate school of engineering at Harvard University.

Karter left college after his freshman year to join the army. Though he qualified as a behind-enemy-lines parachutist, Karter chose instead to attend West Point where Congress had authorized an expanded Corps of Cadets to supply trained officers for a war that might prove lengthy. Karter served for a time in England before beginning West Point. He graduated with the class of 1947 and served with the Army of Occupation in Germany. There he met his wife, Elizabeth Carmen "Bunt" Whitman, who was serving with the US Defense Department Army Special Services, a USO-like organization. The Elizabeth B. Karter Watch Rock Nature Preserve in Old Lyme is named in honor of Karter's late wife.

Karter also served in Korea, and in Corps of Engineers flood-control projects in the United States. The Army sent him to earn a M.S. in nuclear engineering and physics at Harvard. He was serving as an instructor at West Point when his term of service ended in 1957.

After leaving the Army, Karter worked as a nuclear engineer for American Machine and Foundry, helping build reactors for Pakistan and Iran under the Atoms for Peace program.

== Recycling ==
Karter founded Resource Recovery Systems, Inc. It was one of "the first materials recovery facilities (MRF) in the US."

In the wake of the enthusiasm for recycling that swept the nation following Earth Day (1970), many local governments set up recycling programs that required householders to drive their cans and glass bottles to a recycling depot, sort the glass bottles by color, and throw them into large metal containers. Karter invented and patented industrial processes capable of sorting cans according to their metal content, and of sorting glass into colors and mechanically crushing glass economically.

The technical problem that he overcame was that glass is very abrasive. "Conventional machines at that time were either not sophisticated enough to sort and separate to Karter's satisfaction or wore out too quickly. 'I don't know how many glass breakers we tried. Glass is a very hard material. We finally found a compromise solution: we designed machines so that the working parts could be quickly replaced when they wore out.'"

== Personal life and death ==
He was married to Elizabeth Carmen (née Whitman); they had four daughters: Jean Karter Gulliver (married to John Gulliver); Diana "Dede" Karter Appelbaum (married to Paul S. Appelbaum); Trish Karter; and Liddy Karter Richardson (married to Lex Richardson). His grandsons, Binyamin Appelbaum and Yoni Appelbaum, are both journalists. He and his wife were active members of Episcopalian Church.

Karter was buried in the Duck River Cemetery. Karter explained his motivation this way, "At my age, it is easy enough to think that I will be dead before the environmental crunch comes down on mankind. I keep working because I keep thinking about my grandchildren."
