= The Economists' Hour =

2019 book by Binyamin Appelbaum

The Economists' Hour: False Prophets, Free Markets, and the Fracture of Society
- First edition
- Author: Binyamin Appelbaum
- Audio read by: Dan Bittner
- Language: English
- Subject: Economics
- Genre: Nonfiction
- Publisher: Little, Brown and Company
- Publication date: September 3, 2019
- Publication place: United States
- Media type: Print/digital
- Pages: 448
- ISBN: 978-0316512329
- Website: binyaminappelbaum.com

The Economists' Hour: False Prophets, Free Markets, and the Fracture of Society is a book on the historic ascent of economists in influence, written by Binyamin Appelbaum, a New York Times editorial writer, and published by Little, Brown and Company in September 2019.

== Reception ==
The book was noted by The Economist as journalistic in its approach to the rise of economists involved with public policymaking, by, in example, presenting "the intellectual case" to facilitate twenty years of tax cuts, from the 1960s on, and by helping to engineer two decades of deregulation from the 1970s.

The Economists' Hour was also reviewed by The Boston Globe and The Atlantic, among other publications.

In 2019, the book was named a Wall Street Journal business bestseller and named the Porchlight Business Book Award winner for Narrative and Biography.
