= Daniel Burnap =

American Clock Maker

Daniel Burnap (November 1, 1759 – September 26, 1838) was a clock-maker from Coventry Township (present day Andover), Connecticut. He may have been one of the first to use interchangeable parts and mass production, as his written records imply that he built more than one clock at the same time.

Burnap took on several apprentices during his career. The most notable of his many apprentices was Eli Terry who become the world's largest manufacturer of machine-made clocks and introduced mass production to the art of clockmaking.
