= Binyamin Appelbaum =

American journalist and author

- Born: 1978 or 1979 (age 47–48)
- Other name: Binya Applebaum
- Education: University of Pennsylvania (BA)
- Occupations: Editorial board member, The New York Times
- Known for: Journalist
- Notable work: The Economists' Hour (2019)
- Parent(s): Diana Muir Karter; Paul S. Appelbaum
- Family: Yoni Appelbaum (brother); Peter Karter (grandfather); Trish Karter (aunt)
- Website: www.binyaminappelbaum.com

Binyamin Appelbaum is an American journalist and author. As of 2019, he is the lead writer on business and economics for the editorial board of The New York Times. He was previously a Washington correspondent for the Times, covering the Federal Reserve and other aspects of economic policy, and also had stints writing for The Florida Times-Union, The Charlotte Observer, The Boston Globe and The Washington Post. He graduated in 2001 from the University of Pennsylvania with a B.A. in history. He was an executive editor of the student newspaper, The Daily Pennsylvanian.

== Career ==
In 2007, Appelbaum was part of a team of reporters at The Charlotte Observer who helped shed light on the area's high rate of housing foreclosures and questionable sales practices by Beazer Homes USA, one of the United States' largest homebuilders. A profile of his reporting on the subprime mortgage crisis described how in the early phases of the Great Recession Appelbaum "noticed a strange pattern while compiling a list of foreclosed homes in North Carolina’s Mecklenburg County—clusters were concentrated in new developments. Appelbaum wondered if faulty loans were behind the trend". The Observer′s series led to investigations of Beazer Homes by the FBI, IRS, SEC, and HUD. Beazer Homes has since stopped making mortgage loans nationwide and stopped building homes in Charlotte, North Carolina. Floyd Norris of The New York Times wrote in 2008 how the Observer series likely brought an end to some of Beazer's practices. The series won a Gerald Loeb Award for Medium Newspapers, a George Polk Award and was a finalist for the 2008 Pulitzer Prize in public service.

Appelbaum's November 8, 2018 tweet claiming the term 'gaslighting' was not an "actual English word" sent lookups for the word up 14,000% on Merriam-Webster.com, putting it on their list of trending terms.

== The Economists' Hour ==
Appelbaum's first book, The Economists' Hour, was published in September 2019. According to the publisher's summary, Appelbaum's book "traces the rise of the economists, first in the United States and then around the globe, as their ideas reshaped the modern world, curbing government, unleashing corporations and hastening globalization."

== Personal life ==
He has two siblings including Yoni Appelbaum.
