= Dancing Deer Baking Co. =

New York based bakery

Dancing Deer Baking Co
- Type: Privately held company
- Industry: Bakery
- Founded: 1994 in West Roxbury, Boston, Massachusetts, US
- Founder: Suzanne Lombardi, Ayis Antoniou, and Trish Karter
- Headquarters: Boston, Massachusetts, United States
- Area served: United States and Canada
- Key people: Frank Carpenito, CEO
- Products: Cakes, Cookies, Brownies, Baking Mixes and Gift Baskets
- Number of employees: 75-225 (seasonal)
- Website: dancingdeer.com

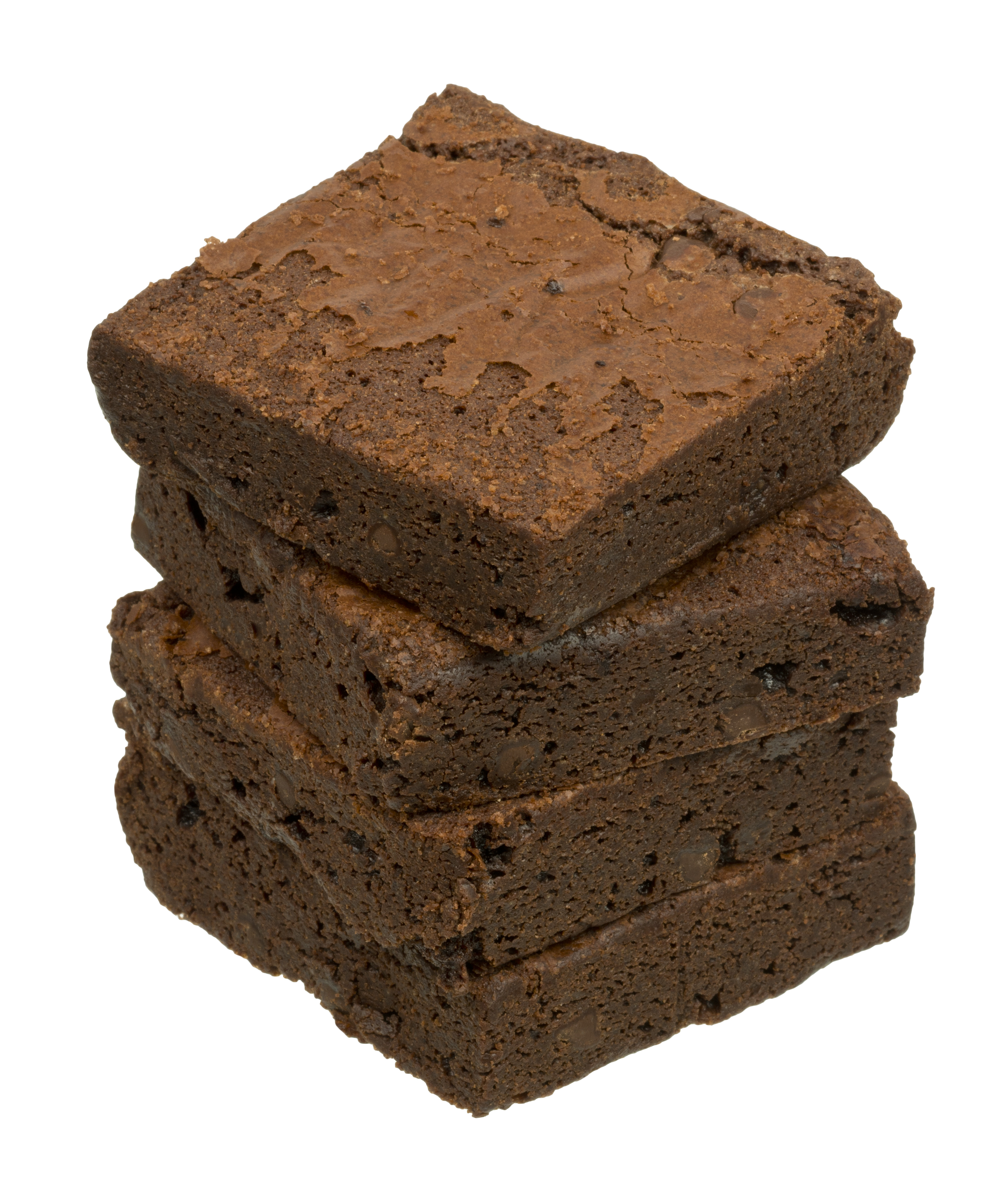
A stack of Dancing Deer brownies

Dancing Deer Baking Co. is a New York based bakery that sells kosher-certified cookies, brownies, cakes and baking mixes in the specialty/natural products, food service/travel/hospitality, business gifts and direct-to-consumer marketplaces. A variety of Dancing Deer products are also available in grocery chains and specialty food stores across the United States and certain parts of Canada, including nationally recognized Whole Foods Market.

The company produces all-natural, preservative-free products.

== History ==
Dancing Deer was incorporated in 1994 by three founders, Suzanne Lombardi, a baker who originated many of Dancing Deer's recipes, Ayis Antoniou, a business strategist and Trish Karter, an artist and businesswoman.

The company started out in a former pizza parlor in West Roxbury, Massachusetts on a busy street corner with a couple of convection ovens. At that time, their specialty was cakes, sold primarily to cafes and restaurants. In 1996, the company released a line of packaged consumer goods under the Dancing Deer label. The company reported revenues of more than $10 million by 2007.

In 2008, the company made a strategic decision to focus on growing the corporate gift portion of the business. Dancing Deer has the ability to print the corporate logos on gift tins and boxes and cookies can be imprinted with corporate logos. Revenues from corporate gifts represented about 15% of annual revenues in 2008 and by late 2008 this was up to over 18%.

In September 2010, Karter stepped down from her role as CEO of the company to pursue a life outside of baking. Nevertheless, in subsequent years, she made several unsuccessful attempts to repurchase the business from its owners, which comprised the private equity firms Ironwood Capital, Generation Equity Capital, and River Hollow Partners. Frank Carpenito became CEO in 2010 and left the position in July 2016.

In 2024, Dancing Deer filed for Chapter 11 bankruptcy.

=== Company name ===
The name for the company came from Lombardi's grandmother, Erma Shaw, who owned a gift shop and antique store named Dancing Deer in Bar Harbor, Maine. The company also borrowed recipes including the famous Deep Dark Gingerbread Cake.

== Awards ==
In 1998, the NASFT or National Association for the Specialty Food Trade awarded Dancing Deer the gold Sofi Award for Outstanding Cookie of the year for their signature Molasses Clove Cookie. Sofi stands for Specialty Outstanding Food Innovation and honors the outstanding specialty foods and beverages of the year in 33 categories.
