= John DePol =

John DePol (September 16, 1913 – December 13, 2004) was a New York print-maker and wood engraver. He was perhaps best known for his illustrations of the Benjamin Franklin keepsakes over a period of over 25 years.

Shows of his art include a one-man show at the Florham-Madison Campus Library in 1997.

== Biography ==
John DePol was born September 16, 1913, in Greenwich Village, New York, where he was raised, the eldest of three children of Theresa and Joseph DePol. His father's death, when John was still a boy, influenced his decision to leave high school early to help support the family — his mother, brother William, and sister Genevieve.

DePol worked as a securities runner on Wall Street and expected that there, beyond this beginning at picking up and delivering certificates of stocks and bonds bought and sold, lay an opportunity to make his fortune. He was employed but four weeks when the stock market crashed during the latter half of October 1929, and only then discovered his fortune merely in holding on to a job at a time when many were losing theirs in the Depression. In the evening DePol attended night school, where he learned typing and shorthand, which were to prove useful for his later stenographic and secretarial positions in civilian and military life - the first of these through a company promotion into a special investments department.

From an early age, guided by his love of art, DePol devoted himself in his spare time to becoming a self-taught artist. He would sketch the streets, landmark buildings and waterfront scenes of Manhattan, and scrutinized gallery windows, studying the etchings of various artists. In 1938 he took a class at the Art Students League of New York where he improved his skills in etching and lithography. Decades later he would recall how he was drawn to the masters.

DePol served in the United States Army Air Force from 1943 to 1945, during this time he was stationed in Belfast, Chipping Ongar, and later France and Germany. He continued to work on his art throughout these years including working on lithographs in the art department of the School of Technology in Belfast and sketching throughout his travels. Much of this would be reflected in later wood engravings.

DePol worked for the Lewis F. White Company after he left the Air Force, and learned typography during this period.

Although John DePol is known as a master of wood engraving, he also produced prints by etching with aquatint and drypoint, as well as lithography. His earliest works were etchings with subjects taken from his life as a young man in New York City. Even these early works, done with almost no professional training, show DePol's sense of design, use of light and shadow, and his abiding interest in the lives of ordinary people. The University of Delaware Library holds the only known collection of DePol's early etchings.

Throughout his life, John DePol returned to the New York City of his birth for inspiration. Many of his earliest artwork was of the lower Manhattan neighborhood he grew up in. Over the years, he continued to make engravings of the buildings, skyline and neighborhoods of the city.
