= Frank Carpenito =

American business executive

Frank Carpenito is the chief executive officer and a former president and CEO of Dancing Deer Baking Company. He has been with the company since 2010, where he had previously been COO. Carpenito's experience has spanned consumer goods companies and entrepreneurship ventures. He is also a turnaround specialist. In April 2013, Carpenito told The Wall Street Journal that he had changed his company's incorporation status to that of a benefit corporation, in order to protect the company from possible shareholder lawsuits against the company's social contributions.

He has a B.S. in management from Boston College.
