= Interchangeable parts =

Practically identical components

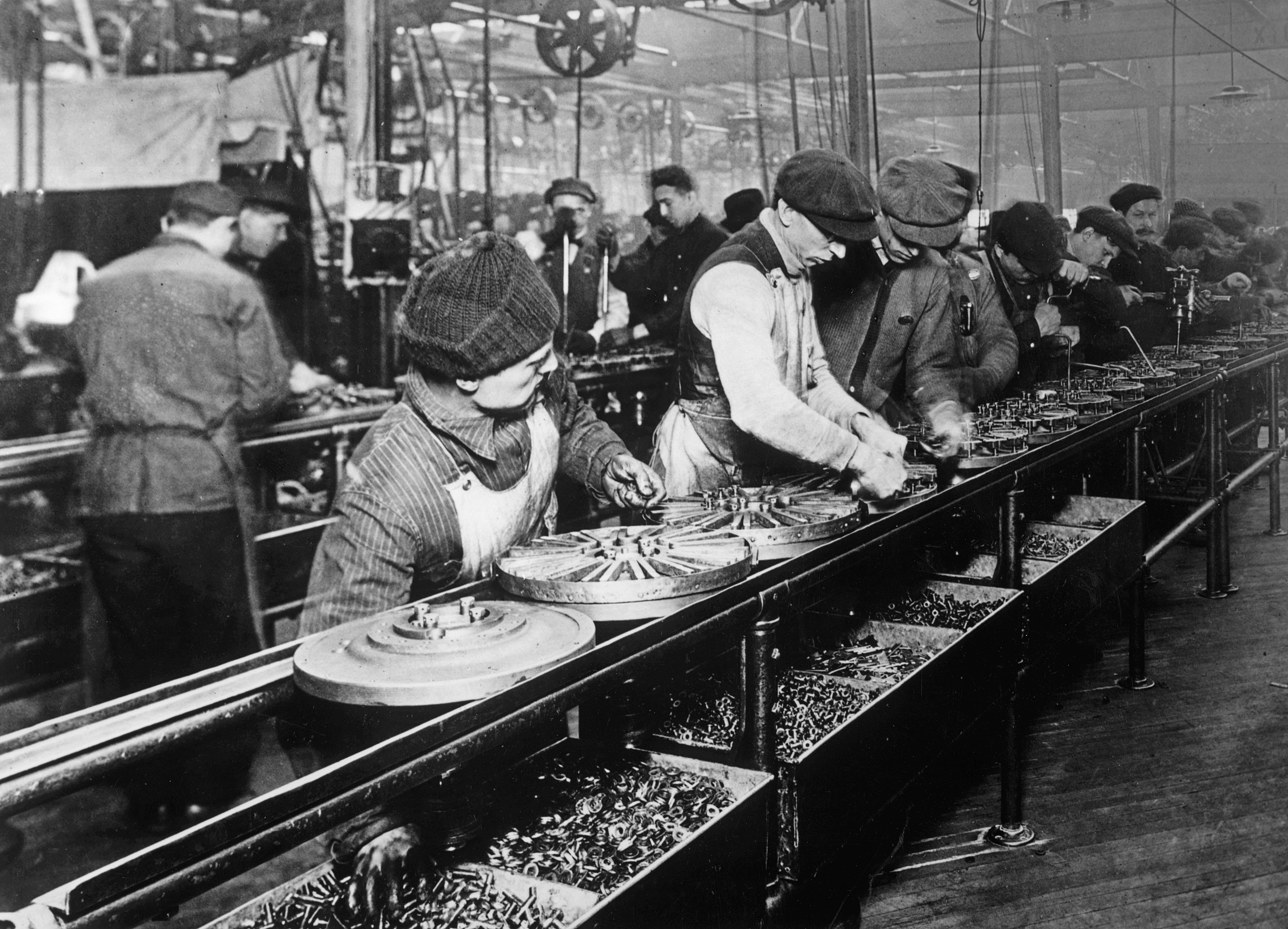
Ford would often use interchangeable parts between car models to save costs, but slowly decreased after it lost market share to Chevrolet.

Interchangeable parts are components that are identical for practical purposes. They are made to specifications that ensure that they are so nearly identical that they will fit into any assembly of the same type. One such part can freely replace another, without any custom fitting, such as filing. This interchangeability allows easy assembly of new devices, and easier repair of existing devices, while minimizing both the time and skill required of the person doing the assembly or repair.

The concept of interchangeability was crucial to the introduction of the assembly line at the beginning of the 20th century, and has become an important element of some modern manufacturing but is missing from other important industries.

Interchangeability of parts was achieved by combining a number of innovations and improvements in machining operations and the invention of several machine tools, such as the slide rest lathe, screw-cutting lathe, turret lathe, milling machine and metal planer. Additional innovations included jigs for guiding the machine tools, fixtures for holding the workpiece in the proper position, and blocks and gauges to check the accuracy of the finished parts. Electrification allowed individual machine tools to be powered by electric motors, eliminating line shaft drives from steam engines or water power and allowing higher speeds, making modern large-scale manufacturing possible. Modern machine tools often have numerical control (NC) which evolved into CNC (computerized numerical control) when microprocessors became available.

Methods for industrial production of interchangeable parts in the United States were first developed in the nineteenth century. The term American system of manufacturing was sometimes applied to them at the time, in distinction from earlier methods. Within a few decades such methods were in use in various countries, so American system is now a term of historical reference rather than current industrial nomenclature.

== First use ==
Evidence of the use of interchangeable parts can be traced back over two thousand years to Carthage in the First Punic War. Carthaginian ships had standardized, interchangeable parts that even came with assembly instructions akin to "tab A into slot B" marked on them.

== Origins of the modern concept ==
In the late-18th century, French General Jean-Baptiste Vaquette de Gribeauval promoted standardized weapons in what became known as the Système Gribeauval after it was issued as a royal order in 1765. (At the time the system focused on artillery more than on muskets or handguns.) One of the accomplishments of the system was that solid-cast cannons were bored to precise tolerances, which allowed the walls to be thinner than cannons poured with hollow cores. However, because cores were often off-center, the wall thickness determined the size of the bore. Standardized boring made for shorter cannons without sacrificing accuracy and range because of the tighter fit of the shells; it also allowed standardization of the shells.

Before the 18th century, devices such as guns were made one at a time by gunsmiths in a unique manner. If one single component of a firearm needed a replacement, the entire firearm either had to be sent to an expert gunsmith for custom repairs, or discarded and replaced by another firearm. During the 18th and early-19th centuries, the idea of replacing these methods with a system of interchangeable manufacture gradually developed. The development took decades and involved many people.

Gribeauval provided patronage to Honoré Blanc, who attempted to implement the Système Gribeauval at the musket level. By around 1778, Honoré Blanc began producing some of the first firearms with interchangeable flintlock mechanisms, although they were carefully made by craftsmen. Blanc demonstrated in front of a committee of scientists that his muskets could be fitted with flintlock mechanisms picked at random from a pile of parts.

In 1785 muskets with interchangeable locks caught the attention of the United States' Ambassador to France, Thomas Jefferson, through the efforts of Honoré Blanc. Jefferson tried unsuccessfully to persuade Blanc to move to America, then wrote to the American Secretary of War with the idea, and when he returned to the USA he worked to fund its development. President George Washington approved of the concept, and in 1798 Eli Whitney signed a contract to mass-produce 12,000 muskets built under the new system.

Between 4 July 1793 and 25 November 1795, the London gunsmith Henry Nock delivered 12,010 'screwless' or 'Duke's' locks to the British Board of Ordnance. These locks were intended to be interchangeable, being manufactured in large volumes in a steam-powered factory using gauges and lathes by a workforce combining salaried employees and piece workers. Subsequent experiments have suggested that the lock's components were interchangeable at a higher rate than those of the later British New Land Pattern musket and the American M1816 musket.

Louis de Tousard, who fled the French Revolution, joined the U.S. Corp of Artillerists in 1795 and wrote an influential artillerist's manual that stressed the importance of standardization.

== Implementation ==
Numerous inventors began to try to implement the principle Blanc had described. The development of the machine tools and manufacturing practices required would be a great expense to the U.S. Ordnance Department, and for some years while trying to achieve interchangeability, the firearms produced cost more to manufacture. By 1853, there was evidence that interchangeable parts, then perfected by the Federal Armories, led to savings. The Ordnance Department freely shared the techniques used with outside suppliers.

=== Eli Whitney and an early attempt ===
In the US, Eli Whitney saw the potential benefit of developing "interchangeable parts" for the firearms of the United States military. In July 1801 he built ten guns, all containing the same exact parts and mechanisms, then disassembled them before the United States Congress. He placed the parts in a mixed pile and, with help, reassembled all of the firearms in front of Congress, much as Blanc had done some years before.

The Congress was captivated and ordered a standard for all United States equipment. The use of interchangeable parts removed the problems of earlier eras concerning the difficulty or impossibility of producing new parts for old equipment. If one firearm part failed, another could be ordered, and the firearm would not need to be discarded. The catch was that Whitney's guns were costly and handmade by skilled workmen.

Charles Fitch credited Whitney with successfully executing a firearms contract with interchangeable parts using the American System, but historians Merritt Roe Smith and Robert B. Gordon have since determined that Whitney never actually achieved interchangeable parts manufacturing. His family's arms company, however, did so after his death.

=== Brunel's sailing blocks ===
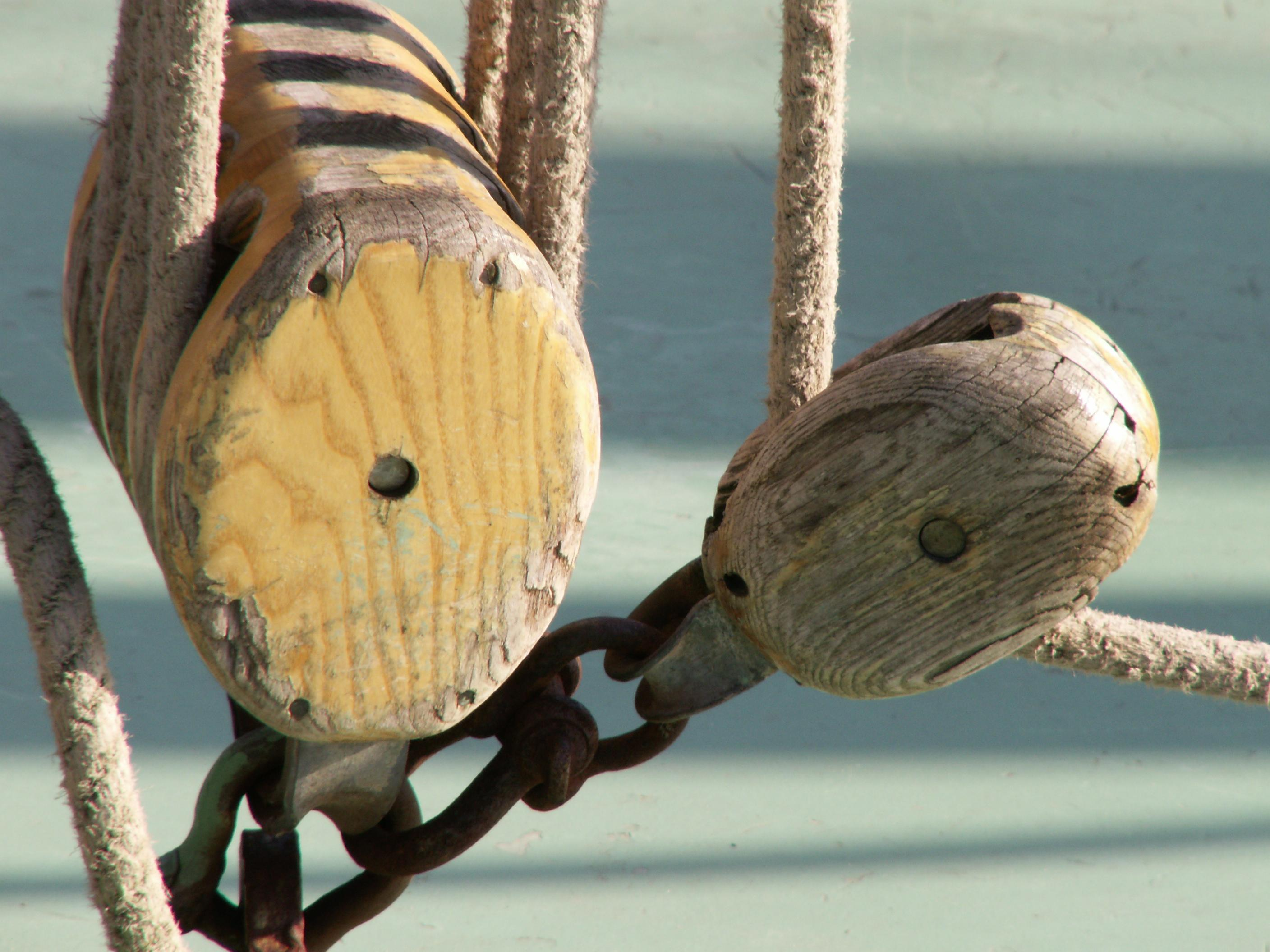
A pulley block for rigging on a sailing ship

Mass production using interchangeable parts was first achieved in 1803 by Marc Isambard Brunel in cooperation with Henry Maudslay and Simon Goodrich, under the management of (and with contributions by) Brigadier-General Sir Samuel Bentham, the Inspector General of Naval Works at Portsmouth Block Mills, Portsmouth Dockyard, Hampshire, England. At the time, the Napoleonic War was at its height, and the Royal Navy was in a state of expansion that required 100,000 pulley blocks to be manufactured a year. Bentham had already achieved remarkable efficiency at the docks by introducing power-driven machinery and reorganising the dockyard system.

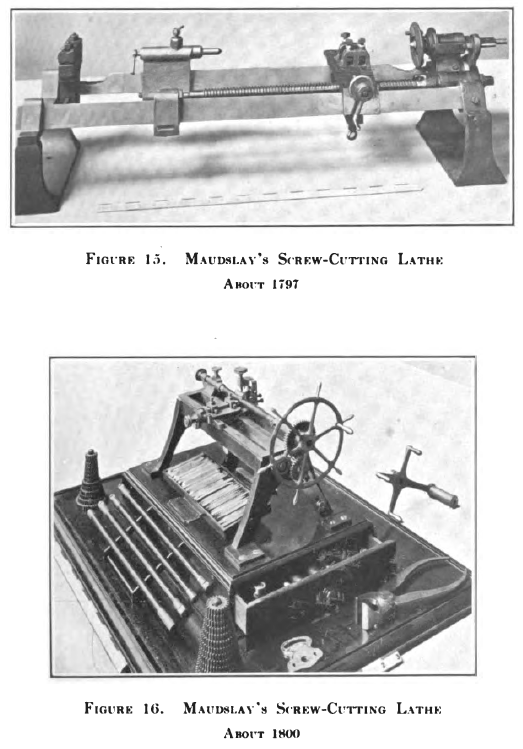
Henry Maudslay's screw-cutting lathes (c. 1800) permitted the large-scale, industrial production of screws that were interchangeable.

Marc Brunel, a pioneering engineer, and Maudslay, a founding father of machine tool technology who had developed the first industrially practical screw-cutting lathe in 1800 which standardized screw thread sizes for the first time, collaborated on plans to manufacture block-making machinery; the proposal was submitted to the Admiralty who agreed to commission his services. By 1805, the dockyard had been fully updated with the revolutionary, purpose-built machinery at a time when products were still built individually with different components. A total of 45 machines were required to perform 22 processes on the blocks, which could be made in three different sizes. The machines were almost entirely made of metal, thus improving their accuracy and durability. The machines would make markings and indentations on the blocks to ensure alignment throughout the process. One of the many advantages of this new method was the increase in labour productivity due to the less labour-intensive requirements of managing the machinery. Richard Beamish, assistant to Brunel's son and engineer, Isambard Kingdom Brunel, wrote:

So that ten men, by the aid of this machinery, can accomplish with uniformity, celerity and ease, what formerly required the uncertain labour of one hundred and ten.

By 1808, annual production had reached 130,000 blocks and some of the equipment was still in operation as late as the mid-twentieth century.

=== Terry's clocks: success in wood ===
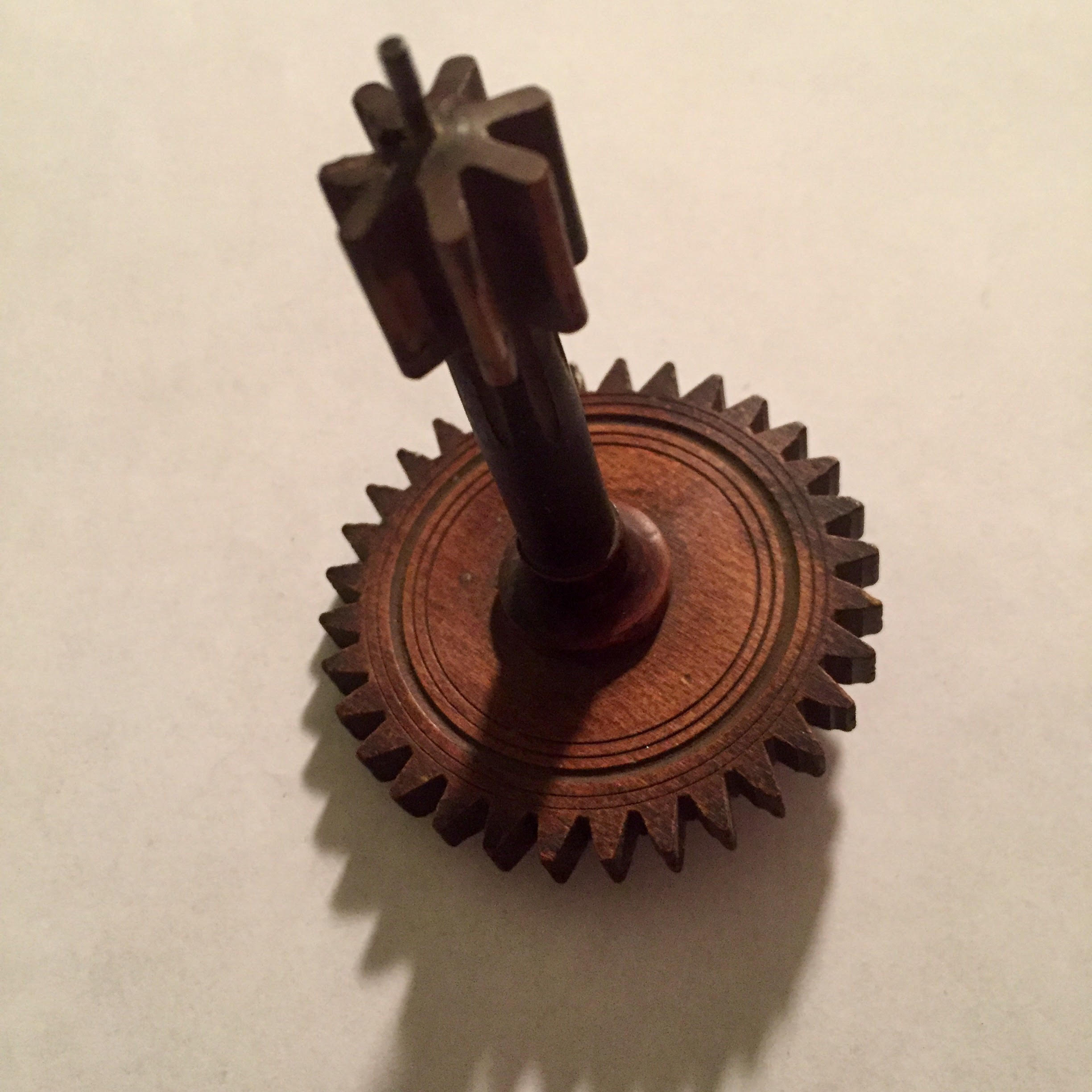
A wooden gear from one of Terry's tall case clocks, showing the use of milled teeth

Eli Terry was using interchangeable parts using a milling machine as early as 1800. Ward Francillon, a horologist, concluded in a study that Terry had already accomplished interchangeable parts as early as 1800. The study examined several of Terry's clocks produced between 1800–1807. The parts were labelled and interchanged as needed. The study concluded that all clock pieces were interchangeable. The very first mass production using interchangeable parts in America was Eli Terry's 1806 Porter Contract, which called for the production of 4000 clocks in three years. During this contract, Terry crafted four-thousand wooden gear tall case movements, at a time when the annual average was about a dozen. Unlike Eli Whitney, Terry manufactured his products without government funding. Terry saw the potential of clocks becoming a household object. With the use of a milling machine, Terry was able to mass-produce clock wheels and plates a few dozen at the same time. Jigs and templates were used to make uniform pinions, so that all parts could be assembled using an assembly line.

=== North and Hall: success in metal ===
The crucial step toward interchangeability in metal parts was taken by Simeon North, working only a few miles from Eli Terry. North created one of the world's first true milling machines to do metal shaping that had been done by hand with a file. Diana Muir believes that North's milling machine was online around 1816. Muir, Merritt Roe Smith, and Robert B. Gordon all agree that before 1832 both Simeon North and John Hall were able to mass-produce complex machines with moving parts (guns) using a system that entailed the use of rough-forged parts, with a milling machine that milled the parts to near-correct size, and that were then "filed to gage by hand with the aid of filing jigs."

Historians differ over the question of whether Hall or North made the crucial improvement. Merrit Roe Smith believes that it was done by Hall. Muir demonstrates the close personal ties and professional alliances between Simeon North and neighbouring mechanics mass-producing wooden clocks to argue that the process for manufacturing guns with interchangeable parts was most probably devised by North in emulation of the successful methods used in mass-producing clocks. It may not be possible to resolve the question with absolute certainty unless documents now unknown should surface in the future.

=== Joseph Whitworth and screw thread standardisation ===
While early pioneers focused on mass-producing components like gun locks and clock gears, true mechanical interchangeability remained severely constrained by a lack of uniformity in fastening components. In the early 19th century, individual manufacturers used their own proprietary in-house threads, meaning bolts and nuts made by one maker would rarely fit those made by another.

In 1841, English engineer and inventor Sir Joseph Whitworth revolutionised precision manufacturing by devising the world's first national screw thread standard, known as the British Standard Whitworth (BSW). Whitworth collected sample bolts from workshops across Great Britain and calculated an average compromise for thread pitch, depth and a standardised 55-degree thread angle with rounded roots and crests.

Whitworth's standard removed a major bottleneck to interchangeable manufacturing by ensuring that screws, bolts and nuts produced by different machine shops could fit together seamlessly. The practical value of this standardisation was demonstrated during the Crimean War when marine engineer John Penn took a pair of standardised engine designs, distributed parts production across various machine shops and successfully assembled ninety 60-horsepower marine engines in just ninety days, a feat previously deemed impossible.

Beyond screw threads, Whitworth advanced the prerequisites of interchangeable parts: true flatness, precision measurement and high-accuracy machine tools. He developed ultra-precise measuring machines capable of detecting differences down to one-millionth of an inch, along with superior slide-rest lathes and planing machines. By establishing rigorous standards for measurement and geometric accuracy, Whitworth's work helped transition mechanical engineering from a craft reliant on custom-fitting and filing into a standardised, mass-production industry.

=== Late 19th and early 20th centuries: dissemination throughout manufacturing ===
Skilled engineers and machinists, many with armoury experience, spread interchangeable manufacturing techniques to other American industries, including clockmakers and sewing machine manufacturers Wilcox and Gibbs and Wheeler and Wilson, who used interchangeable parts before 1860. Late to adopt the interchangeable system were Singer Corporation sewing machine (1860s-70s), reaper manufacturer McCormick Harvesting Machine Company (1870s–1880s) and several large steam engine manufacturers such as Corliss (mid-1880s) as well as locomotive makers. Typewriters followed some years later. Then large scale production of bicycles in the 1880s began to use the interchangeable system.

During these decades, true interchangeability grew from a scarce and difficult achievement into an everyday capability throughout the manufacturing industries. In the 1950s and 1960s, historians of technology broadened the world's understanding of the history of the development. Few people outside that academic discipline knew much about the topic until as recently as the 1980s and 1990s, when the academic knowledge began finding wider audiences. As recently as the 1960s, when Alfred P. Sloan published his famous memoir and management treatise, My Years with General Motors, even the long-time president and chair of the largest manufacturing enterprise that had ever existed knew very little about the history of the development, other than to say that:

[Henry M. Leland was], I believe, one of those mainly responsible for bringing the technique of interchangeable parts into automobile manufacturing. […] It has been called to my attention that Eli Whitney, long before, had started the development of interchangeable parts in connection with the manufacture of guns, a fact which suggests a line of descent from Whitney to Leland to the automobile industry.

One of the better-known books on the subject, which was first published in 1984 and has enjoyed a readership beyond academia, has been David A. Hounshell's From the American System to Mass Production, 1800–1932: The Development of Manufacturing Technology in the United States.

== See also ==
- Allowance (engineering)
- Configuration management
- Engineering fit
- Engineering tolerance
- Fungibility
- Just-in-time (business)
- Louis de Tousard
- Modular design
- Preferred numbers
- Parts pairing

== Bibliography ==
- Cantrell, J.; Cookson, G., eds. (2002), Henry Maudslay and the Pioneers of the Machine Age, Stroud.
- Coad, Jonathan (1989), The Royal Dockyards, 1690–1850, Aldershot.
- Coad, Jonathan (2005), The Portsmouth Block Mills: Bentham, Brunel and the start of the Royal Navy's Industrial Revolution, English Heritage, ISBN 1-873592-87-6.
- Cooper, C. C. (1982), "The production line at Portsmouth block mill", Industrial Archaeology Review, VI: 28–44.
- Cooper, C. C. (1984), "The Portsmouth system of manufacture", Technology and Culture, 25 (2): 182–225, doi:10.2307/3104712, JSTOR 3104712, S2CID 111936139.
- Fitch, Charles H. (1882), Extra Census Bulletin. Report on the manufacture of fire-arms and ammunition, Washington, DC, USA: United States Government Printing Office.
- French, Thomas E.; Vierck, Charles J.; et al. (1953), A manual of engineering drawing for students and draftsmen (8th ed.), New York, New York, USA: McGraw-Hill, LCCN 52013455.
- Gilbert, K. R. (1965), The Portsmouth block-making machinery, London, UK: Her Majesty’s Stationery Office.
- Gordon, Robert B. (1989), "Simeon North, John Hall, and mechanized manufacturing", Technology and Culture, 30 (1): 179–188, doi:10.2307/3105469, JSTOR 3105469, S2CID 111632820.
- Hounshell, David A. (1984), From the American System to Mass Production, 1800–1932: The Development of Manufacturing Technology in the United States, Baltimore, Maryland: Johns Hopkins University Press, ISBN 978-0-8018-2975-8, LCCN 83016269, OCLC 1104810110 Traces in detail the ideal of interchangeable parts, from its origins in 18th-century France, through the gradual development of its practical application via the armory practice ("American system") of the 19th century, to its apex in true mass production beginning in the early 20th century.
- Muir, Diana (2000), Reflections in Bullough's Pond: Economy and Ecosystem in New England, University Press of New England, ISBN 978-0-87451-909-9.
- Sloan, Alfred P. (1964), McDonald, John (ed.), My Years with General Motors, Garden City, NY, US: Doubleday, LCCN 64011306, OCLC 802024. Republished in 1990 with a new introduction by Peter Drucker (ISBN 978-0385042352).
- Roe, Joseph Wickham (1916), English and American Tool Builders, New Haven, Connecticut: Yale University Press, LCCN 16011753. Reprinted by McGraw-Hill, New York and London, 1926 (LCCN 27-24075); and by Lindsay Publications, Inc., Bradley, Illinois (ISBN 978-0-917914-73-7). A seminal classic of machine tool history. Extensively cited by later works.
- Smith, Merritt Roe (October 1973), "John Hall, Simeon North and the Milling Machine", Technology and Culture, 14 (4): 573–591, doi:10.2307/3102444, JSTOR 3102444, S2CID 111427243.
- Smith, Merritt Roe (1977), Harper's Ferry Armory and the New Technology, Cornell University Press.
- Van Dusen, Albert E. (2003). "Eli Whitney". Laptop Encyclopedia of Connecticut History. CTHeritage.org..
- Wilkin, Susan (1999), The application of emerging new technologies by Portsmouth Dockyard, 1790–1815 [PhD Thesis], The Open University. (Copies available from the British Thesis service of the British Library).
