= Reflections in Bullough's Pond =

2000 book by Diana Muir

Reflections in Bullough's Pond; Economy and Ecosystem in New England
- Author: Diana Muir
- Language: English
- Subject: Environmentalism; history; New England
- Publisher: University Press of New England
- Publication date: 2000
- Publication place: United States
- Media type: Hardcover/paperback
- Pages: 312
- ISBN: 0-87451-909-8
- OCLC: 42866181
- Dewey Decimal: 330.974 21
- LC Class: HC107.A11 M84 2000

Reflections in Bullough's Pond: Economy and Ecosystem in New England is a book by Diana Muir, published in 2000. Providence Journal called Bullough’s Pond "a masterpiece", and Publishers Weekly called it "lyrical". The Massachusetts Center for the Book awarded it the 2001 Massachusetts Book Award, for the author's "engaging and accomplished storytelling".

== Thesis ==
Muir makes a complex, Malthusian argument for the origin of an industrial revolution in New England independent of the English industrial revolution. Demonstrating that the economic model of colonial New England was large families of children on small-hold farms, producing sufficient wealth not only to live comfortably but to enable all of the children to purchase farms, she argues that a crunch point was reached when cheap, unsettled land ceased to be available. Focusing on the decades following 1790, she argues that families had accumulated wealth to set their children up on farms, but that land was not available until after the federal government broke the armed strength of Tecumseh in the Ohio country. During that twenty-year period, she demonstrates the development of numerous innovative techniques in the early stages of Interchangeable parts manufacturing and precision tool manufacturing, the aspects of industrialization in which southern New England was to lead the world.

Muir argues that, "The Agricultural Revolution saved hunters and gatherers from starving after they wiped out their bigger prey and populations grew too big to be supported by remaining food supplies. The Industrial Revolution saved the Yankees from poverty, but it depended on fossil energy, the by-products of which are polluting the earth. Muir thus argues that a Third Revolution is now necessary, one that will entail the discovery and deployment of new kinds of energy and materials."

=== Interchangeable parts ===
Muir's most innovative argument is her tracing of the origins of Mass production manufacturing using Interchangeable parts to Eli Terry and the early Connecticut clock industry. She outlines a chain of transmission from Terry's mass production of wooden clockworks, through clockmaker Elisha Cheney to Simeon North, early mass-production gunmaker and inventor of the earliest milling machine capable of working metal.

== Pre-contact New England ==
Muir’s treatment of Native Americans follows William Cronon’s understanding of native cultures as agents of change who interacted with the ecosystems they inhabited in complex ways. Her innovation here is the use of archaeological data to argue that the Iroquois expansion onto Algonquian lands was checked by the Algonquian adoption of agriculture enabling them to support populations large enough to include a body of warriors that could hold back the threat of Iroquois conquest.

== Economic history ==
“With New England as the frame of her loom, Diana Muir has used a single shuttle--the dynamic of increasing human population and finite natural resources --to weave the economic and environmental stories of the past four centuries in this corner of North America. Reflections in Bullough's Pond: Economy and Ecosystem in New England suggests that the region has, repeatedly, reached and then exceeded the population that could be sustained by then-current economic subsistence strategies. It illuminates how New Englanders, from indigenous inhabitants to contemporary denizens, have answered the population-resource dilemma and, in doing so, generated both intentional outcomes and unintended – and potent – consequences.” Individual sections are devoted to farming, and to the machine tool and papermaking industries.

== Prizes and awards ==
For Reflections in Bullough's Pond (University Press of New England, 2000)

- Massachusetts Book Award, 2001

== Reading guide ==
- Massachusetts Center for the Book: A Reading and Discussion Guide
