= Diana Muir Appelbaum =

American historian and writer

- Born: Diana Karter
- Occupations: Author, historian
- Spouse: Paul S. Appelbaum
- Children: 3, including Yoni and Binyamin
- Parent(s): Elizabeth Whitman Karter; Peter Karter
- Family: Trish Karter (sister)
- Website: dianamuirappelbaum.com

Diana Muir, also known as Diana Muir Appelbaum, is an American historian from Newton, Massachusetts, best known for her 2000 book, Reflections in Bullough's Pond, a history of the impact of human activity on the New England ecosystem.

== Personal life ==
Appelbaum was born at Fort Belvoir, Virginia. Her father was in the army, and the family lived in several states before settling in the small town of Old Lyme, Connecticut, when she was entering eleventh grade. She won an AFS Intercultural Programs scholarship and spent a year in Llay-Llay, Chile, before graduating from Old Lyme High School. She attended Barnard College in New York City. Her parents are Elizabeth Carmen (née Whitman) and the nuclear engineer Peter Karter (né Patayonis Karteroulis). Her paternal grandparents were Greek. Her sister is the entrepreneur Trish Karter. She is married to Paul S. Appelbaum, a psychiatrist and professor at Columbia University with whom she has co-authored articles. They have three adult children, including Binyamin and Yoni Appelbaum.

== Environmentalism ==
Muir, an environmental historian, is a critic of what she calls the American choice of "profitability over sustainability". She has been called "Malthusian" and a "shameless environmentalist". She has written a column for the Massachusetts Sierran, the magazine of the Massachusetts Sierra Club.

== Works ==
Muir is the author of histories of Thanksgiving (1985) and the Fourth of July (1989). The sociologist Amitai Etzioni has called Muir's books key works in the social history of holidays.

She has also authored two picture books for children, Giants in the Land (1993) and Cocoa Ice (1997).

Reflections in Bullough's Pond

According to the Daily News Tribune, "Muir's 2000 book Reflections in Bullough's Pond reads more like a novel than a history book. In the book, Muir shows the historical relationship between New England's economy and the environment. She expands the relationship into a national and global analysis of America's, and the world's, current environmental and political problems: global warming, ozone depletion, and Middle East oil dependence, to name a few. Muir claims America's oil dependent economy has hit a dead end. Muir argues that Americans can, and must, make economic changes to alleviate their environmental and political problems."

Muir draws on many academic disciplines in her work. As the Boston Globe put it:

She's an economist. Then, again, maybe she's really an ecologist. Although some book critics and readers consider her a New England historian. Actually, Newton author Diana Muir is probably all of the above... Although her book was well received by economic historians who like to look at how industries rise and fall, Muir doesn't call herself a lay economist. "I'm an historian," she said. "And it seems to me that any intelligent person has to enjoy nature and care about the environment, and so those interests all came together."

She has published a number of articles on genetics and ethnicity, defending the position that ethnicity is a matter of language and customs, not genetic descent.

== Selected publications ==
=== Books ===
- Thanksgiving: an American Holiday (1985)
- The Glorious Fourth: An American Holiday (1989)
- Reflections in Bullough's Pond: Economy and Ecosystem in New England (2000)

=== Books for children ===
- Giants in the Land (1993)
- Cocoa Ice (1997)

=== Articles ===
- "The Gene Wars", with Paul S. Appelbaum, Azure, Winter 5767 / 2007, No. 27
- "A Land without a People for a People without a Land", Middle Eastern Quarterly, Spring 2008, vol. 15, no. 2
- "The Rootless Roma". The American Interest. 6 (4). March 1, 2011.
- "Jewish Identity and Egyptian Revival Architecture", Journal of Jewish Identities, summer 2012
- "Biblical nationalism and the sixteenth-century states". National Identities. 15 (4). Informa UK: 317–332. 2013. Bibcode:2013NatId..15..317A. doi:10.1080/14608944.2013.814624. ISSN 1460-8944. S2CID 144096460.
