= Trish Karter =

American businessman

Trish Karter is an American entrepreneur and the founder of the Dancing Deer Baking Co.

== Early life and education ==
Karter is a graduate of Lyme-Old Lyme High School, Wheaton College, and the Yale School of Management.

She is the daughter of Peter Karter, a pioneer of the modern materials recycling industry. Karter lives in Milton, Massachusetts and is the mother of two children, Dimitri and Eleanna Antoniou.

== Career ==
Karter was the founder and CEO of the Dancing Deer Baking Company, a Boston-based producer of high-end, natural baked goods for nationwide distribution. The company is known for its commitment to employing and providing opportunity to individuals from deprived backgrounds.

The company is noted for producing all-natural, preservative-free products.

Karter is also an artist; part of the success of the Dancing Deer line of baked goods is credited to the "whimsical" figures that she has created to decorate the company's packaging.
