= Plymouth Historic District =

Plymouth Historic District may refer to:

in the United States

(by state then city)

- East Plymouth Historic District, Plymouth, Connecticut, listed on the National Register of Historic Places (NRHP)
- Plymouth Center Historic District, Plymouth, Connecticut, NRHP-listed
- Plymouth Downtown Historic District, Plymouth, Indiana, NRHP-listed
- Plymouth Southside Historic District, Plymouth, Indiana, NRHP-listed
- Plymouth Village Historic District, Plymouth, Massachusetts, NRHP-listed
- Plymouth (Columbus, Mississippi), listed on the NRHP in Lowndes County
- Plymouth Historic District (Plymouth, New Hampshire), NRHP-listed
- Plymouth Historic District (Plymouth, North Carolina), NRHP-listed
- Plymouth Historic District (Plymouth, Ohio), listed on the NRHP in Huron County, Ohio, and also in Richland County, Ohio
- Plymouth Meeting Historic District, Plymouth Meeting, Pennsylvania, NRHP-listed
- Plymouth Historic District (Plymouth, Vermont), NRHP-listed
- Downtown Plymouth Historic District in Plymouth, Wisconsin
