= Mass production =

High volume production of standardized products

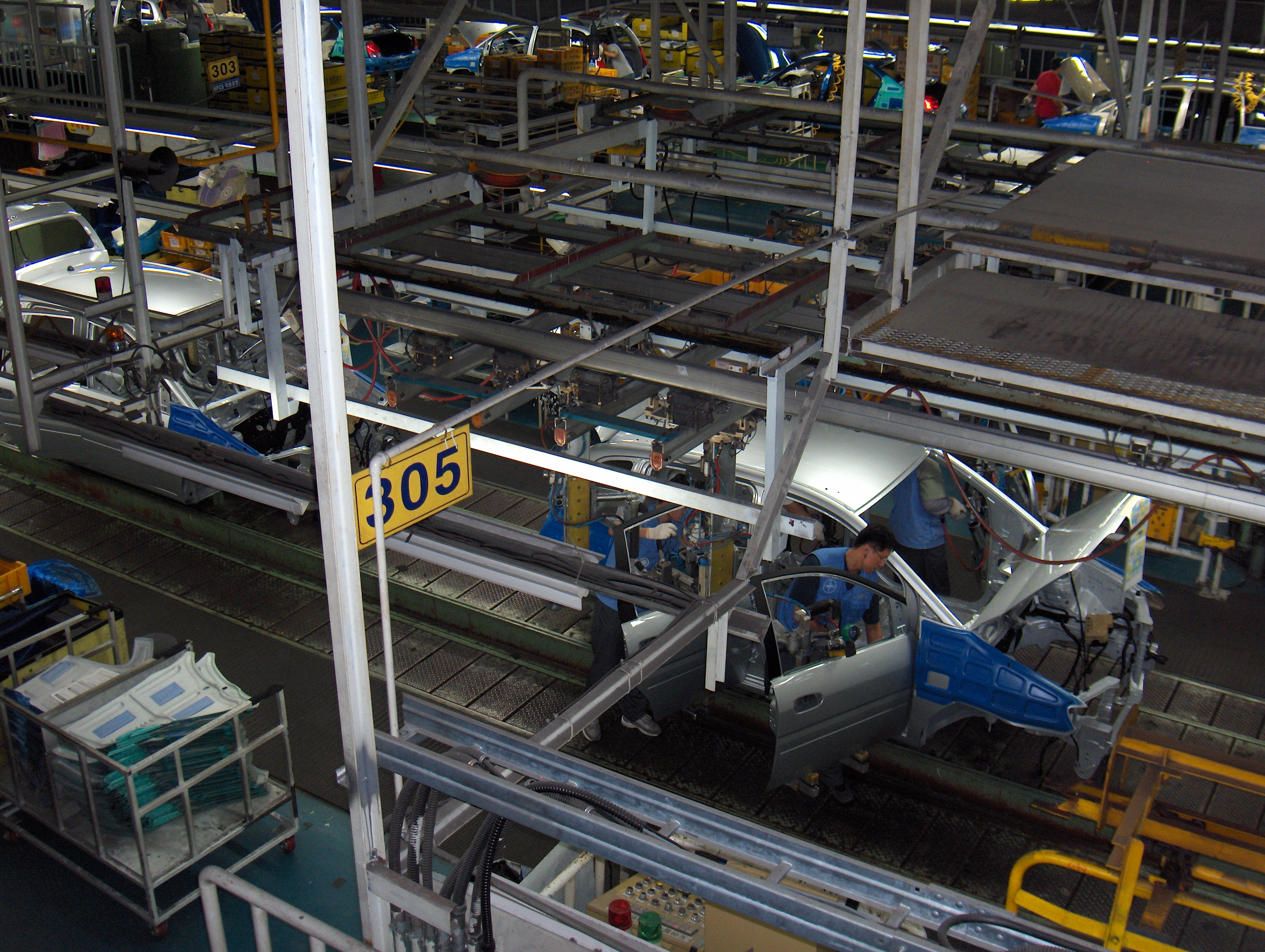
A modern automobile assembly line

Mass production, also known as series production, series manufacture, or continuous production, is the production of substantial amounts of standardized products in a constant flow, including and especially on assembly lines. Together with job production and batch production, it is one of the three main production methods.

The term mass production was popularized by a 1926 article in the Encyclopædia Britannica supplement that was written based on correspondence with Ford Motor Company. The New York Times used the term in the title of an article that appeared before the publication of the Britannica article.

The idea of mass production is applied to many kinds of products: from fluids and particulates handled in bulk (food, fuel, chemicals and mined minerals), to clothing, textiles, parts and assemblies of parts (household appliances and automobiles).

Some mass production techniques, such as standardized sizes and production lines, predate the Industrial Revolution by many centuries; however, it was not until the introduction of machine tools and techniques to produce interchangeable parts were developed in the mid-19th century that modern mass production was possible.

== Overview ==
Mass production involves making many copies of products (Mainly done through machines), very quickly, using assembly line techniques to send partially complete products to workers who each work on an individual step, rather than having a worker work on a whole product from start to finish. The emergence of mass production allowed supply to outstrip demand in many markets, forcing companies to seek new ways to become more competitive. Mass production ties into the idea of overconsumption and the idea that we as humans consume too much.

Mass production of fluid matter typically involves piping with centrifugal pumps or screw conveyors (augers) to transfer raw materials or partially complete products between vessels. Fluid flow processes such as oil refining and bulk materials such as wood chips and pulp are automated using a system of process control which uses various instruments to measure variables such as temperature, pressure, volumetric and level, providing feedback.

Bulk materials such as coal, ores, grains and wood chips are handled by belt, chain, slat, pneumatic or screw conveyors, bucket elevators and mobile equipment such as front-end loaders. Materials on pallets are handled with forklifts. Also used for handling heavy items like reels of paper, steel or machinery are electric overhead cranes, sometimes called bridge cranes because they span large factory bays.

Mass production is capital-intensive and energy-intensive, for it uses a high proportion of machinery and energy in relation to workers. It is also usually automated while total expenditure per unit of product is decreased. However, the machinery that is needed to set up a mass production line (such as robots and machine presses) is so expensive that in order to attain profits there must be some assurance that the product will be successful.

One of the descriptions of mass production is that "the skill is built into the tool", which means that the worker using the tool may not need the skill. For example, in the 19th or early 20th century, this could be expressed as "the craftsmanship is in the workbench itself" (not the training of the worker). Rather than having a skilled worker measure every dimension of each part of the product against the plans or the other parts as it is being formed, there were jigs ready at hand to ensure that the part was made to fit this set-up. It had already been checked that the finished part would be to specifications to fit all the other finished parts—and it would be made more quickly, with no time spent on finishing the parts to fit one another. Later, once computerized control came about (for example, CNC), jigs were obviated, but it remained true that the skill (or knowledge) was built into the tool (or process, or documentation) rather than residing in the worker's head. This is the specialized capital required for mass production; each workbench and set of tools (or each CNC cell, or each fractionating column) is different (fine-tuned to its task).

== History ==
=== Pre-industrial ===
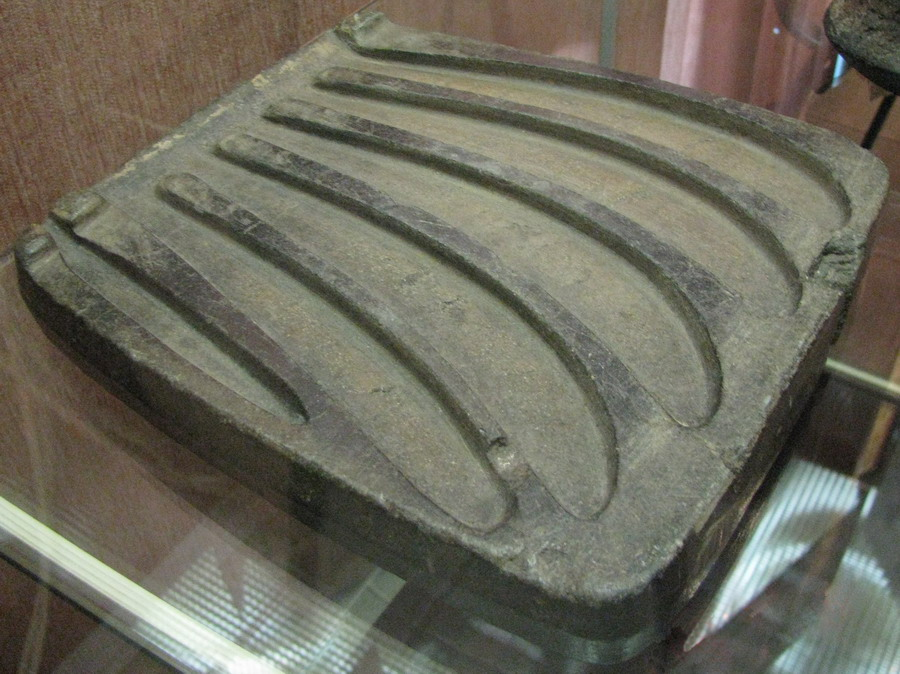
Sometimes production in series has obvious benefits, as is the case with this 5-sickle casting mould from the Bronze Age on show at a museum in Yekaterinburg, Russia.

This woodcut from 1568 shows the left printer removing a page from the press while the one at the right inks the text blocks. Such a duo could reach 14,000 hand movements per working day, printing around 3,600 pages in the process.

Standardized parts and sizes and factory production techniques were developed in pre-industrial times; before the invention of machine tools the manufacture of precision parts, especially metal ones, was highly labour-intensive.

Crossbows made with bronze parts were produced in China during the Warring States period. The Qin Emperor unified China at least in part by equipping large armies with these weapons, which were fitted with a sophisticated trigger mechanism made of interchangeable parts. The Terracotta Army guarding the Emperor's tomb is also believed to have been created through the use of standardized molds on an assembly line.

In ancient Carthage, ships of war were mass-produced on a large scale at a moderate cost, allowing them to efficiently maintain their control of the Mediterranean. Many centuries later, the Republic of Venice would follow Carthage in producing ships with prefabricated parts on an assembly line: the Venetian Arsenal produced nearly one ship every day in what was effectively the world's first factory, which at its height employed 16,000 people.

The invention of movable type has allowed for documents such as books to be mass produced. The first movable type system was invented in China by Bi Sheng, during the reign of the Song dynasty, where it was used to, among other things, issue paper money. The oldest extant book produced using metal type is Jikji, printed in Korea in the year 1377. Johannes Gutenberg, through his invention of the printing press and production of the Gutenberg Bible, introduced movable type to Europe. Through this introduction, mass production in the European publishing industry was made commonplace, leading to a democratization of knowledge, increased literacy and education, and the beginnings of modern science.

French artillery engineer Jean-Baptiste de Gribeauval introduced the standardization of cannon design in the late 18th century. He streamlined production and management of cannonballs and cannons by limiting them to only three calibers, and he improved their effectiveness by requiring more spherical ammunition. Redesigning these weapons to use interchangeable wheels, screws, and axles simplified mass production and repair.

=== Industrial ===
In the Industrial Revolution, simple mass production techniques were used at the Portsmouth Block Mills in England to make ships' pulley blocks for the Royal Navy in the Napoleonic Wars. It was achieved in 1803 by Marc Isambard Brunel in cooperation with Henry Maudslay under the management of Sir Samuel Bentham. The first unmistakable examples of manufacturing operations carefully designed to reduce production costs by specialized labour and the use of machines appeared in the 18th century in England.

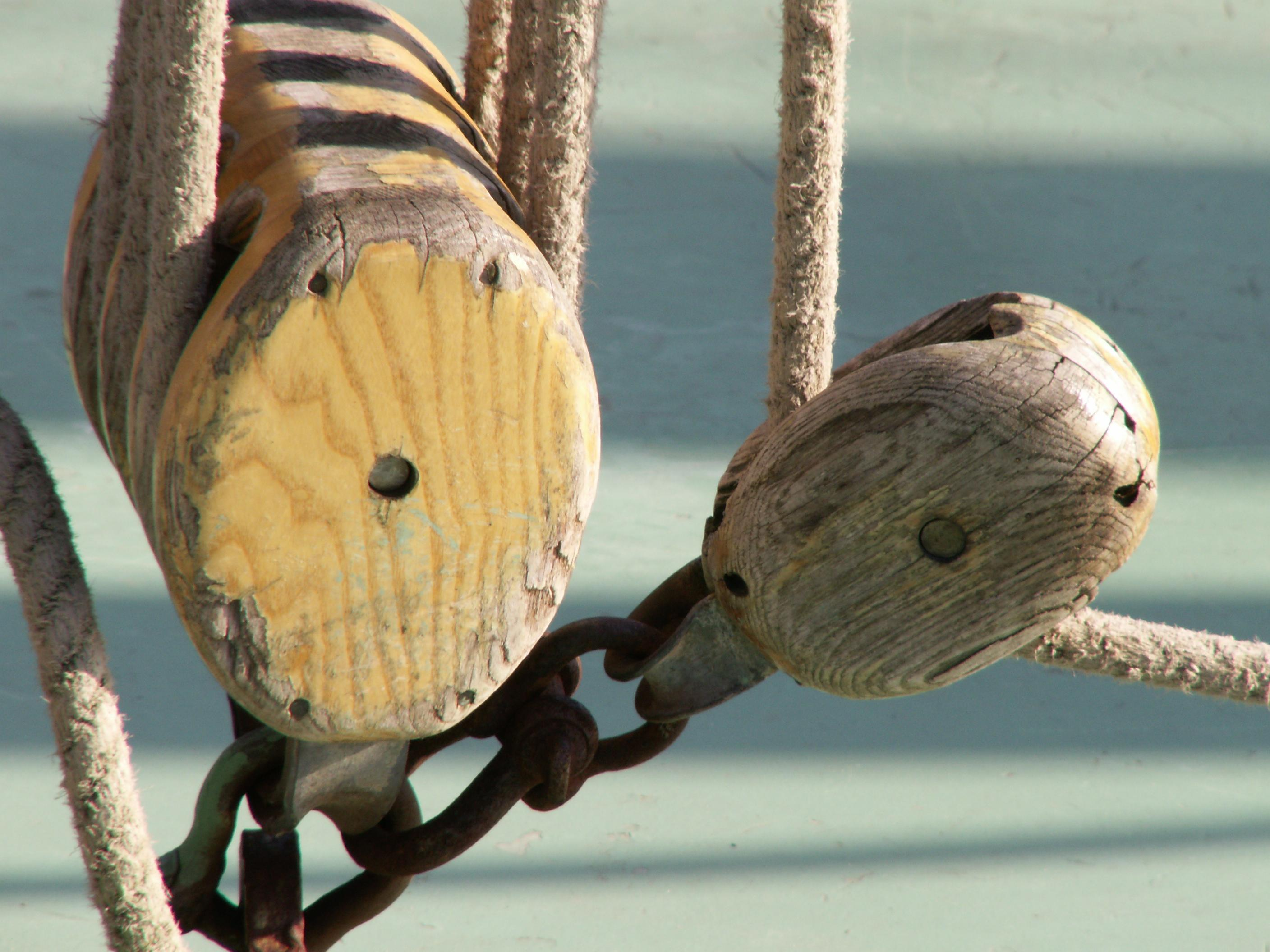
A pulley block for rigging on a sailing ship. By 1808, annual production in Portsmouth reached 130,000 blocks.

The Navy was in a state of expansion that required 100,000 pulley blocks to be manufactured a year. Bentham had already achieved remarkable efficiency at the docks by introducing power-driven machinery and reorganising the dockyard system. Brunel, a pioneering engineer, and Maudslay, a pioneer of machine tool technology who had developed the first industrially practical screw-cutting lathe in 1800 which standardized screw thread sizes for the first time which in turn allowed the application of interchangeable parts, collaborated on plans to manufacture block-making machinery. By 1805, the dockyard had been fully updated with the revolutionary, purpose-built machinery at a time when products were still built individually with different components. A total of 45 machines were required to perform 22 processes on the blocks, which could be made into one of three possible sizes. The machines were almost entirely made of metal thus improving their accuracy and durability. The machines would make markings and indentations on the blocks to ensure alignment throughout the process. One of the many advantages of this new method was the increase in labour productivity due to the less labour-intensive requirements of managing the machinery. Richard Beamish, assistant to Brunel's son and engineer, Isambard Kingdom Brunel, wrote:

So that ten men, by the aid of this machinery, can accomplish with uniformity, celerity and ease, what formerly required the uncertain labour of one hundred and ten.

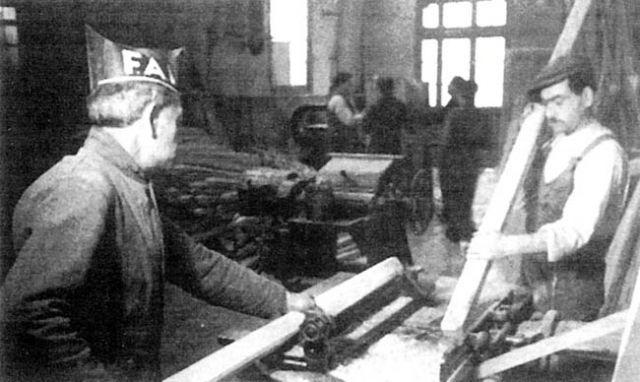
CNT-FAI worker cooperative in Barcelona producing wood and steel products

By 1808, annual production from the 45 machines had reached 130,000 blocks and some of the equipment was still in operation as late as the mid-twentieth century. Mass production techniques were also used to rather limited extent to make clocks and watches, and to make small arms, though parts were usually non-interchangeable. Though produced on a very small scale, Crimean War gunboat engines designed and assembled by John Penn of Greenwich are recorded as the first instance of the application of mass production techniques (though not necessarily the assembly-line method) to marine engineering. In filling an Admiralty order for 90 sets to his high-pressure and high-revolution horizontal trunk engine design, Penn produced them all in 90 days. He also used Whitworth Standard threads throughout. Prerequisites for the wide use of mass production were interchangeable parts, machine tools and power, especially in the form of electricity.

Some of the organizational management concepts needed to create 20th-century mass production, such as scientific management, had been pioneered by other engineers (most of whom are not famous, but Frederick Winslow Taylor is one of the well-known ones), whose work would later be synthesized into fields such as industrial engineering, manufacturing engineering, operations research, and management consultancy. Although after leaving the Henry Ford Company which was rebranded as Cadillac and later was awarded the Dewar Trophy in 1908 for creating interchangeable mass-produced precision engine parts, Henry Ford downplayed the role of Taylorism in the development of mass production at his company. However, Ford management performed time studies and experiments to mechanize their factory processes, focusing on minimizing worker movements. The difference is that while Taylor focused mostly on efficiency of the worker, Ford also substituted for labor by using machines, thoughtfully arranged, wherever possible.

In 1807, Eli Terry was hired to produce 4,000 wooden movement clocks in the Porter Contract. At this time, the annual yield for wooden clocks did not exceed a few dozen on average. Terry developed a milling machine in 1795, in which he perfected Interchangeable parts. In 1807, Terry developed a spindle cutting machine, which could produce multiple parts at the same time. Terry hired Silas Hoadley and Seth Thomas to work the Assembly line at the facilities. The Porter Contract was the first contract which called for mass production of clock movements in history. In 1815, Terry began mass-producing the first shelf clock. Chauncey Jerome, an apprentice of Eli Terry mass-produced up to 20,000 brass clocks annually in 1840 when he invented the cheap 30-hour OG clock.

The United States Department of War sponsored the development of interchangeable parts for guns produced at the arsenals at Springfield, Massachusetts and Harpers Ferry, Virginia (now West Virginia) in the early decades of the 19th century, finally achieving reliable interchangeability by about 1850. This period coincided with the development of machine tools, with the armories designing and building many of their own. Some of the methods employed were a system of gauges for checking dimensions of the various parts and jigs and fixtures for guiding the machine tools and properly holding and aligning the work pieces. This system came to be known as armory practice or the American system of manufacturing, which spread throughout New England aided by skilled mechanics from the armories who were instrumental in transferring the technology to the sewing machines manufacturers and other industries such as machine tools, harvesting machines and bicycles. Singer Manufacturing Co., at one time the largest sewing machine manufacturer, did not achieve interchangeable parts until the late 1880s, around the same time Cyrus McCormick adopted modern manufacturing practices in making harvesting machines.

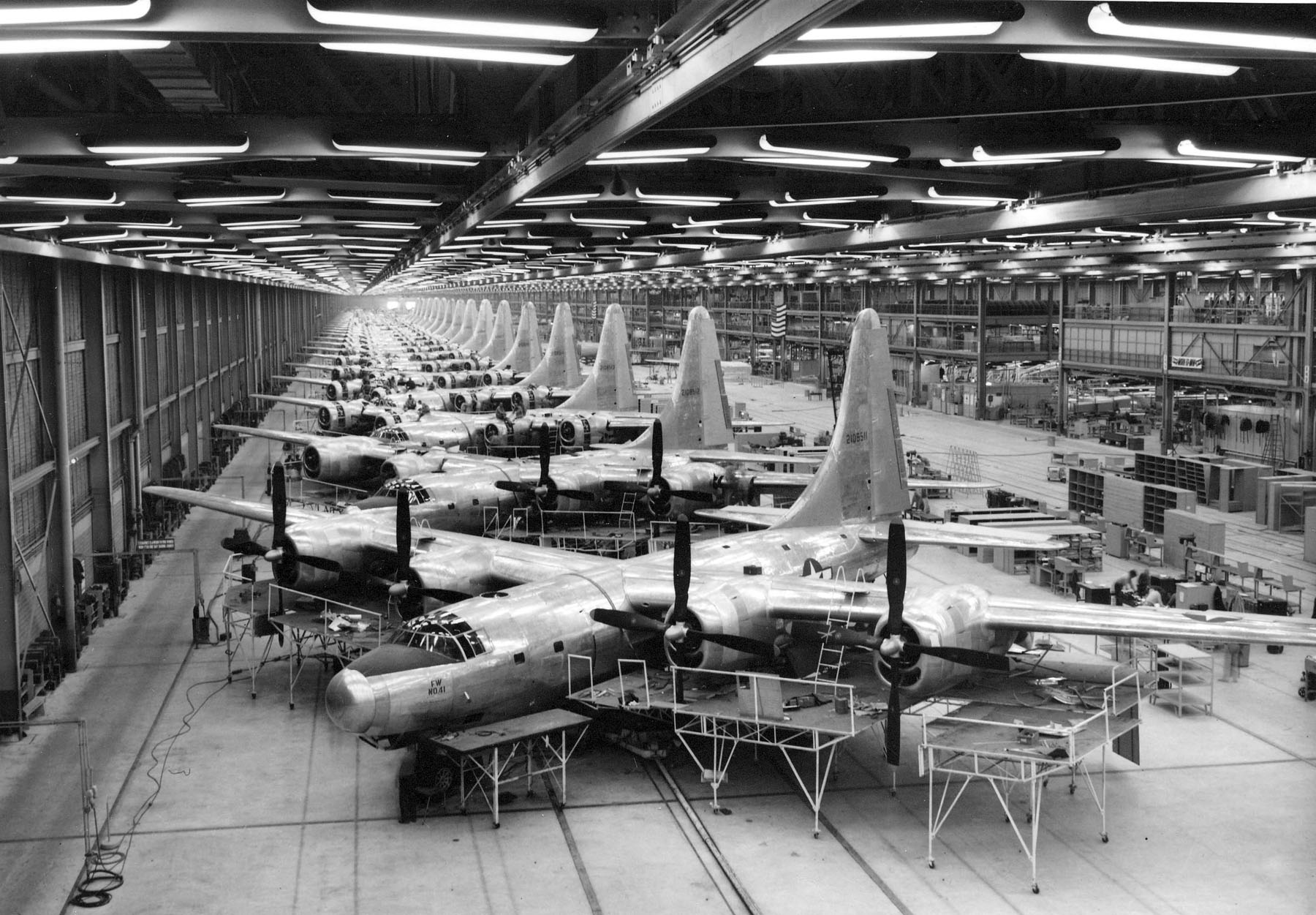
Mass production of Consolidated B-32 Dominator airplanes at Consolidated Aircraft Plant No. 4, near Fort Worth, Texas, during World War II

During World War II, The United States mass-produced many vehicles and weapons, such as ships (i.e. Liberty Ships, Higgins boats ), aircraft (i.e. North American P-51 Mustang, Consolidated B-24 Liberator, Boeing B-29 Superfortress), jeeps (i.e. Willys MB), trucks, tanks (i.e. M4 Sherman) and M2 Browning and M1919 Browning machine guns. Many vehicles, transported by ships have been shipped in parts and later assembled on-site.

For the ongoing energy transition, many wind turbine components and solar panels are being mass-produced. Wind turbines and solar panels are being used in respectively wind farms and solar farms.

In addition, in the ongoing climate change mitigation, large-scale carbon sequestration (through reforestation, blue carbon restoration, etc) has been proposed. Some projects (such as the Trillion Tree Campaign) involve planting a very large amount of trees. In order to speed up such efforts, fast propagation of trees may be useful. Some automated machines have been produced to allow for fast (vegetative) plant propagation.Also, for some plants that help to sequester carbon (such as seagrass), techniques have been developed to help speed up the process .

Mass production benefited from the development of materials such as inexpensive steel, high strength steel and plastics. Machining of metals was greatly enhanced with high-speed steel and later very hard materials such as tungsten carbide for cutting edges. Fabrication using steel components was aided by the development of electric welding and stamped steel parts, both which appeared in industry in about 1890. Plastics such as polyethylene, polystyrene and polyvinyl chloride (PVC) can be easily formed into shapes by extrusion, blow molding or injection molding, resulting in very low cost manufacture of consumer products, plastic piping, containers and parts.

An influential article that helped to frame and popularize the 20th century's definition of mass production appeared in a 1926 Encyclopædia Britannica supplement. The article was written based on correspondence with Ford Motor Company and is sometimes credited as the first use of the term.

=== Factory electrification ===
Electrification of factories began very gradually in the 1890s after the introduction of a practical DC motor by Frank J. Sprague and accelerated after the AC motor was developed by Galileo Ferraris, Nikola Tesla and Westinghouse, Mikhail Dolivo-Dobrovolsky and others. Electrification of factories was fastest between 1900 and 1930, aided by the establishment of electric utilities with central stations and the lowering of electricity prices from 1914 to 1917.

Electric motors were several times more efficient than small steam engines because central station generation were more efficient than small steam engines and because line shafts and belts had high friction losses. Electric motors also allowed more flexibility in manufacturing and required less maintenance than line shafts and belts. Many factories saw a 30% increase in output simply from changing over to electric motors.

Electrification enabled modern mass production, as with Thomas Edison's iron ore processing plant (about 1893) that could process 20,000 tons of ore per day with two shifts, each of five men. At that time it was still common to handle bulk materials with shovels, wheelbarrows and small narrow-gauge rail cars, and for comparison, a canal digger in previous decades typically handled five tons per 12-hour day.

The biggest impact of early mass production was in manufacturing everyday items, such as at the Ball Brothers Glass Manufacturing Company, which electrified its mason jar plant in Muncie, Indiana, U.S., around 1900. The new automated process used glass-blowing machines to replace 210 craftsman glass blowers and helpers. A small electric truck was used to handle 150 dozen bottles at a time where previously a hand truck would carry six dozen. Electric mixers replaced men with shovels handling sand and other ingredients that were fed into the glass furnace. An electric overhead crane replaced 36 day laborers for moving heavy loads across the factory.

According to Henry Ford:

The provision of a whole new system of electric generation emancipated industry from the leather belt and line shaft, for it eventually became possible to provide each tool with its own electric motor. This may seem only a detail of minor importance. In fact, modern industry could not be carried out with the belt and line shaft for a number of reasons. The motor enabled machinery to be arranged in the order of the work, and that alone has probably doubled the efficiency of industry, for it has cut out a tremendous amount of useless handling and hauling. The belt and line shaft were also tremendously wasteful – so wasteful indeed that no factory could be really large, for even the longest line shaft was small according to modern requirements. Also high speed tools were impossible under the old conditions – neither the pulleys nor the belts could stand modern speeds. Without high speed tools and the finer steels which they brought about, there could be nothing of what we call modern industry.

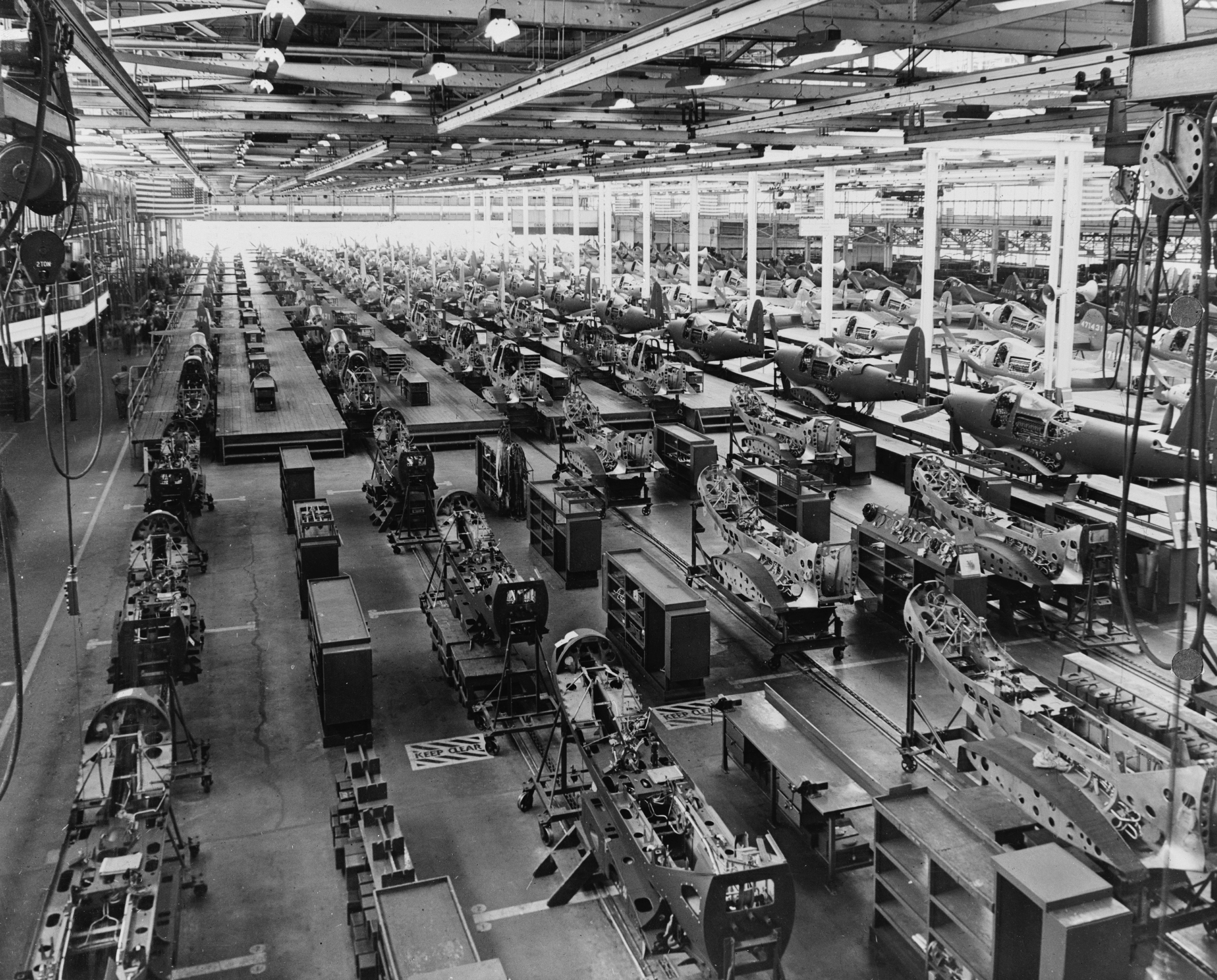
The assembly plant of the Bell Aircraft Corporation in 1944. Note parts of overhead crane at both sides of photo near top.

Mass production was popularized in the late 1910s and 1920s by Henry Ford's Ford Motor Company, which introduced electric motors to the then-well-known technique of chain or sequential production. Ford also bought or designed and built special purpose machine tools and fixtures such as multiple spindle drill presses that could drill every hole on one side of an engine block in one operation and a multiple head milling machine that could simultaneously machine 15 engine blocks held on a single fixture. All of these machine tools were arranged systematically in the production flow and some had special carriages for rolling heavy items into machining position. Production of the Ford Model T used 32,000 machine tools.

=== Buildings ===
The process of prefabrication, wherein parts are created separately from the finished product, is at the core of all mass-produced construction. Early examples include movable structures reportedly utilized by Akbar the Great, and the chattel houses built by emancipated slaves on Barbados. The Nissen hut, first used by the British during World War I, married prefabrication and mass production in a way that suited the needs of the military. The simple structures, which cost little and could be erected in just a couple of hours, were highly successful: over 100,000 Nissen huts were produced during World War I alone, and they would go on to serve in other conflicts and inspire a number of similar designs.

Following World War II, in the United States, William Levitt pioneered the building of standardized tract houses in 56 different locations around the country. These communities were dubbed Levittowns, and they were able to be constructed quickly and cheaply through the leveraging of economies of scale, as well as the specialization of construction tasks in a process akin to an assembly line. This era also saw the invention of the mobile home, a small prefabricated house that can be transported cheaply on a truck bed.

In the modern industrialization of construction, mass production is often used for prefabrication of house components.

=== Fabrics and materials ===
Mass production has significantly impacted the fashion industry, particularly in the realm of fibers and materials. The advent of synthetic fibers, such as polyester and nylon, revolutionized textile manufacturing by providing cost-effective alternatives to natural fibers. This shift enabled the rapid production of inexpensive clothing, contributing to the rise of fast fashion. This reliance on mass production has raised concerns about environmental sustainability and labor conditions, spurring the need for greater ethical and sustainable practices within the fashion industry.

== The use of assembly lines ==
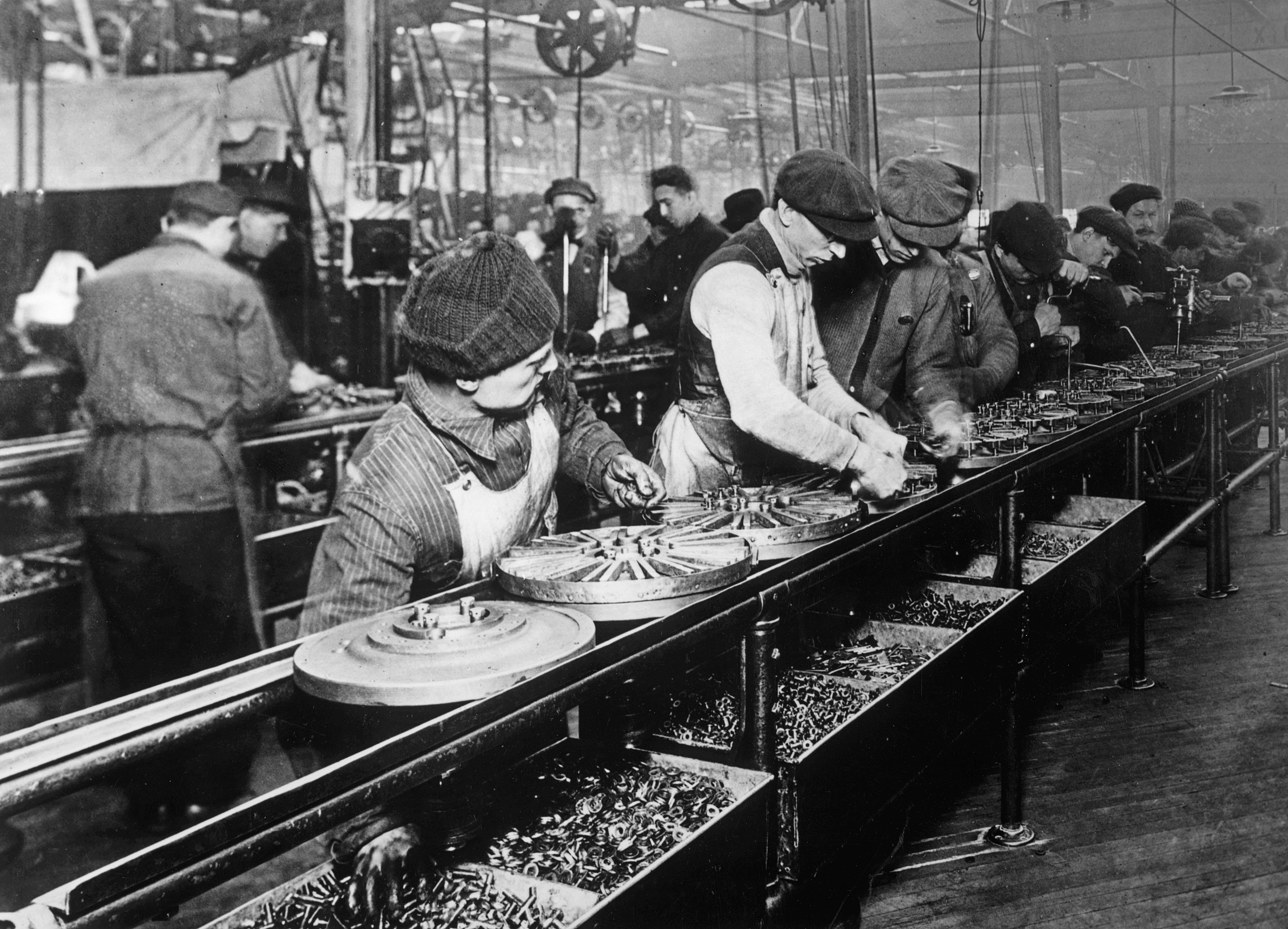
Ford assembly line, 1913. The magneto assembly line was the first.

Mass production systems for items made of numerous parts are usually organized into assembly lines. The assemblies pass by on a conveyor, or if they are heavy, hung from an overhead crane or monorail.

In a factory for a complex product, rather than one assembly line, there may be many auxiliary assembly lines feeding sub-assemblies (i.e. car engines or seats) to a backbone "main" assembly line. A diagram of a typical mass-production factory looks more like the skeleton of a fish than a single line.

== Vertical integration ==
Vertical integration is a business practice that involves gaining complete control over a product's production, from raw materials to final assembly.

In the age of mass production, this caused shipping and trade problems in that shipping systems were unable to transport huge volumes of finished automobiles (in Henry Ford's case) without causing damage, and also government policies imposed trade barriers on finished units.

Ford built the Ford River Rouge Complex with the idea of making the company's own iron and steel in the same large factory site where parts and car assembly took place. River Rouge also generated its own electricity.

Upstream vertical integration, such as to raw materials, is away from leading technology toward mature, low-return industries. Most companies chose to focus on their core business rather than vertical integration. This included buying parts from outside suppliers, who could often produce them as cheaply or cheaper.

Standard Oil, the major oil company in the 19th century, was vertically integrated partly because there was no demand for unrefined crude oil, but kerosene and some other products were in great demand. The other reason was that Standard Oil monopolized the oil industry. The major oil companies were, and many still are, vertically integrated, from production to refining and with their own retail stations, although some sold off their retail operations. Some oil companies also have chemical divisions.

Lumber and paper companies at one time owned most of their timber lands and sold some finished products such as corrugated boxes. The tendency has been to divest of timber lands to raise cash and to avoid property taxes.

== Advantages and disadvantages ==
The economies of mass production come from several sources. The primary cause is a reduction of non-productive effort of all types. In craft production, the craftsman must bustle about a shop, getting parts and assembling them. He must locate and use many tools many times for varying tasks. In mass production, each worker repeats one or a few related tasks that use the same tool to perform identical or near-identical operations on a stream of products. The exact tool and parts are always at hand, having been moved down the assembly line consecutively. The worker spends little or no time retrieving and/or preparing materials and tools, and so the time taken to manufacture a product using mass production is shorter than when using traditional methods.

The probability of human error and variation is also reduced, as tasks are predominantly carried out by machinery; error in operating such machinery has more far-reaching consequences. A reduction in labour costs, as well as an increased rate of production, enables a company to produce a larger quantity of one product at a lower cost than using traditional, non-linear methods.

However, mass production is inflexible because it is difficult to alter a design or production process after a production line is implemented. Also, all products produced on one production line will be identical or very similar, and introducing variety to satisfy individual tastes is not easy. However, some variety can be achieved by applying different finishes and decorations at the end of the production line if necessary. The starter cost for the machinery can be expensive so the producer must be sure it sells or the producers will lose a lot of money.

The Ford Model T produced tremendous affordable output but was not very good at responding to demand for variety, customization, or design changes. As a consequence Ford eventually lost market share to General Motors, who introduced annual model changes, more accessories and a choice of colors.

With each passing decade, engineers have found ways to increase the flexibility of mass production systems, driving down the lead times on new product development and allowing greater customization and variety of products.

Compared with other production methods, mass production can create new occupational hazards for workers. This is partly due to the need for workers to operate heavy machinery while also working close together with many other workers. Preventative safety measures, such as fire drills, as well as special training is therefore necessary to minimise the occurrence of industrial accidents.

== Socioeconomic impacts ==
In the 1830s, French political thinker and historian Alexis de Tocqueville identified one of the key characteristics of America that would later make it so amenable to the development of mass production: the homogeneous consumer base. De Tocqueville wrote in his Democracy in America (1835) that "The absence in the United States of those vast accumulations of wealth which favor the expenditures of large sums on articles of mere luxury ... impact to the productions of American industry a character distinct from that of other countries' industries. [Production is geared toward] articles suited to the wants of the whole people".

Mass production improved productivity, which was a contributing factor to economic growth and the decline in work week hours, alongside other factors such as transportation infrastructures (canals, railroads and highways) and agricultural mechanization. These factors caused the typical work week to decline from 70 hours in the early 19th century to 60 hours late in the century, then to 50 hours in the early 20th century and finally to 40 hours in the mid-1930s.

Mass production permitted great increases in total production. Using a European crafts system into the late 19th century it was difficult to meet demand for products such as sewing machines and animal powered mechanical harvesters. By the late 1920s many previously scarce goods were in good supply. One economist has argued that this constituted "overproduction" and contributed to high unemployment during the Great Depression. Say's law denies the possibility of general overproduction and for this reason classical economists deny that it had any role in the Great Depression.

Mass production allowed the evolution of consumerism by lowering the unit cost of many goods used.

Mass production has been linked to the Fast Fashion Industry, often leaving the consumer with lower quality garments for a lower cost. Most fast-fashion clothing is mass-produced, which means it is typically made of cheap fabrics, such as polyester, and constructed poorly in order to keep short turnaround times to meet the demands of consumers and shifting trends.

== See also ==
- Batch production – Method of manufacturing where the products are made as specified groups or amounts
- Craft production – Factory where products are hand-made
- Continuous production – Production method without interruption
- Culture industry – Commercial mass marketing of culture
- Fast-moving consumer goods – Products that are sold quickly and at a relatively low cost
- Fordism – Ford's assembly-line mass production and consumption manufacturing system
- Ford Model T – American car (1908–1927)
- Great Divergence – West's economic growth vs other advanced regions
- Industrial engineering – Branch of engineering which deals with the optimization of complex processes or systems
- Industrialisation – Period of social and economic change from agrarian to industrial society
- Industrial Revolution – 1760–1840 agrarian to industrial era shift
- Additive manufacturing – Additive process used to make a 3D object
- Job production – Type of production
- Just-in-time (business) – Methodology used to improve production
- Licensed production – Production under license of technology developed elsewhere
- Manufacturing – Industrial activity producing goods for sale using labor and machines
- Mass customization – Technology that allows bespoke aspects in mass production
- Mass market – Market for goods produced on a large scale for a significant number of end consumers
- Mechanization – Process of changing from working by hand or with animals to work with machinery
- Modular construction systems – Construction technique: identical components are easier to mass-produce
- Operations management – In business operations, controlling the process of production of goods
- Outline of industrial organization – Overview of and topical guide to industrial organization
- Pilot plant – Pre-commercial production system
- Cost-of-production theory of value – Economic theory that determines value based on production costs
- Ready-made garment – Mass-produced clothing in standard sizes
- Scientific management – Theory of management
- Second Industrial Revolution – 1870–1914 electrical and chemical era
- Technological revolution – Period of rapid technological change
- Technological unemployment – Unemployment caused by technological change
