= Haizol =

Haizol (海智在线) is Chinese online custom manufacturing marketplace based in Shanghai.

== History ==
Haizol was founded in 2015 in Shanghai by She Ying and Xu Xiang. In 2016, the company launched Chinese- and English-language versions of its platform and received pre-A financing.

In 2017, Haizol raised a 40 million yuan Series A round. It followed with a financing round of nearly 100 million yuan from Zhishu Capital in 2018, and a Series B round of nearly 100 million yuan in 2019 led by Hongtai Fund, with participation from Zhongding Capital.

By 2019, Haizol had established domestic branches in Shenzhen, Suzhou, and Ningbo, as well as offices in the Philippines and the United States.

In 2025, Haizol announced a B+ financing round of more than 100 million yuan led by the National Service Trade Innovation Development Guidance Fund. In February 2026, the company opened a new headquarters in Shanghai's Caohejing Hi-Tech Development Zone.

== Platform ==
Haizol is an online platform for custom manufacturing and industrial sourcing. It operates an RFQ-based marketplace that connects buyers with Chinese factories for CNC machining, injection molding, sheet metal fabrication, metal casting, and related manufacturing services.

Haizol is separate from Haizol Global, which operates as a sourcing and manufacturing coordination service.
