= Plymouth, Connecticut =

- Town
- Town of Plymouth
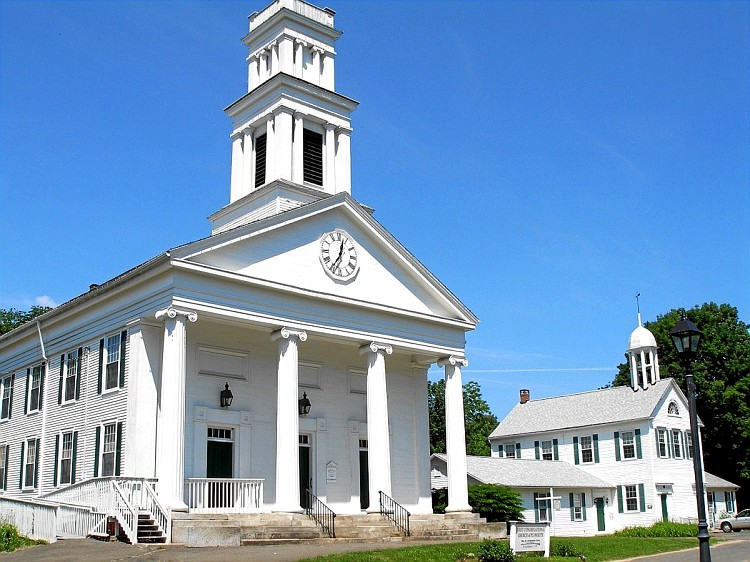
- First Congregational Church in Plymouth

- Seal

- Coordinates: 41°40′19″N 73°03′10″W
- Country: United States
- U.S. state: Connecticut
- County: Litchfield
- Region: Naugatuck Valley
- Incorporated: 1795

Government
  - Type: Mayor-council
  - Mayor: David Sekorski (D)
  - Town Council: Roxanne McCann (R); Daniel Gentile (R); Ron Tiscia (R); Nate Brown (R); Joe Green (R)

Area
  - Total: 22.4 sq mi (57.9 km^{2})
  - Land: 21.7 sq mi (56.1 km^{2})
  - Water: 0.42 sq mi (1.1 km^{2})
- Elevation: 873 ft (266 m)

Population (2020)
  - Total: 11,671
  - Density: 540/sq mi (208/km^{2})
- Time zone: UTC-5 (Eastern)
  - Summer (DST): UTC-4 (Eastern)
- ZIP code: 06782, 06786
- Area codes: 860/959
- FIPS code: 09-60750
- GNIS feature ID: 0213489
- Website: www.plymouthct.gov

Plymouth is a town in Litchfield County, Connecticut, United States, located within the Naugatuck Valley Planning Region. It is named after Plymouth, Devon, England. The population was 11,671 at the 2020 census, down from 12,243 at the 2010 census. The town of Plymouth includes the villages of Plymouth Center, Terryville and Pequabuck.

== History ==
The town was incorporated in 1795 and became known nationally for the manufacture of clocks. The town was named after Plymouth, Massachusetts. Plymouth (formerly Northbury, a section of Waterbury) was originally used as a burying ground for Waterbury. History records show that it was founded by a group of people who believed they had found a large deposit of lead. This fabled "lead mine" never actually existed (or is still yet to be discovered). The oldest home in the community is on Route 6, and dates to 1690–1700.

In the 1790s, George Washington traveled through here, both to visit relatives and to stay away from the coastline.

The Terry family participated in a great deal of Plymouth's history. Eli Terry became partners with Seth Thomas and Silas Hoadley to manufacture clocks in the Greystone section of town. Terry gave the factory to Hoadley and Thomas, and opened his own clock factory near Carter Road in Plymouth Center, while Thomas moved to Plymouth Hollow. Eli Terry Jr. (son of Eli Terry) joined with another man who was interested in the cabinet and lock industry, and they opened the Eagle Lock Company. In the 1880s, the Plymouth Hollow section of Plymouth decided to split off and become the town of Thomaston, named after Seth Thomas. The Eagle Lock Company closed in the 1970s, and in 1975 the entire abandoned site burned, leaving one building left undamaged. The rest of the buildings were torn down or had floors removed.

The Main Street School was located on the green (Baldwin Park) in Terryville. It was demolished in the 1930s, and the new Terryville High School was constructed behind the green on North Main Street. In the mid-2000s, Prospect Street School and Main Street School (previously called East Main Street) were left abandoned, so the construction of the new Terryville High School could begin in the Holt section of town. The Harry S. Fisher Middle School was turned into the Harry S. Fisher Elementary School, and the old Terryville High School was turned into the Eli Terry Jr. Middle School.

== Geography ==
Plymouth is in southeastern Litchfield County and is bordered to the east by the city of Bristol in Hartford County and to the south by the city of Waterbury in New Haven County. Terryville, the largest community in Plymouth, is in the eastern part of town, while Plymouth Center is in the west. The community of Pequabuck is on the eastern border of the town, southeast of Terryville.

According to the United States Census Bureau, the town of Plymouth has a total area of 22.4 square miles (57.9 km^{2}), of which 21.9 square miles (56.7 km^{2}) are land and 0.4 square miles (1.1 km^{2}), or 1.99%, are water. Part of Mattatuck State Forest is in the southwest corner of the town.

=== Principal communities ===
- Allentown
- East Plymouth Historic District, listed on the NRHP in Connecticut
- Greystone
- Hancock
- Pequabuck (has its own post office)
- Plymouth Center, listed on the NRHP in Connecticut
- Terryville (has its own post office)
- Tolles
- Town Hill

== Demographics ==
Historical population
Census	Pop.	Note	%±
1820	1,758		—
1840	2,205		—
1850	2,568		16.5%
1860	3,244		26.3%
1870	4,140		27.6%
1880	2,350		−43.2%
1890	2,147		−8.6%
1900	2,828		31.7%
1910	5,021		77.5%
1920	5,942		18.3%
1930	6,070		2.2%
1940	6,043		−0.4%
1950	6,771		12.0%
1960	8,981		32.6%
1970	10,321		14.9%
1980	10,732		4.0%
1990	11,822		10.2%
2000	11,634		−1.6%
2010	12,243		5.2%
2020	11,671		−4.7%
U.S. Decennial Census

As of the census of 2000, there were 11,634 people, 4,453 households, and 3,228 families residing in the town. The population density was 535.6 inhabitants per square mile (206.8/km^{2}). There were 4,646 housing units at an average density of 213.9 per square mile (82.6/km^{2}). The racial makeup of the town was 97.34% White, 0.78% African American, 0.15% Native American, 0.42% Asian, 0.01% Pacific Islander, 0.32% from other races, and 0.97% from two or more races. Hispanic or Latino of any race were 1.26% of the population.

There were 4,453 households, out of which 34.2% had children under the age of 18 living with them, 58.7% were married couples living together, 9.7% had a female householder with no husband present, and 27.5% were non-families. 22.8% of all households were made up of individuals, and 9.2% had someone living alone who was 65 years of age or older. The average household size was 2.60 and the average family size was 3.06.

In the town, the population was spread out, with 25.8% under the age of 18, 6.5% from 18 to 24, 31.8% from 25 to 44, 23.3% from 45 to 64, and 12.7% who were 65 years of age or older. The median age was 38 years. For every 100 females, there were 99.1 males. For every 100 females age 18 and over, there were 95.6 males.

The median income for a household in the town was $53,750, and the median income for a family was $62,610. Males had a median income of $41,985 versus $32,359 for females. The per capita income for the town was $23,244. About 2.7% of families and 4.1% of the population were below the poverty line, including 2.9% of those under age 18 and 5.3% of those age 65 or over.

== Education ==
Plymouth is served by the Plymouth Public Schools District. There are four schools in the district and students attend Terryville High School.

=== Transportation ===
The town is served by U.S. Route 6, Connecticut Route 72, and Connecticut Route 262. Route 6 passes through Terryville and Plymouth Center, leading east through Bristol 22 miles (35 km) to Hartford, the state capital, and west through Thomaston, 8 miles (13 km) to Watertown. Route 72 least southeast 3 miles (5 km) to Bristol and north 9 miles (14 km) to Harwinton, while Route 262 south and west via a circuitous route to Oakville and Watertown.

== Notable people ==
- Judson Allen (1797–1880), United States congressman from New York
- Dorence Atwater (1845–1910), soldier who recorded 13,000 soldiers' deaths while he was a prisoner during the American Civil War; later a consul at Tahiti A monument honoring Atwater is on a hill overlooking Baldwin Park
- Moses Dunbar (1716–1777), the only person ever convicted of high treason in the state of Connecticut; lived in Plymouth and Bristol at the time
- Henry Dutton (1796–1869), 38th governor of Connecticut
- Calista Flockhart (born 1964), actress; family still lives in Todd Hollow
- Silas Hoadley (1786–1870), a clockmaker who learned from Eli Terry; owned his own clock factory in the Greystone section of town
- Ted Knight (1923–1986), actor from Terryville
- Frederick A. Scott (1866–1957), United States attorney for the district of Connecticut from Terryville
- Eli Terry (1772–1852), resident, clockmaker
