= First Church of Christ and the Ancient Burying Ground =

Historic church in Connecticut, United States

- U.S. National Register of Historic Places
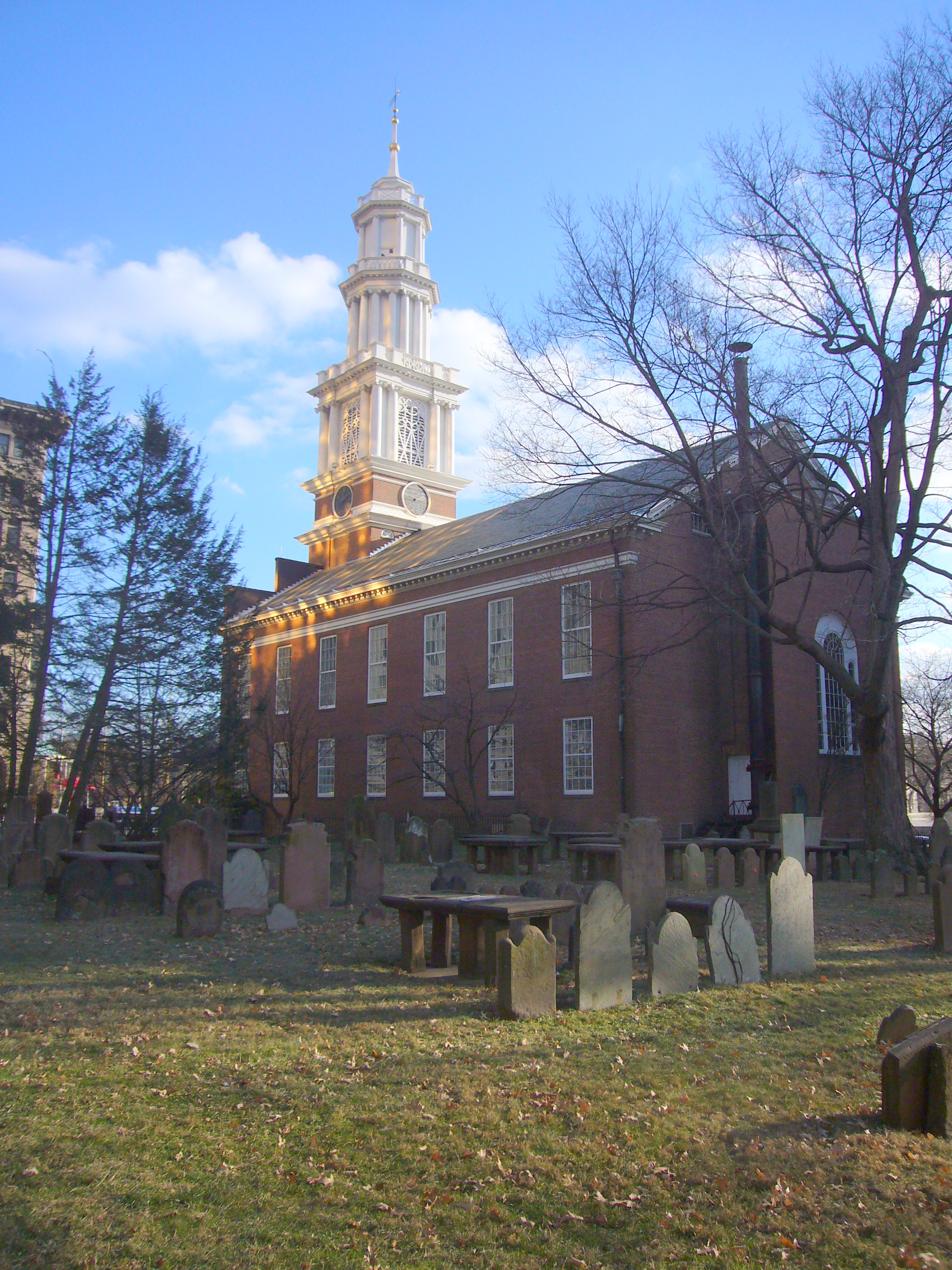
- First Church of Christ

- Location within Connecticut Location within the United States
- Location: 60 Gold Street, Hartford, Connecticut
- Coordinates: 41°45′52″N 72°40′26″W
- Area: 3 acres (1.2 ha)
- Built: 1807
- Architect: Wadsworth, Daniel
- NRHP reference No.: 72001324
- Added to NRHP: December 05, 1972

The First Church of Christ and the Ancient Burying Ground (also known as Center Church: First Church of Christ in Hartford or First Church in Hartford) is a historic church and cemetery at 60 Gold Street in Hartford, Connecticut, United States. It is the oldest church congregation in Hartford, founded in 1636 by Thomas Hooker. The present building, the congregation's fourth, was built in 1807, and was listed on the National Register of Historic Places in 1972. The adjacent cemetery, formally set apart in 1640, was the city's sole cemetery until 1803.

== Description ==
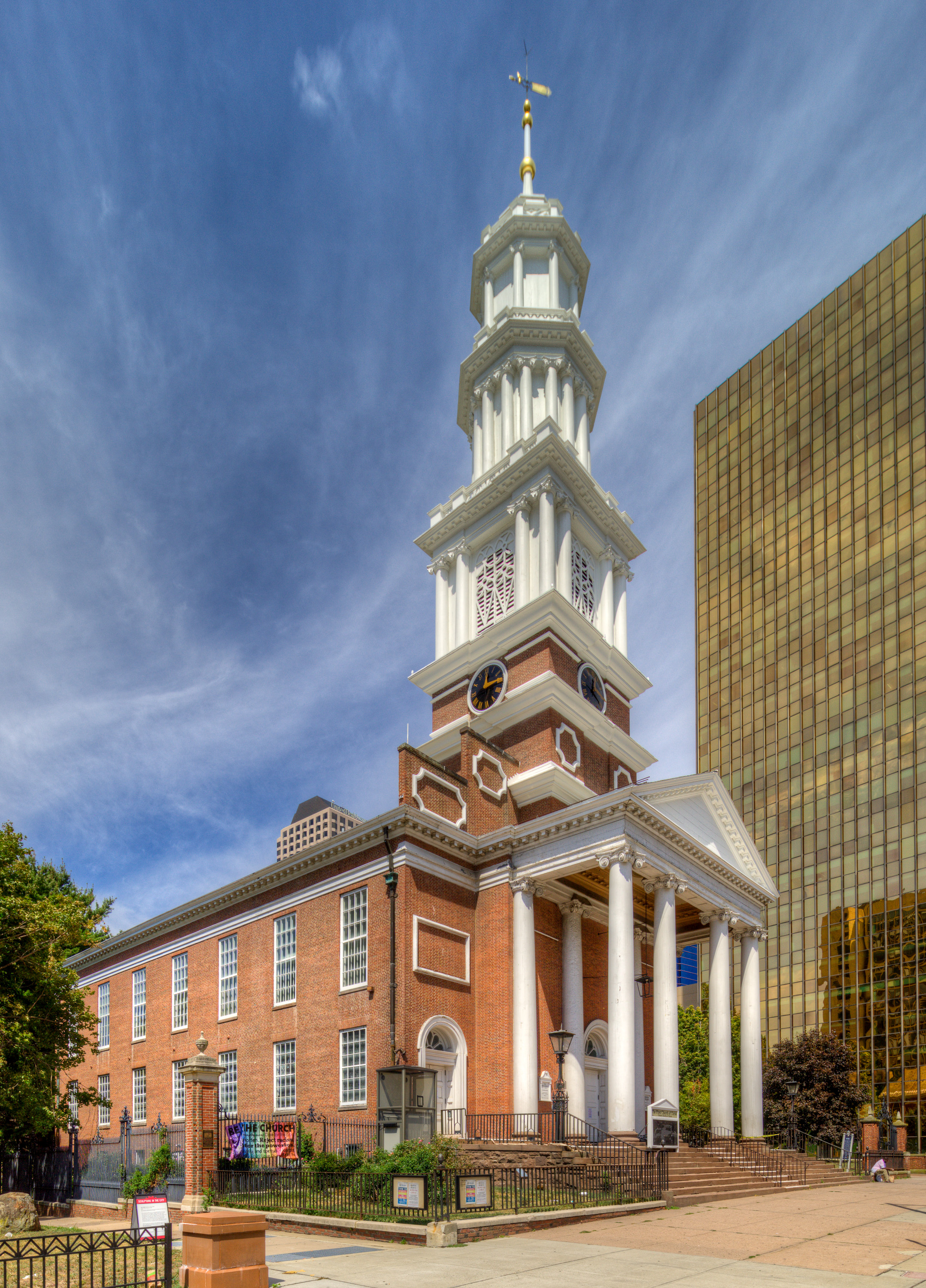
Main Street view

The First Church of Christ, located in downtown Hartford at the corner of Main and Gold Streets, is a prominent local example of Classical Revival architecture. Daniel Wadsworth probably designed it, loosely following the example of architect James Gibbs's church of Saint Martin in the Fields in London. A monumental two-story temple portico with modified Ionic columns forms the entrance to the brick structure, and is surmounted by a three-stage tower that repeats the columns at an increasingly diminished scale at each major level. There are three entrances on the main facade, each topped by a half-round fanlight window. The Ancient Burying Ground extends west and north of the church and features a variety of stones made from many different carvers out of different materials such as brownstone, schist, slate and marble.

== History ==
The Hartford congregation was founded as a Reformed congregation in 1636 with Thomas Hooker serving as the first pastor. The members of the congregation had previously migrated from England to Massachusetts and spent four years there before leaving Massachusetts after a dispute with the Puritan leaders of the Massachusetts Bay Colony. The old burial ground adjacent to the building in Hartford dates to around 1640 with the oldest surviving tombstone in the yard dating from 1648. The current church meeting house dates to 1807 and is the fourth meeting house to serve as a place of worship for the congregation. The church meeting house and cemetery were added to the National Register of Historic Places in 1972. The congregation is currently affiliated with the United Church of Christ (UCC).

== Notable members and persons buried in the burying ground ==
- Thomas Hooker, Founder of Connecticut
- William Leete, Governor of Connecticut
- Joseph Talcott, Governor of Connecticut
- Jeremiah Wadsworth, United States House of Representatives
- Thomas Welles, Governor of Connecticut
- George Wyllys, Governor of Connecticut
- Moses Dunbar, Loyalist put to death for High Treason, first person executed by the state of Connecticut

== Gallery ==
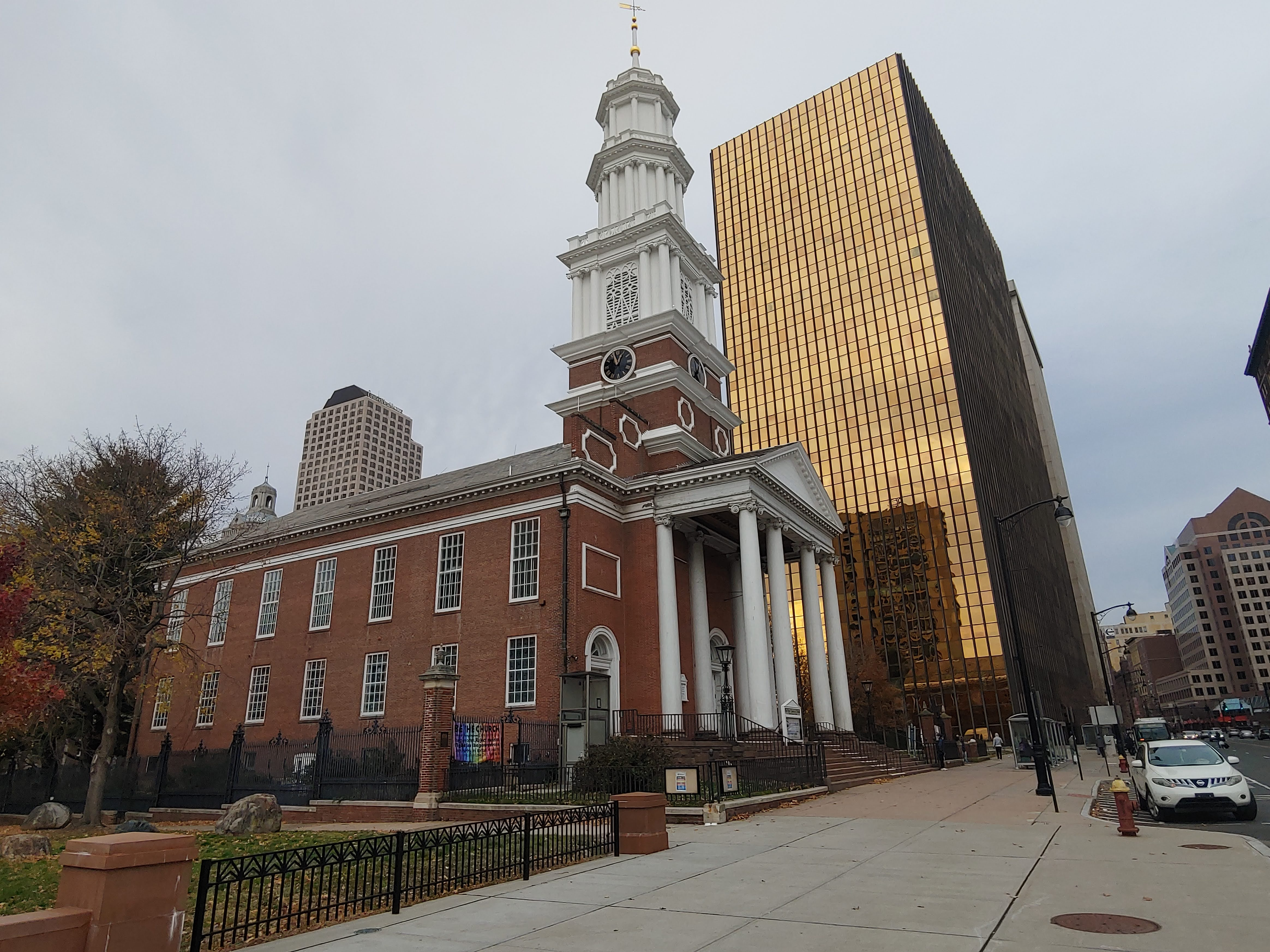
Angled frontal view of the church.

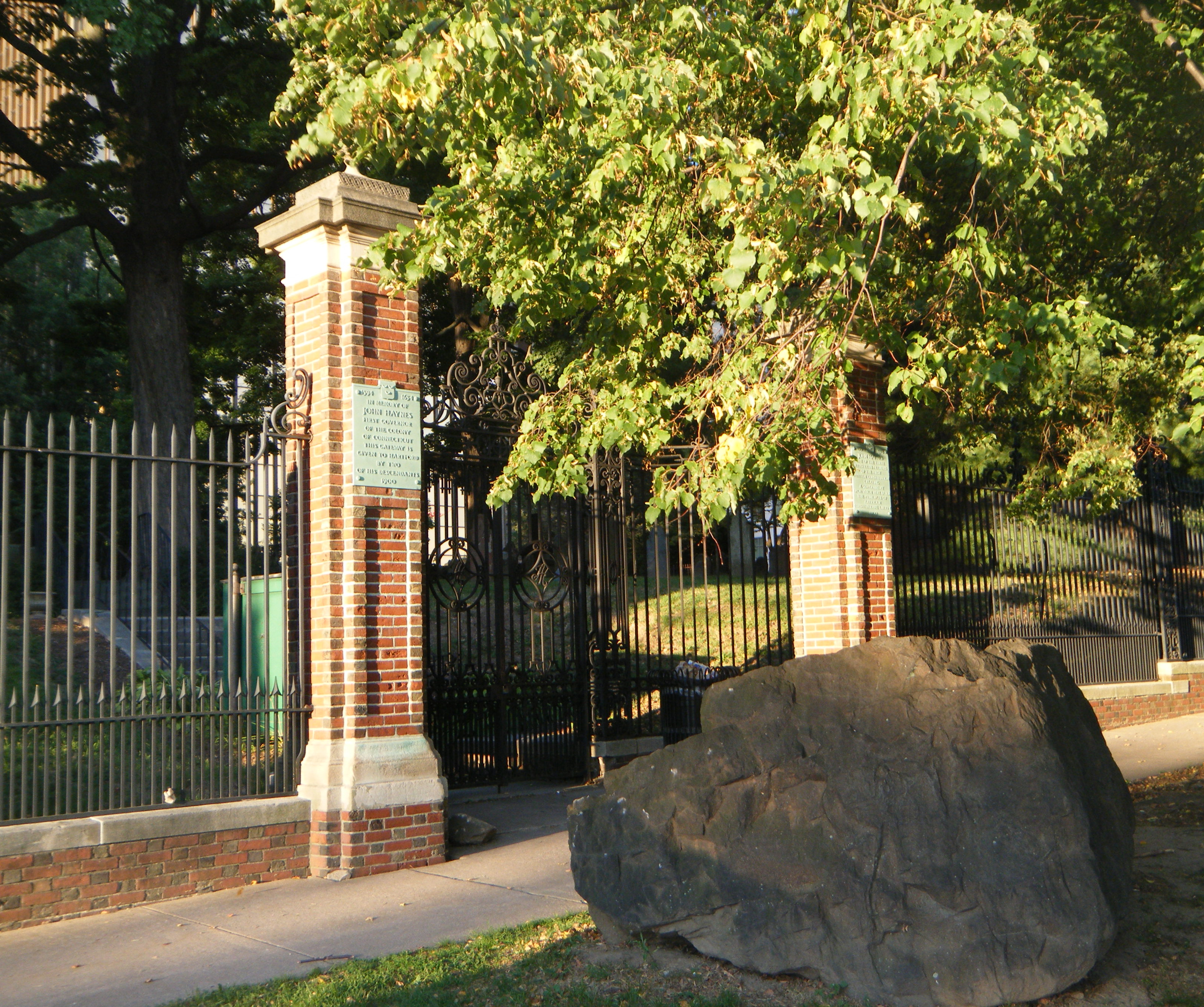
Gateway to the Ancient Burying Ground

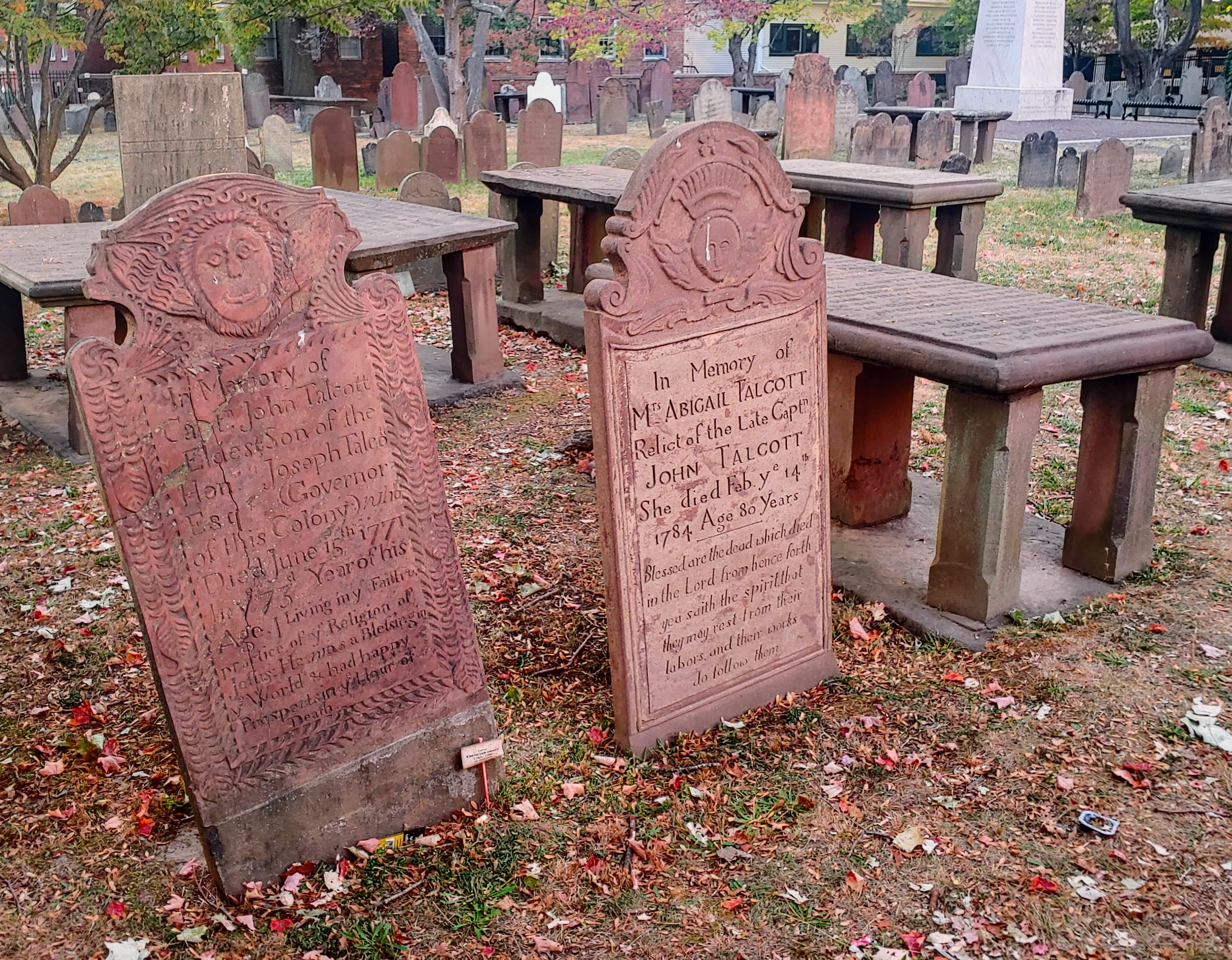
Mix of brownstone graves in the cemetery.

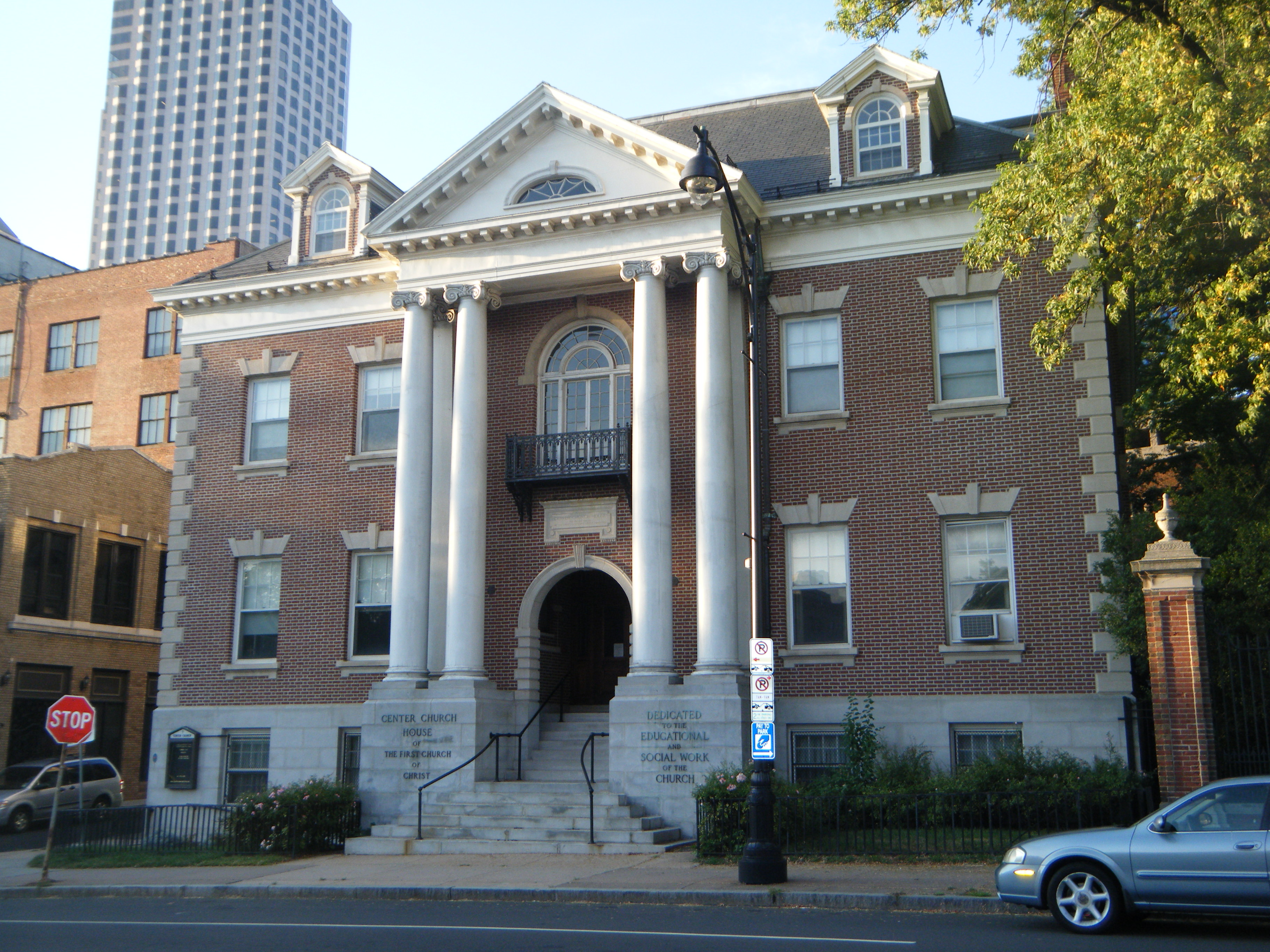
Center Church House

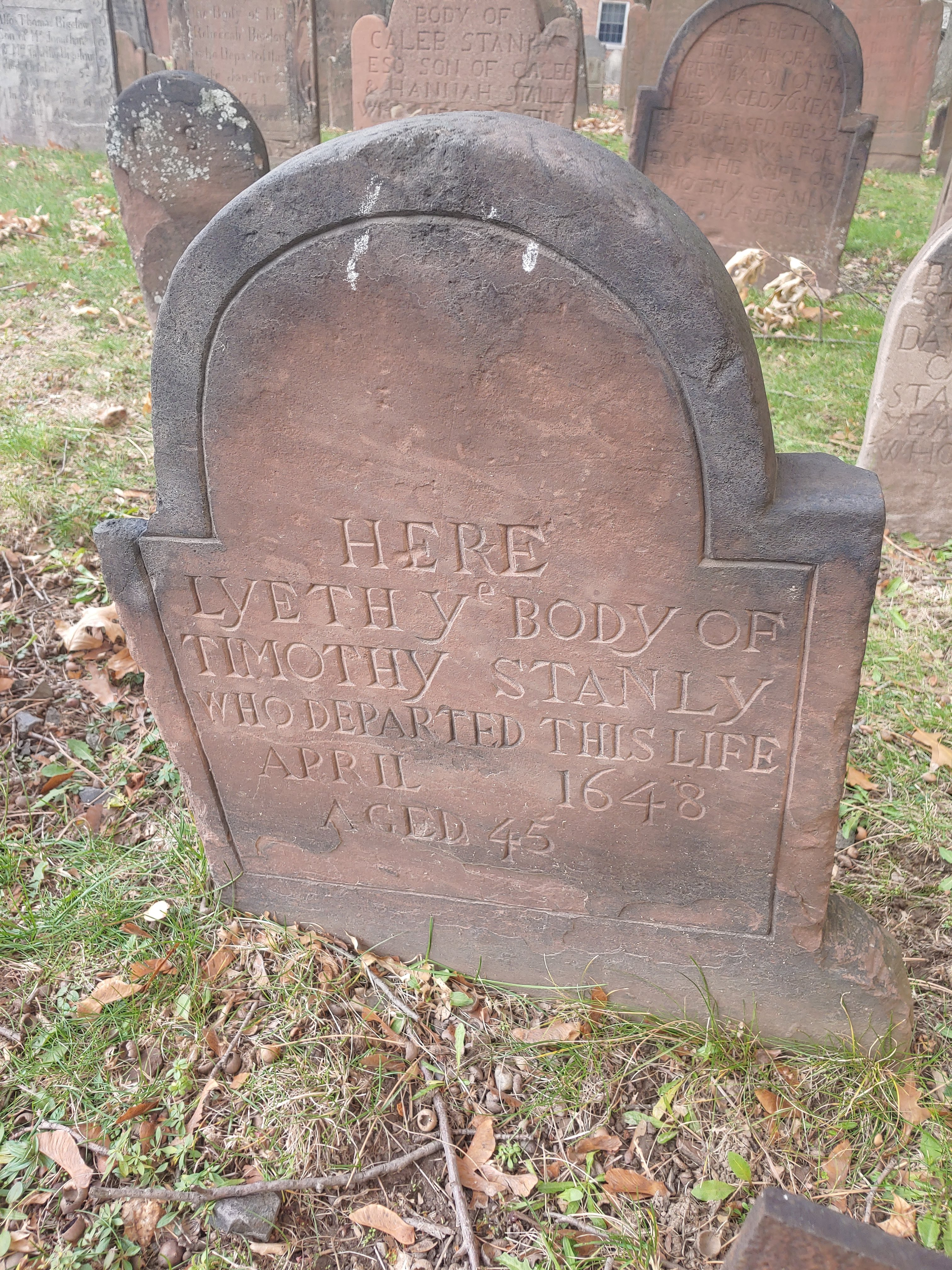
The Stone of Timothy Stanley, the oldest tombstone in the yard dating to 1648, carved by George Griswold of Windsor CT

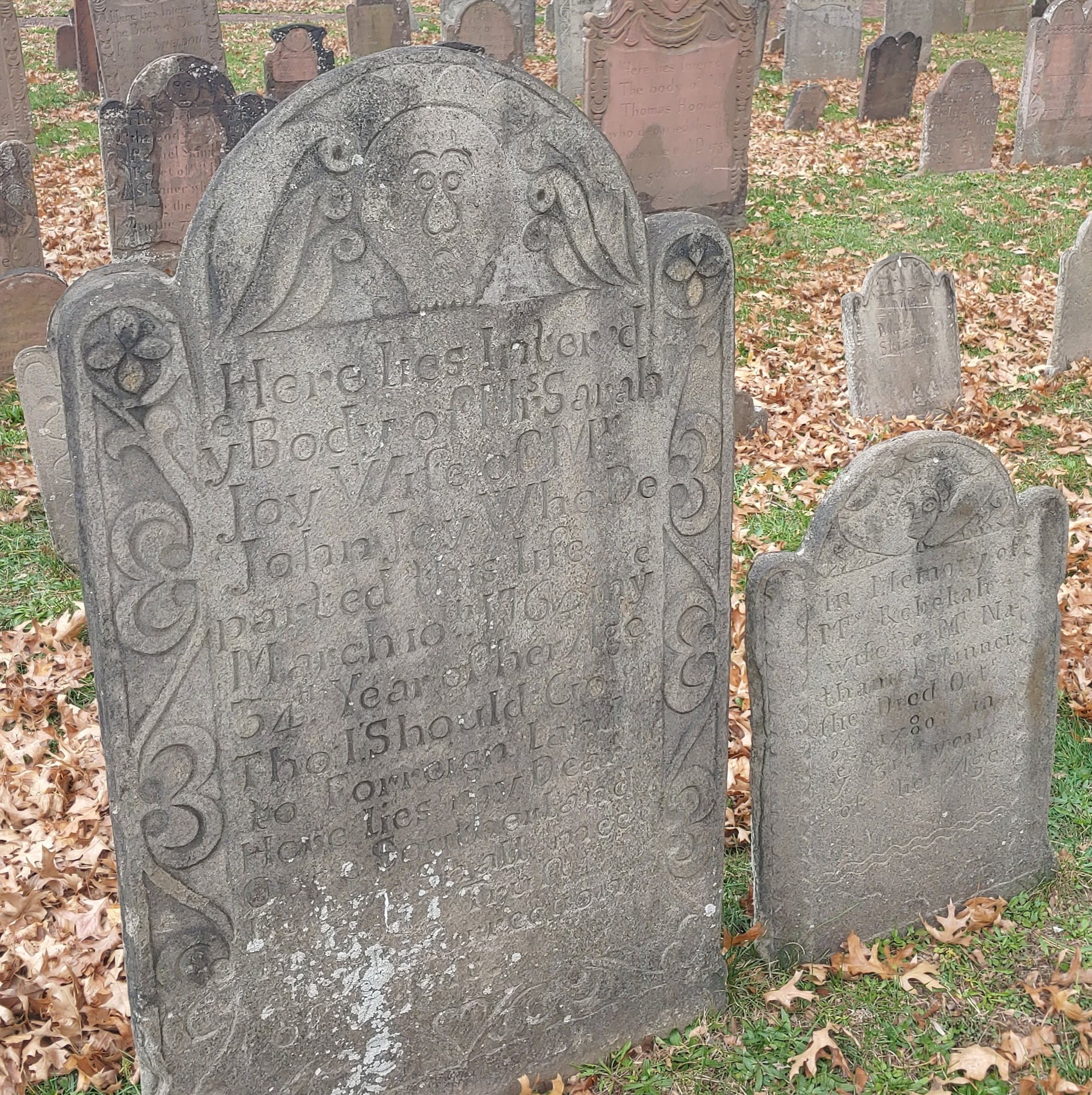
Schist tombstones carved (left to right) by Gershom Bartlett and Aaron Haskins.

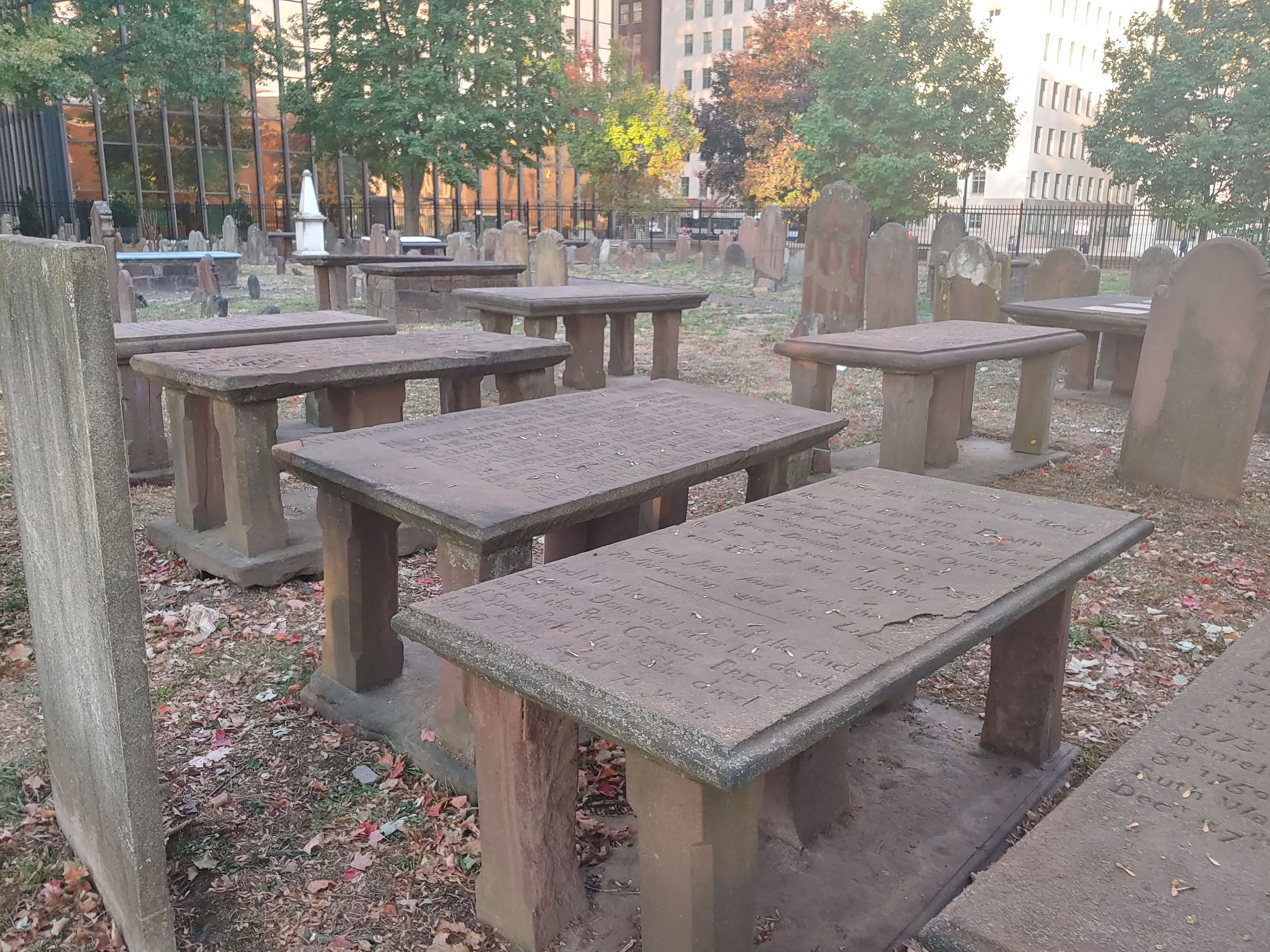
Group of Tabletop Grave Markers from the 1700s in the Ancient Burying Ground

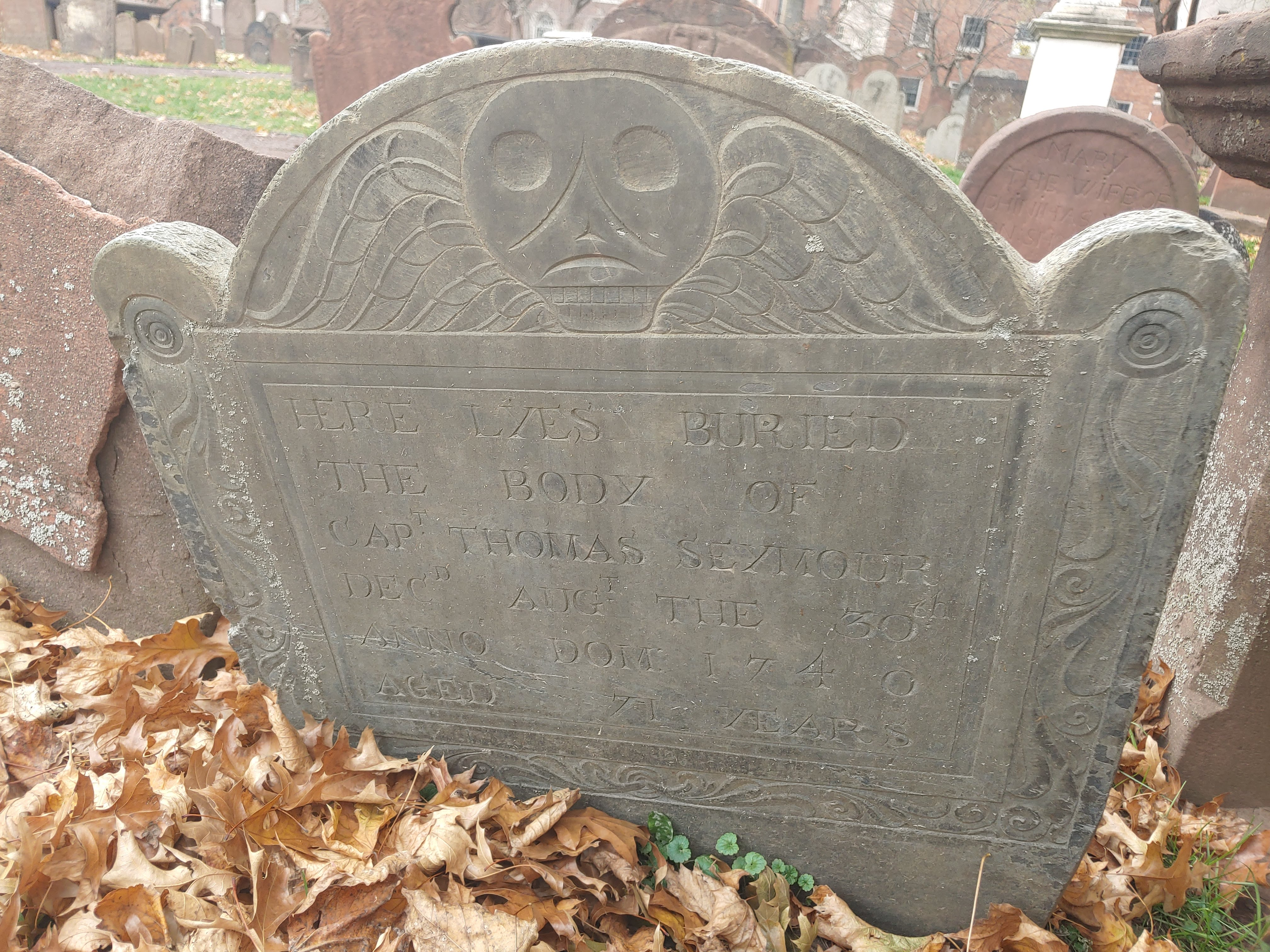
Slate Tombstone from 1740 with deaths head imagery, carved in Boston

== See also ==
- Founders of Hartford, Connecticut
- National Register of Historic Places in Hartford, Connecticut
