= Silas Hoadley =

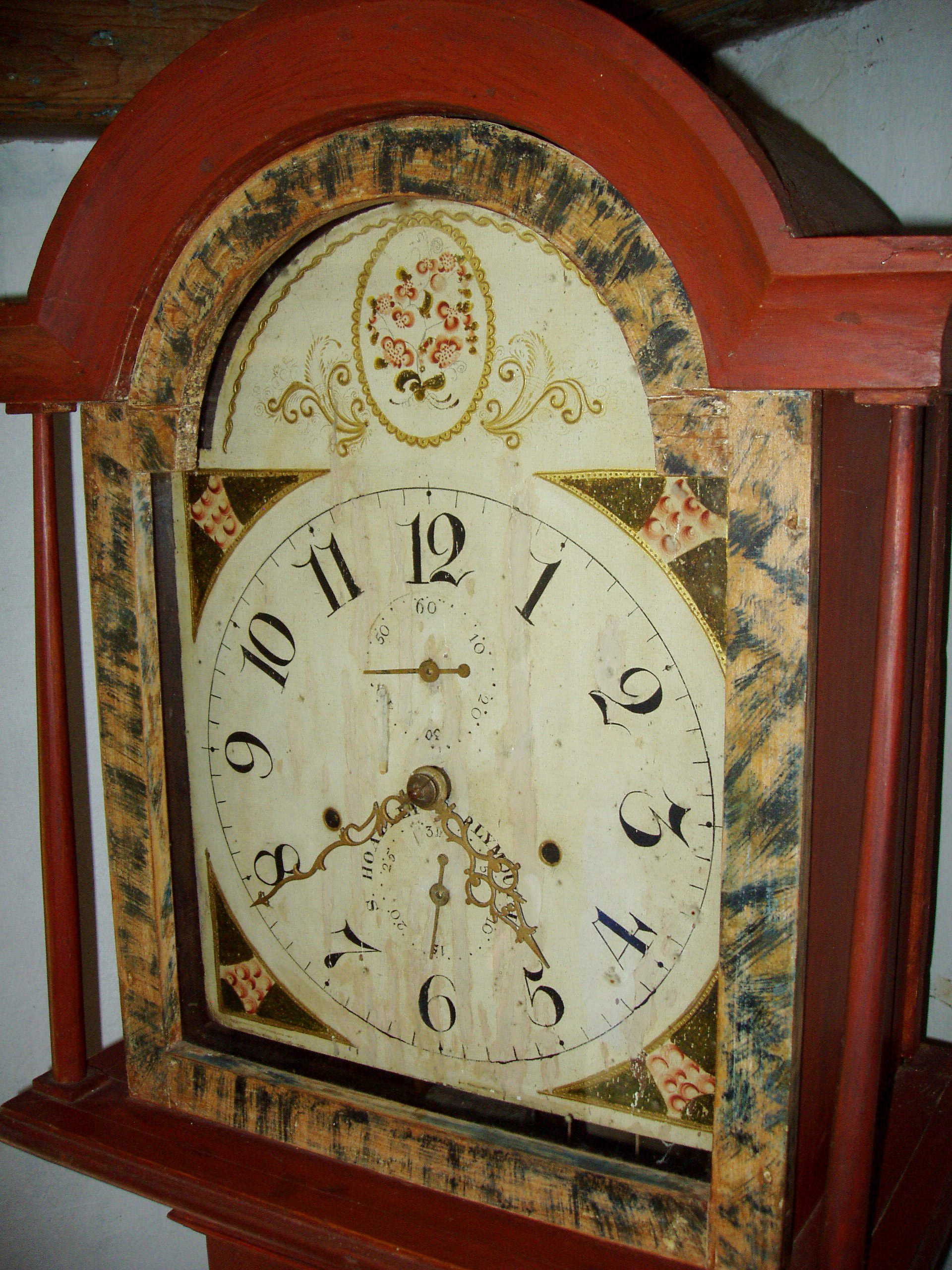
Silas Hoadley clock face

Silas Hoadley (1786 – December 28, 1870) was an American clockmaker.

== Biography ==
Hoadley was born in Bethany, Connecticut on January 31, 1786. He was a cousin of the architect and builder David Hoadley. He received little formal education before becoming apprentice carpenter to his uncle Calvin Hoadley. In 1809 his apprenticeship ended, and he formed a clock-making partnership in Plymouth, Connecticut with Eli Terry and Seth Thomas as Terry, Thomas & Hoadley.

The partners gradually withdrew to create their own firms – Terry in 1810, Thomas in 1814 – leaving Silas Hoadley as sole owner. He continued to make mantel and tall clocks until 1849.

Hoadley was a Freemason of high standing and one of the most respected and oldest members of Harmony lodge, No. 42 F. and A. M. having been intimately associated with the lodge in Watertown, Connecticut in 1817. his lodge bears testimony that "His heart was in the right place, with a hand as open as the day to meeting charity, of him it may be truly said an honest man is the noblest work of god".

Hoadley is the earliest documented practitioner of the decorative-art technique known as fumage in which impressions are made by the smoke of a candle or kerosene lamp. An example by Hoadley dating from circa 1810-1820 is in the permanent collection of the Museum of Fine Arts Boston.

Hoadley was elected to the Connecticut General Assembly several times, and in 1844 to the Connecticut State Senate. He died at Plymouth, Connecticut.

== Family life ==
Hoadley was married to Sarah N. Painter; they are buried together in West Cemetery, and share a stone. They had five children.

== Death ==
Hoadley died on December 28, 1870, and is interred at West Cemetery in Plymouth, Connecticut.
