= Plymouth Center Historic District =

Historic district in Connecticut, United States

- U.S. National Register of Historic Places
- U.S. Historic district
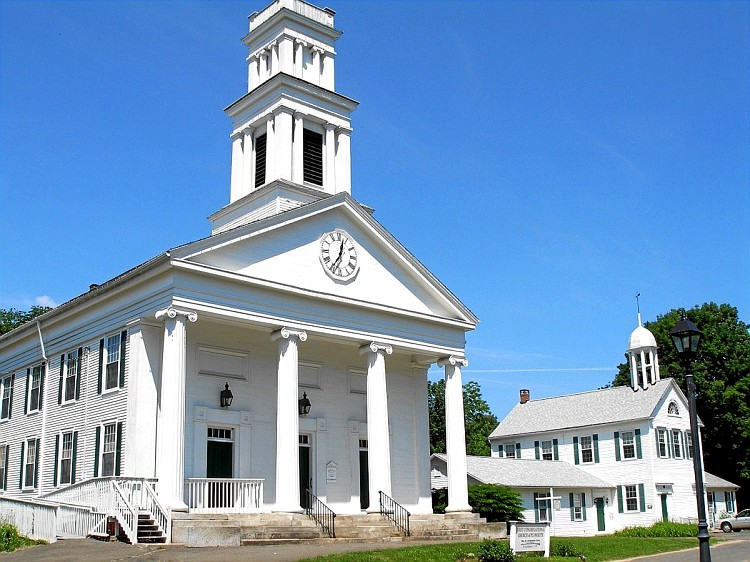

- Location within Connecticut Location within the United States
- Location: Roughly along Main, North, and South Streets, Carter, Hillside Avenue, Ives Crossing, and Maple Street, Plymouth, Connecticut
- Coordinates: 41.67194°N 73.05299°W
- Area: 130 acres (53 ha) (original size); 6 acres (2.4 ha) (size of 2000 increase)
- Architectural style: Colonial, Federal, et al.
- NRHP reference No.: 99000858 (original); 00001474 (increase)

Significant dates
- Added to NRHP: July 22, 1999
- Boundary increase: December 7, 2000

The Plymouth Center Historic District encompasses historic early village center of Plymouth, Connecticut. Stretching along Main, North and South Streets from their junction, it flourished in the 19th century with small-scale industries, but declined late in the century with the separation of Thomaston and the more significant industrial development at Terryville. The district features colonial, Federal, and Greek Revival architecture and was added to the National Register of Historic Places in 1999, with a slight enlargement the following year.

== Description and history ==
The area that is now Plymouth was originally part of Waterbury, and was first set off as a separate church parish in the 1740s. Plymouth, then including Thomaston, was incorporated in 1795. Its first town center was located at the Junction of the East-West Main Street (now U.S. Route 6) and North and South Streets, with the first meetinghouse at the southeast corner, and the town common at the northwest corner. The village thrived in the 19th century with a number small industries. The town suffered an economic blow when Thomaston was separated from it in 1875, and its civic focus was generally transferred to the Terryville industrial area in eastern Plymouth.

The historic district extends mainly east-west along Main Street, roughly between Carter Road in the west and Maple Street in the east. It also extends north along North Street beyond Plymouth Park (the original town common), and south along South Street and Maple Street for shorter distances. Plymouth Park is the focus of the village's religious and civic buildings, including the 1838 Greek Revival Congregational Church and the stone Gothic former St. Peter's Episcopal Church (built 1915, now owned by a Baptist congregation). The most common architectural style found in the district is the Greek Revival, which is represented both in fine houses, and in more vernacular forms found in worker housing on Maple Street.

== See also ==
- National Register of Historic Places listings in Litchfield County, Connecticut
