= Job production =

Type of production

Hand-separated large candlestick church chandelier with brass wax drip tray – GDR around 1980 – Use of armoured steel and brass – Single piece – Weight 10 kilograms

Job production, sometimes called jobbing or one-off production, involves producing custom work, such as a one-off product for a specific customer or a small batch of work in quantities usually less than those of mass-market products. Job production consists of an operator or group of operators working on a single job and completing it before proceeding to the next similar or different job. Together with batch production and mass production (flow production) it is one of the three main production methods.

Job production can be classical craft production by small firms (making railings for a specific house, building/repairing a computer for a specific customer, making flower arrangements for a specific wedding etc.), but large firms use job production, too, and the products of job production are often interchangeable, such as machined parts made by a job shop. Examples include:

- Designing and implementing an advertising campaign
- Auditing the accounts of a large public limited company
- Building a new factory
- Installing machinery in a factory
- Machining a batch of parts per a CAD drawing supplied by a customer
- Building the Golden Gate bridge

Fabrication shops and machine shops whose work is primarily of the job production type are often called job shops. The associated people or corporations are sometimes called jobbers.

Job production is, in essence, manufacturing on a contract basis, and thus it forms a subset of the larger field of contract manufacturing. But the latter field also includes, in addition to jobbing, a higher level of outsourcing in which a product-line-owning company entrusts its entire production to a contractor, rather than just outsourcing parts of it.

== Benefits and disadvantages ==
Key benefits of job production include:

- can provide emergency parts or services, such as quickly making a machine part that would take a long time to acquire otherwise
- can provide parts or services for machinery or systems that are otherwise not available, as when the original supplier no longer supports the product or goes out of business (orphaned)
- work is generally of a high quality
- a high level of customization is possible to meet the customer's exact requirements
- significant flexibility is possible, especially when compared to mass production
- workers can be easily motivated due to the skilled nature of the work they are performing

Disadvantages include:

- higher cost of production
- re-engineering: sometimes engineering drawings or an engineering assessment, including calculations or specifications, needs to be made before the work can be done
- requires the use of specialist labor (compared with the repetitive, low-skilled jobs in mass production)
- slow compared to other methods (batch production and mass production)

== Essential features ==
There are a number of features that should be implemented in a job production environment, they include:

- Clear definitions of objectives should be set.
- Clearly outlined decision making process.
- Clear list of specifications should be set.

== See also ==
- Instant manufacturing
- Just in Time
- Lean manufacturing
- Manufacturing
- Piece work
- Outline of industrial organization
