= East Plymouth Historic District =

Historic district in Connecticut, United States

- U.S. National Register of Historic Places
- U.S. Historic district
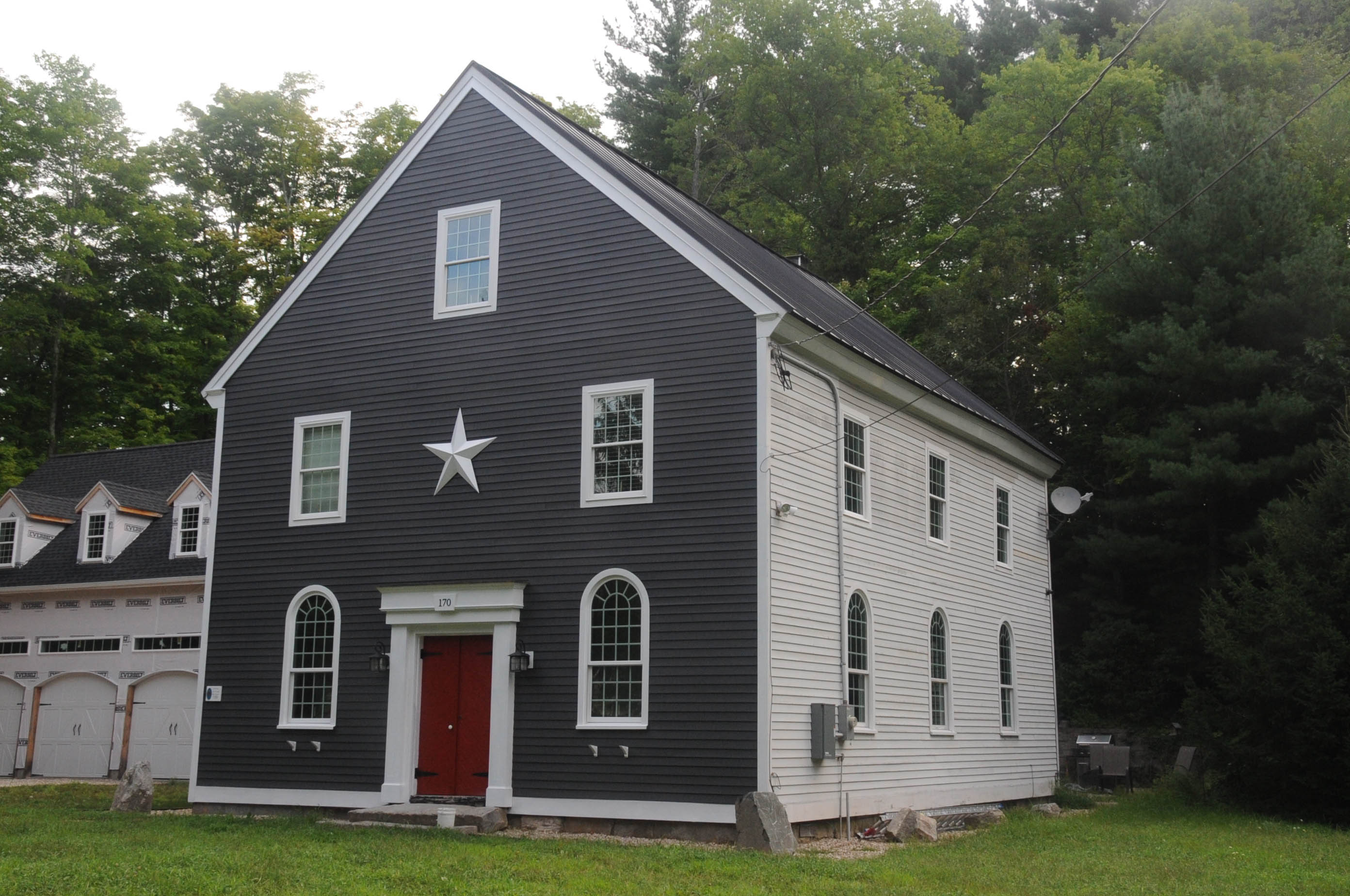
- St. Matthew's Church, converted into a residence

- Location within Connecticut Location within the United States
- Location: East Plymouth and Marsh Road, Plymouth, Connecticut
- Coordinates: 41°41′59″N 72°59′57″W
- Area: 11.5 acres (4.7 ha)
- Architectural style: Greek Revival
- NRHP reference No.: 85000312
- Added to NRHP: February 21, 1985

The East Plymouth Historic District is a historic district in the town of Plymouth, Connecticut, United States. It encompasses a small rural village in the northeastern part of the town, whose main focus is the 1792 St. Matthew's Church, one of the oldest surviving Episcopal church buildings in the state. The district runs along East Plymouth Road on either side of its junction with Marsh Road, and includes predominantly Greek Revival residential buildings erected in the early to mid-19th century. The district was listed on the National Register of Historic Places in 1985.

== Description and history ==
The area that is now East Plymouth was sparsely settled until after the American Revolutionary War. The junction of East Plymouth and Marsh Roads was a minor road junction, that assumed importance with the founding in 1792 of St. Matthew's Church. This church was founded by Plymouth Episcopalians unhappy with a recent decision to build a new church at the western end of the town (now Thomaston), and by Congregationalists of Bristol unhappy with their preacher. The crossroads grew into a small village as parishioners moved to the area, and there were soon a tavern and blacksmith established. The area was dependent on agriculture, and declined economically in the late 19th century, as people moved to find work elsewhere.

The historic district extends along East Plymouth Street, a short distance from its junction with Marsh Road. It includes eight 19th-century houses, as well as the former 1792 St. Matthew's building, converted to a residence. Unfortunately on Friday, August 20th, 2010 it burnt down. That building is of historic significance as one of a small number of surviving 18th-century church buildings in the state. The houses and associated outbuildings are mostly in vernacular versions of the Federal and Greek Revival styles popular in the first half of the 19th century. Some houses remained within ownership of the same families well into the 20th century.

== See also ==
- National Register of Historic Places listings in Litchfield County, Connecticut
