= Moses Dunbar =

- Born: 3 June 1746; Wallingford, Connecticut, British America
- Died: 19 March 1777 (aged 30) Hartford, Connecticut, United States
- Cause of death: Hanging
- Buried: Hartford, Connecticut, United States
- Allegiance: Great Britain
- Service years: 1776
- Children: 7

Moses Dunbar (3 June 1746 – March 19, 1777) was a Connecticut land-owner and officer in a Loyalist regiment during the American Revolutionary War. He was one of the few men in the state of Connecticut to be convicted of high treason and executed. (Note: William Stone of Stamford and Robert Thomson of Newton were two others; they each also were hanged in 1777)

== Early life ==
Moses Dunbar was born in Wallingford, Connecticut on June 3, 1746 to John and Temperance Dunbar, the second of sixteen children. In 1764, Moses married Phebe Jerome of Farmington, Connecticut, with whom he had seven children. Soon after marriage, Moses and Phebe joined the Church of England, causing a rift with Moses' Congregationalist father.

== Involvement in the American Revolution ==
On May 26, 1776, Dunbar's wife Phebe died after months of illness. Dunbar subsequently married Esther Adams. In September, Dunbar traveled to Long Island and in October, he accepted a commission as a Captain in the King's American Regiment, a British provincial regiment which was raised for Loyalist service. He then went back to Farmington, Connecticut, and was trying to persuade some other young men to enlist in the British army when he was arrested, and his royal commission and a list of Loyalist recruits was found in his pocket.

He was indicted for high treason, tried in the superior court in Hartford, Connecticut, and on January 23, 1777, found guilty. on March 19, he was executed on the gallows which stood near the present site of Trinity College. Dunbar is buried in the Ancient Burying ground, in Hartford.
