= Seth Thomas (clockmaker) =

American mass production pioneer (1785–1859)

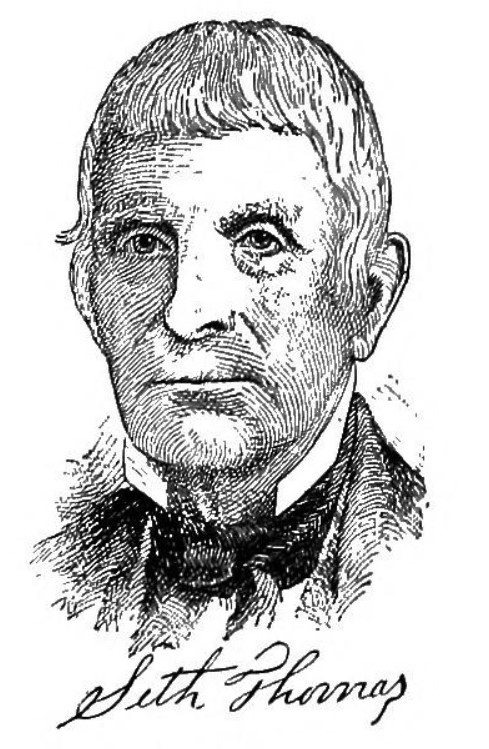
- Born: August 19, 1785; Wolcott, Connecticut, United States
- Died: January 29, 1859 (aged 73); Thomaston, Connecticut, United States
- Resting place: Hillside Cemetery, Thomaston
- Children: 9
- Engineering career
- Projects: Clock at Grand Central Terminal
- Significant advance: Clockmaker and a pioneer of mass production

Seth Thomas (1785 — 1859) was an American clockmaker and a pioneer of mass production at his Seth Thomas Clock Company.

== Biography ==
Thomas was born in Wolcott, Connecticut, in 1785. He was apprenticed as a carpenter and joiner, and worked building houses and barns. He started in the clock business in 1807, working for clockmaker Eli Terry. Thomas formed a clock-making partnership in Plymouth, Connecticut, with Eli Terry and Silas Hoadley as Terry, Thomas & Hoadley.

In 1810, he bought Terry's clock business, making tall clocks with wooden movements, though he chose to sell his partnership in 1812, moving in 1813 to Plymouth Hollow, Connecticut, where he set up a factory to make metal-movement clocks. In 1817, he added shelf and mantel clocks. By the mid-1840s, he changed over to brass from wooden movements. He made the clock that is used in Fireman's Hall. He died in 1859, whereupon the company was taken over by his son, Aaron, who added many styles and improvements after his father's death. The company went out of business in 2009.

== Death and legacy ==
Thomas died on January 29, 1859, in Plymouth Hollow, Connecticut, and was interred at the Hillside Cemetery. In 1875, the town's Plymouth Hollow district was renamed Thomaston in Thomas' memory.

== Gallery ==
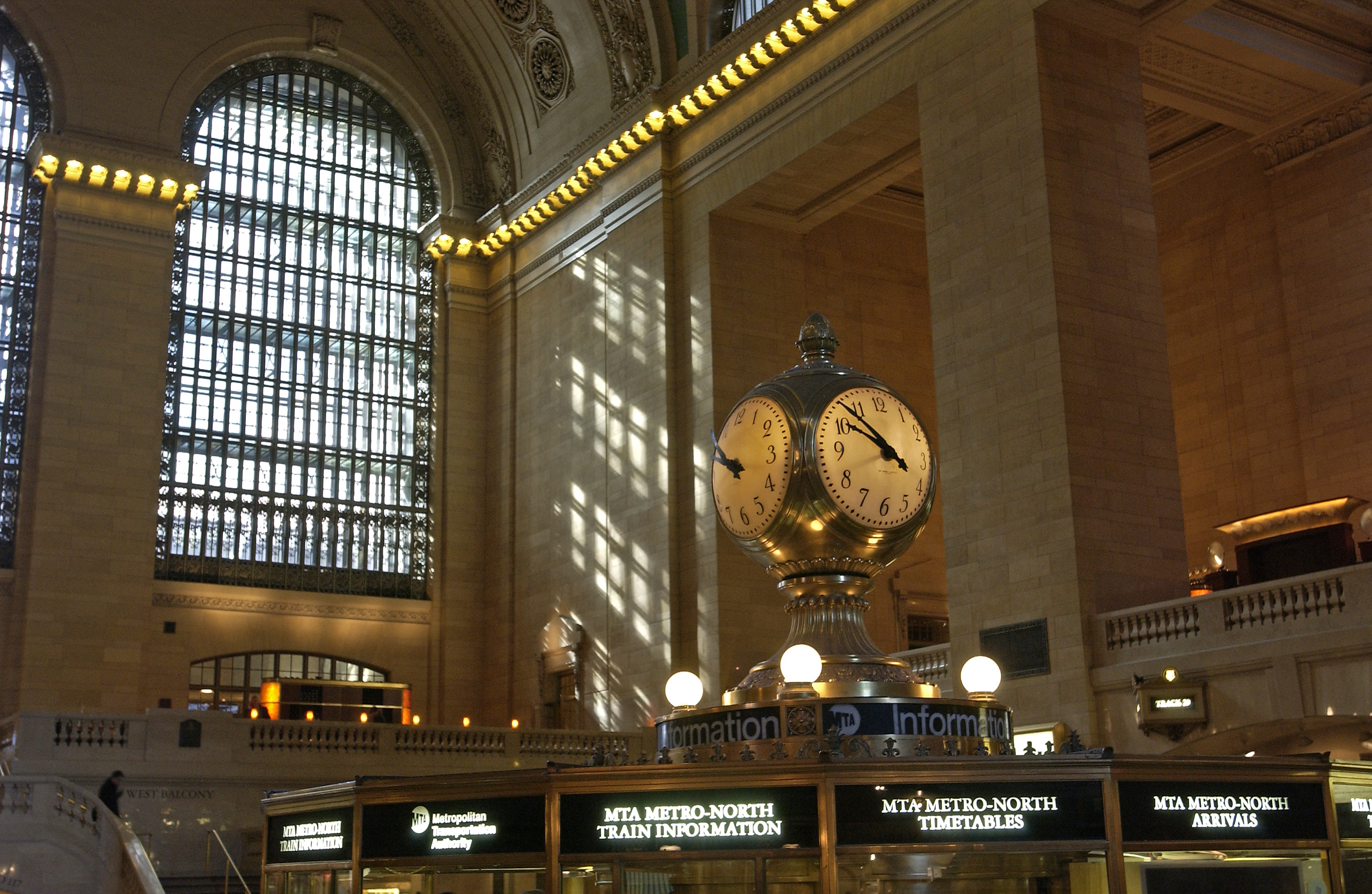
The Seth Thomas Clock Company-manufactured clock at Grand Central Terminal

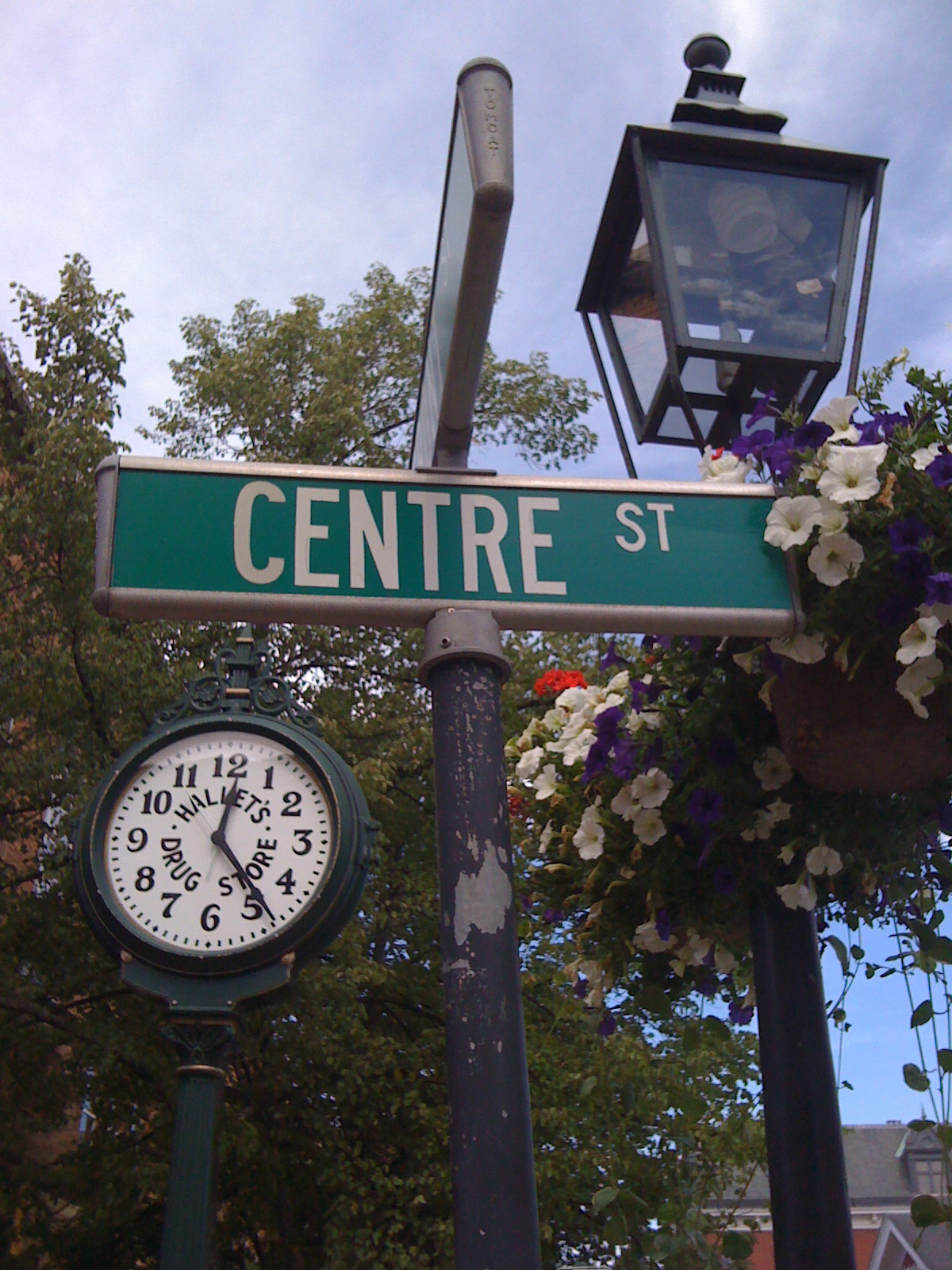
This Thomas clock was built in Boston, Massachusetts, in 1911 and moved to Bath, Maine, in 1915
