= Deane Keller =

Deane Keller could refer to:

- Deane Keller (portraitist), American portraitist
- Deane Keller (draftsman), American draftsman and son of the portraitist
