= Lock Museum of America =

Coordinates: 41.6787°N 73.0109°W

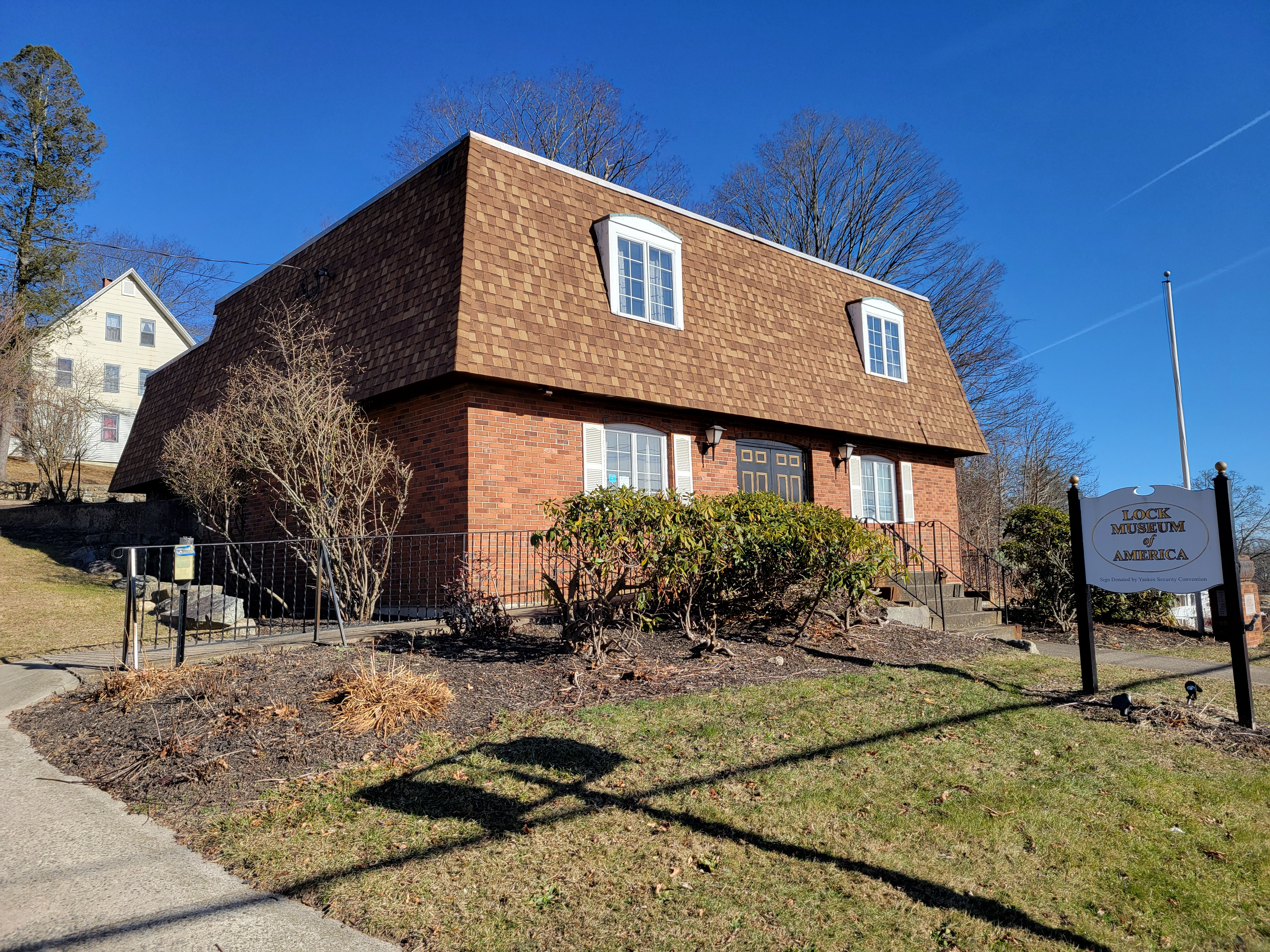
- Lock Museum of America
- Established: 1972
- Location: 230 Main Street; Terryville, Connecticut
- Type: Industry museum
- Website: www.lockmuseumofamerica.org

The Lock Museum of America is a museum about locks and the history of locksmithing in the United States. The museum houses an extensive lock collection that includes 30 early era time locks, escutcheon plates from safes, a large number of British safe locks, door locks, padlocks, handcuffs and keys, and more. Located in Terryville, Connecticut, the museum is directly across from the original site of the Eagle Lock Company, founded in 1854.

== History ==
The museum was founded by locksmith Thomas F. Hennessy, who began collecting locks in 1962. He merged his own collection with that owned by the Eagle Lock Company in 1972 to form the museum. The museum moved to its current location in 1980.

== Collections ==
The museum holds the world's largest collection of locks.

Major collections are displayed by company or theme. The museum has eight rooms, each with a different theme. The Eagle Lock room contains over 1,000 locks and keys manufactured from 1854 to 1954. The Bank Lock Room comprises a selection of bank locks, vault locks, safe locks and time locks. The Corbin-Russwin Room contains a large display of ornate hardware. Several pieces are gold plated and enameled. One of the animated displays shows how a pin tumbler lock works.

The Yale Room accommodates locks manufactured by the Yale Lock company from 1860 to 1950. One of the attractions here is the original patent model of the Mortise Cylinder Pin Tumbler Lock designed by Linus Yale Jr., in 1865. The museum also houses a 4000 year old Egyptian pin-tumbler lock.

The museum also runs a lock themed escape room.
