= Dorothy Bosch Keller =

American arts educator

- Born: Dorothy Jo Bosch; December 30, 1940; Connecticut, U.S.
- Died: October 27, 2025 (age 84); East Hampton, Connecticut, U.S.
- Spouse: Deane Keller
- Relatives: Deane Keller (father-in-law)

Dorothy Jo Bosch Keller (December 30, 1940 – October 27, 2025) was an American art history professor and archaeologist, based in Connecticut. She taught at the University of Saint Joseph in Connecticut from 1967 to 2021.

== Early life and education ==
Bosch was from Terryville, Connecticut, the daughter of Joseph J. Bosch (who died in 1944) and Catherine Dorothy Roskosky Bosch. She graduated from the University of Hartford in 1962, and earned a master's degree in education in 1963. Later in life she earned another master's degree in religious studies, in 1985, from the University of Saint Joseph.

== Career ==
Keller was a professor of art history at the University of Saint Joseph from 1967 to 2021, when she retired with emerita status; she was chair of the fine arts and performing arts department. She worked on archaeological digs in the Middle East and in Africa. In 1995, she accidentally discovered a mortuary temple in Egypt dating to 1290 BC. She led tours as a docent at several museums, including the Metropolitan Museum of Art.

Keller was active in the Wadsworth Atheneum, and in 1984 became an Elector of the museum. She also served on the board of the Hartford Preservation Alliance and as an appointed member of the Marlborough Conservation Commission. She was a member of the Albert Morgan Archeological Society, and made archaeological digs near her home in Marlborough, Connecticut. She lectured to community groups about art education, archaeology, architecture, and art history.

== Personal life ==
Bosh married artist Deane G. Keller in 1969. He died in 2005, and she died in 2025, at the age of 84, in East Hampton, Connecticut.
