= Albert Galloway Keller =

American sociologist (1874–1956)

Albert Galloway Keller (April 10, 1874 – October 31, 1956) was an American sociologist, author, and student and colleague of William Graham Sumner. He is best known as the editor of Sumner's papers, in numerous volumes, published in the early 20th century by the Yale University Press. He was a scholar in his own right and wrote on German colonial policy, economic geography, and sociology.

== Biography ==
Keller came from Springfield, Ohio. He graduated from Yale College in 1896 and received his PhD from Yale University in 1899. He immediately joined the social science faculty there and was appointed professor in 1907, succeeding Sumner, his mentor, and taught there until 1942.

He was the first holder of the "William Graham Sumner Chair of Political Science" at Yale.

Yale's eclectic approach to social science during his time there is illustrated by the Festschrift for Keller which was edited by George Peter Murdock. The volume of essays was created to honor Keller in celebration of his completion of 30 years as a professor. Twenty-six scholars who had studied with him made contributions to that volume.

Professor Keller and his wife, née Caroline Louise Gussman, were the parents of Deane Keller and the grandparents of Deane G. Keller, both artists.

== Selected works ==
- The Beginnings of German Colonization, Yale Review, May 1901.
- The Colonial Policy of the Germans, Yale Review, February 1902.
- Homeric Society: A Sociological Study of the Iliad and the Odyssey, New York: Longmans, Green, and Company, 1902.
- Queries in Ethnography, New York: Longmans, Green, 1903.
- Notes on the Danish West Indies, Annals of the American Academy of Political and Social Science, vol. 22, no. 1, 1903.
- Portuguese Colonization in Brazil, New Haven, 1906.
- Colonization: A Study of the Founding of New Societies, Boston: Ginn & Company, 1908.
- Race Distinction, New Haven: Department of Anthropology, Yale University, 1909.
- The Limits of Eugenics, American Academy of Medicine, New Haven, Conn., November 12, 1909.
- Physical and Commercial Geography: A Study of Certain Controlling Conditions of Commerce, with Herbert Ernest Gregory and Avard Longley Bishop, Boston: Ginn & Company, 1910.
- Commercial and Industrial Geography, with Avard Longley Bishop, Boston: Ginn & Company, 1912.
- Eugenics and its Social Limitations, 1914.
- Societal Evolution: A Study of the Evolutionary Basis of the Science of Society, New York: Macmillan Company, 1915; later editions in 1931 and 1947.
- Industry and Trade: Historical and Descriptive Account of Their Development in the United States, with Avery Longley Bishop, Boston: Ginn & Company, 1918.
- Through War to Peace: A Study of the Great War as an Incident in the Evolution of Society, New York: Macmillan Company, 1918.
- Starting Points in Social Science, Boston: Ginn & Company, 1925.
- Sumner, W.G. and Keller, A.G. (1927), The Science of Society, 4 vols., New Haven: Yale University Press, 1927
  - Volume I (Parts I–III)
  - Volume II (Part IV)
  - Volume III (Parts V–VII)
  - Volume IV (Case-Book, Bibliography, and Index)
- Man's Rough Road: Backgrounds and Bearings From Mankind's Experience, New York: Frederick A. Stokes Company, 1932; a condensed edition of Sumner's, Keller's, and Davie's, The Science of Society; and Reminiscences (mainly personal) of William Graham Sumner; New Haven: Yale University Press, 1933.
- Brass Tacks, New York: Alfred A. Knopf, 1938.
- Net Impressions, New Haven: Yale University Press, 1942.
- "A Byzantine admirer of ‘western’ progress: Cardinal Bessarion", in Cambridge Historical Journal (Cambridge). Vol. 11 (1953–55), pp. 343–348.
