= Terryville, Connecticut =

Census-designated place in Plymouth, Connecticut, US

- Census-designated place
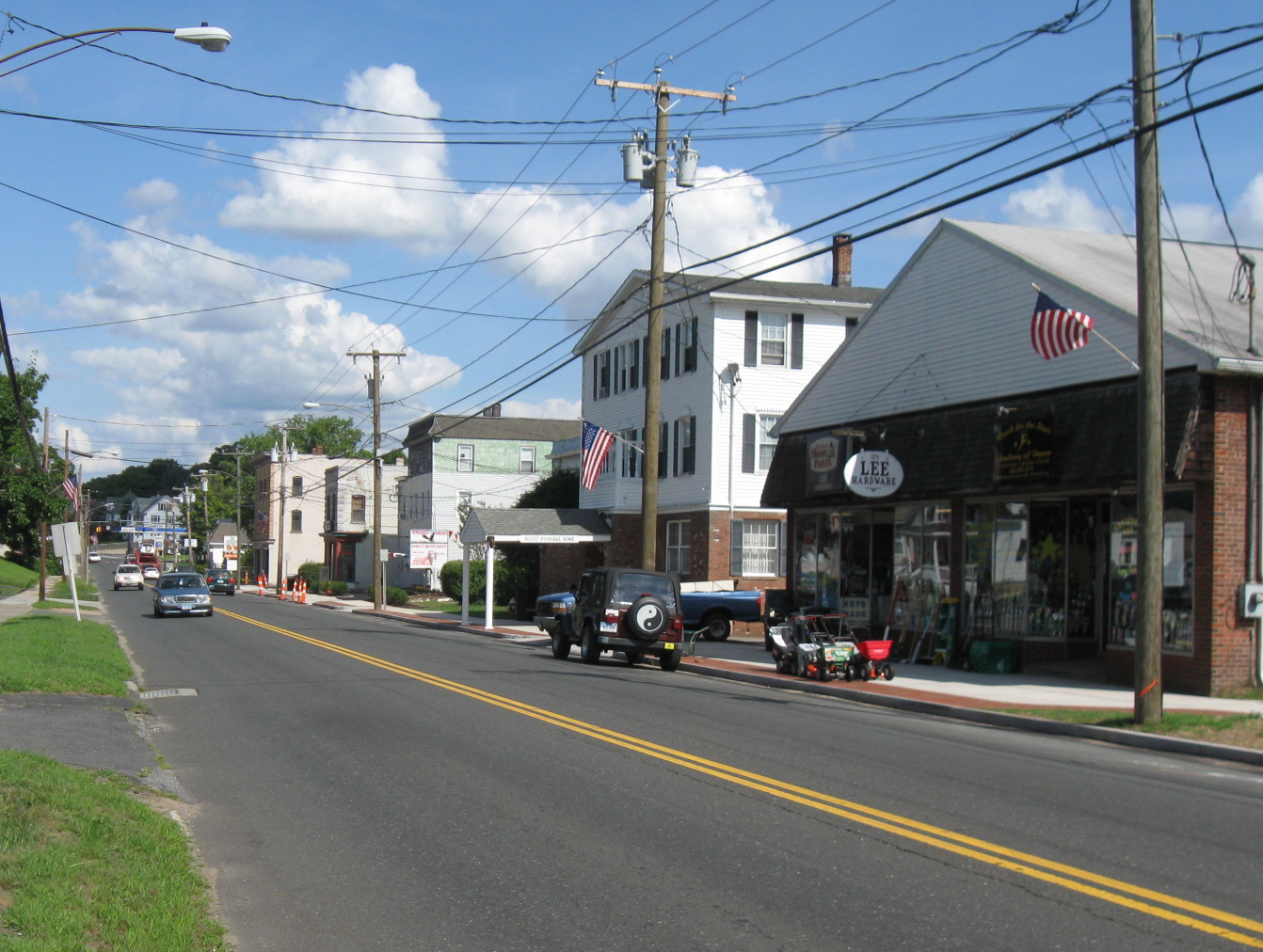
- Main Street (U.S. Route 6) in Terryville

- Location in Litchfield County, Connecticut
- Coordinates: 41°40′41″N 73°0′39″W
- Country: United States
- State: Connecticut
- County: Litchfield
- Town: Plymouth

Area
  - Total: 2.79 sq mi (7.22 km^{2})
  - Land: 2.76 sq mi (7.15 km^{2})
  - Water: 0.027 sq mi (0.07 km^{2})
- Elevation: 615 ft (187 m)

Population (2010)
  - Total: 5,387
  - Density: 1,952/sq mi (753.5/km^{2})
- Time zone: UTC−5 (Eastern)
  - Summer (DST): UTC−4 (Eastern)
- ZIP Code: 06786
- Area code: 860

Terryville is a census-designated place (CDP) in Litchfield County, Connecticut, United States, and is the largest village within the town of Plymouth. As of the 2020 census, Terryville had a population of 5,202. The village is named for Eli Terry Jr., the son of the well-known clockmaker Eli Terry Sr.. Terryville is also home to the Lock Museum of America. There is a water wheel located in downtown Terryville that is dedicated to the son of Eli Terry Sr.

== Geography ==
Terryville is in the eastern part of the town of Plymouth and the southeastern corner of Litchfield County. The community is bordered to the east by the city of Bristol in Hartford County, and it is 10 miles (16 km) north of Waterbury in New Haven County. U.S. Route 6 passes through the center of Terryville, leading east into Bristol and west into Thomaston.

According to the United States Census Bureau, the Terryville CDP has a total area of 2.8 square miles (7.2 km^{2}), of which 0.03 square miles (0.07 km^{2}), or 0.95%, are water. The Pequabuck River, a tributary of the Farmington River, flows from west to east through the center of town.

== Demographics ==
=== 2020 census ===
As of the 2020 census, Terryville had a population of 5,202. The median age was 42.7 years. 18.0% of residents were under the age of 18 and 18.0% of residents were 65 years of age or older. For every 100 females there were 102.8 males, and for every 100 females age 18 and over there were 101.2 males age 18 and over.

100.0% of residents lived in urban areas, while 0.0% lived in rural areas.

There were 2,273 households in Terryville, of which 23.6% had children under the age of 18 living in them. Of all households, 41.8% were married-couple households, 23.1% were households with a male householder and no spouse or partner present, and 24.2% were households with a female householder and no spouse or partner present. About 31.7% of all households were made up of individuals and 13.4% had someone living alone who was 65 years of age or older.

There were 2,398 housing units, of which 5.2% were vacant. The homeowner vacancy rate was 1.1% and the rental vacancy rate was 4.9%.

Racial composition as of the 2020 census
Race	Number	Percent
White	4,536	87.2%
Black or African American	70	1.3%
American Indian and Alaska Native	13	0.2%
Asian	93	1.8%
Native Hawaiian and Other Pacific Islander	7	0.1%
Some other race	85	1.6%
Two or more races	398	7.7%
Hispanic or Latino (of any race)	365	7.0%

=== 2010 census ===
As of the census of 2010, there were 5,387 people, 2,222 households, and 1,426 families residing in the CDP. The population density was 753.5/km^{2} (1,952/mi^{2}). There were 2,406 housing units, of which 7.6% were vacant. The racial makeup of the CDP was 95.1% White, 0.9% African American, 0.3% Native American, 1.1% Asian, 0.04% Native Hawaiian or other Pacific Islander, 0.8% some other race, and 1.8% from two or more races. Hispanic or Latino of any race were 3.4% of the population.

Of the 2,222 households, 30.6% had children under the age of 18 living with them, 48.0% were headed by married couples living together, 10.7% had a female householder with no husband present, and 35.8% were non-families. Of all households, 28.2% were made up of individuals, and 11.3% were someone living alone who was 65 years of age or older. The average household size was 2.42 and the average family size was 2.97.

21.8% of the CDP population were under the age of 18, 8.3% were from 18 to 24, 26.4% were from 25 to 44, 30.8% were from 45 to 64, and 12.6% were 65 years of age or older. The median age was 40.6 years. For every 100 females, there were 95.3 males. For every 100 females age 18 and over, there were 92.6 males.

=== Income and poverty ===
For the period 2013–17, the estimated median annual income for a household in the CDP was $61,324, and the median income for a family was $84,674. Male full-time workers had a median income of $58,929 versus $51,667 for females. The per capita income for the CDP was $33,286. About 4.6% of families and 7.2% of the population were living below the poverty line, including 5.8% of those under age 18 and 4.8% of those age 65 or over.

== Education ==
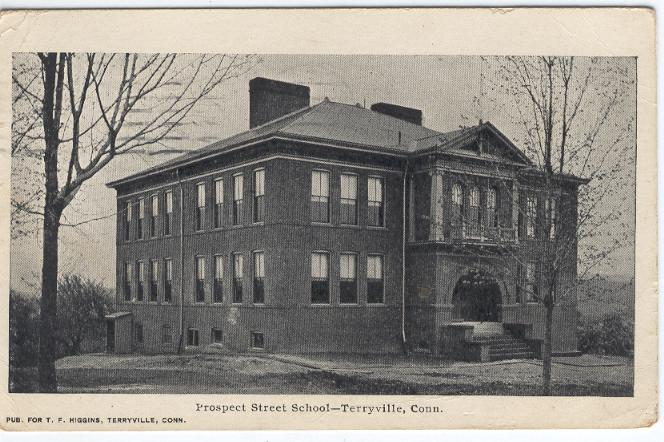
Prospect Street School, c. 1906

It is in the Plymouth School District.

Terryville has four public schools: two pre-K to grade 5 elementary schools, one middle school, and one high school. Its elementary schools are the Harry S. Fisher Elementary School and the Plymouth Center School. Its one middle school is the Eli Terry Middle School. Terryville High School is the only public high school that Plymouth and Terryville residents may attend. A new high school building is located on North Harwinton Avenue in Terryville.

The Prospect Street School was used as the high school up until the 1940s. A new high school building was built on North Main Street and was used until January 2008. Prospect Street School then became an elementary school until its closing in January 2008.

== Notable people ==
- Amethyst, drag queen
- Pete Appleton, Major League Baseball pitcher; born in Terryville
- Dorence Atwater, Civil War hero; United States Consul to Tahiti; prominent businessman; called "Tupuuataroa" (Wise Man) by the people of Tahiti; born in Terryville
- Margaret Miller Cooper, artist
- Betsey Johnson, fashion designer; lived in Terryville until c. 1960
- Dorothy Bosch Keller, art historian from Terryville
- Ted Knight, actor; born in Terryville
