= Eagle Lock Company =

Trunk and cabinet lock manufacturer

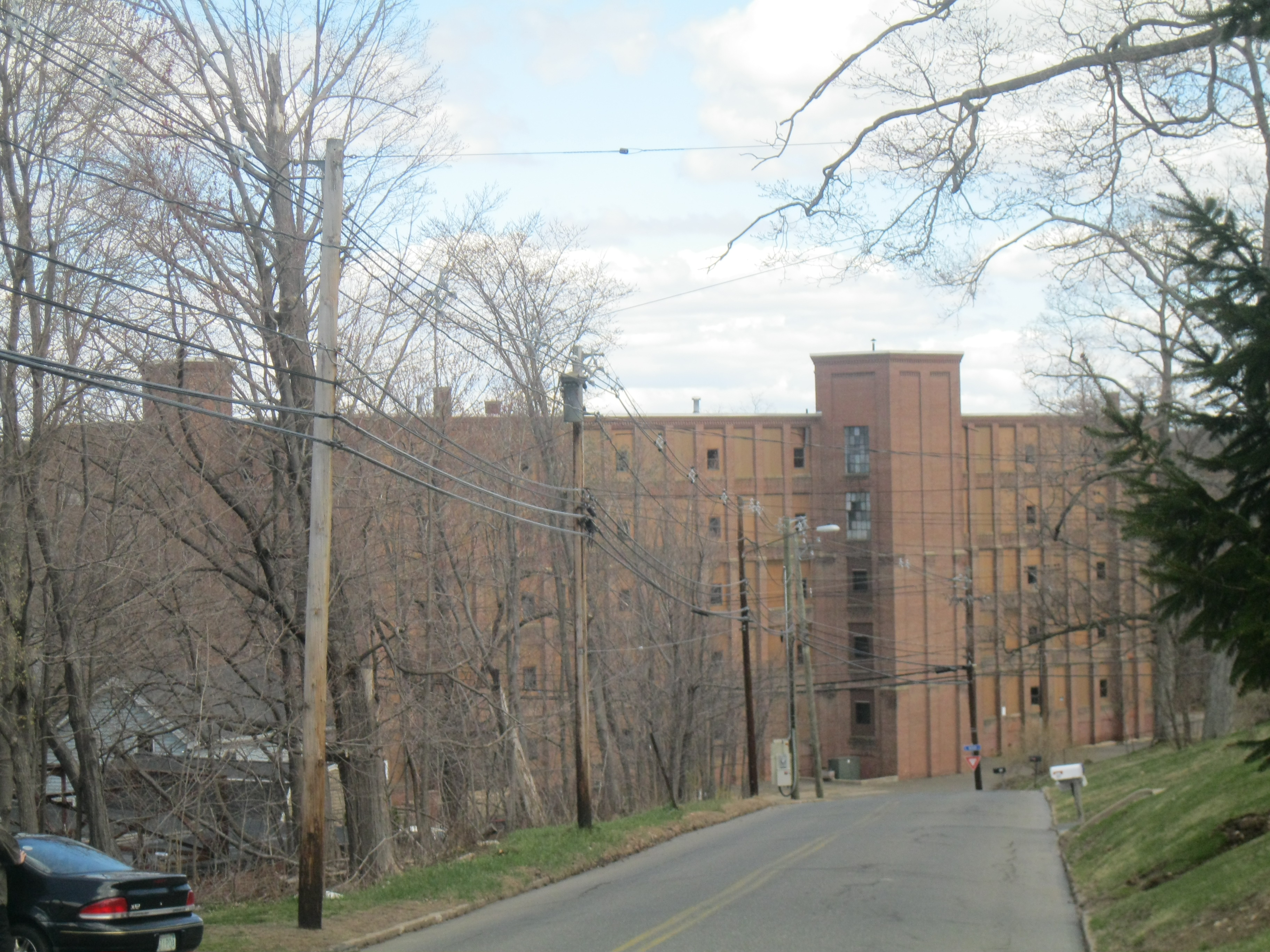
The only building of Eagle Lock Company that was not altered after the fire of 1975.

The Eagle Lock Company (established 1833) was, at one time, the largest trunk and cabinet lock maker in the world. It was based in Terryville, Connecticut. The Eagle Lock Company was at the forefront of padlock security at the time.

== History ==
The Eagle Lock Company was formed by the consolidation of several early nineteenth-century enterprises. The most notable began in 1832, when an English immigrant and locksmith opened a small lock manufacturer in Watertown, Connecticut. This was one of the first American lock works. After two years, his small shop and skills were acquired by the Terryville, Connecticut firm of Lewis, McKee and Company, which was run by Eli Terry, son of the clock maker.

In 1841, after Eli Terry's death, the business was bought by the Lewis and Gaylord Company, and then consolidated in 1854 with the James Terry Company (a maker of carpet bag frames) as the Eagle Lock Company.

Production grew so much that, by the 1890s, the firm was one of the largest trunk lock manufacturers in the world, employing nearly 500 workers. Products included trunk and cabinet locks, as well as high quality security-grade padlocks, and, in the early twentieth century, screw-machine products.

The company experienced precipitous growth with the onset of the First World War, and even greater expansion during the Second World War, nearly doubling the number of employees to 800. With major defense contracts, it became an attractive takeover target for large firms looking to create subsidiary industries. In 1943, with the largest profit margins in company history, Eagle Lock was sold to F. Bowser Inc., of Fort Wayne, Indiana, however it continued to operate under its original name and location in Terryville, Connecticut.

After the War, the board of Eagle Lock deliberated, but never initiated, a move to the southeastern United States for tax purposes. The company’s financial situation began to deteriorate and the company was sold in the 1960s to the Delaware firm of Penn-Akron Corporation. The Eagle Lock Company continued to flounder after the sale, and by the 1970s, faced foreclosure and bankruptcy. While there were attempts to purchase the manufacturing complex, none succeeded, and the company closed in 1975. The majority of the plant was demolished and the land redeveloped.

After the company closed, the employees were honored for over 65 years of work in the town's 175th birthday.

== Factory Complex ==
The Terryville factory had a manufacturing line of over 2000 different kinds of locks. The factory consisted of one main office building, and later in 1889 and 1905, extra work space was added including two five-story buildings on either side of the office. The factory had a boarding house on Prospect Street for male employees, which was torn down in the early 1900s. A sales room was once operated on Chambers Street in New York City.

The lock company housed four ponds including upper pond (now Terryville Fish and Game), middle pond (now privately owned), lower pond (no longer in existence but once held water to power the Eli Terry Waterwheel), and Reservoir One (once filling up all of the land behind the congregational church and along Eagle Street, it was drained and removed after a fire in 1975). The factory had buildings where the Terryville Rite Aid currently is located.

The remnants of the former Eagle Lock Company factory complex are located at the east and west corners of the intersection of South Main and Main Streets in Terryville, Connecticut. It is not known exactly when company first moved to this site, but its location on the Pequabuck River, which runs directly through the site, shows that the original operations were water powered. Today, only four of the buildings out of some 50 remain. Of the four remaining buildings, only one has not been altered, while the other three were disconnected and had floors removed.

The first surviving building is a one story brick production shed with gable roof on the corner of South Main Street and East Orchard Street; this building held such operations as packing, stocking and shipping, buffing and plating and pin-lock production.

The second survivor is a two-story brick power house between East Orchard Street and South Eagle Street; the smokestack has been partially demolished.

The five-story brick loft building on the north side of South Main Street and the south bank of the Pequabuck River was constructed in 1916. To the southeast is a small one-story, storage shed built during the same period. On the north side of the Pequabuck is a one-story brick structure likely constructed during the 1940s.
