= Dorence Atwater =

American soldier and diplomat (1845–1910)

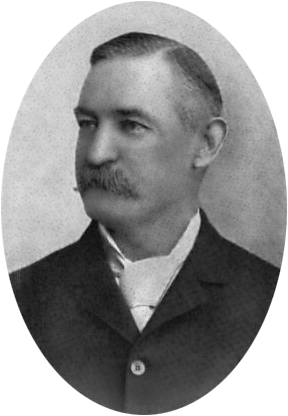
- Born: February 3, 1845; Terryville, Connecticut, US
- Died: November 26, 1910 (aged 65); San Francisco, California, US
- Occupation(s): Union Army soldier, merchant, entrepreneur, diplomat
- Spouse: Princess Moetia Salmon

Dorence Atwater (February 3, 1845 – November 26, 1910) was a Union Army soldier and later a businessman and diplomat who served as the United States Consul to Tahiti.

In July 1863, during the American Civil War, Atwater was captured by the Confederate Army and found himself among the first batch of prisoners at the notorious Andersonville prisoner-of-war camp. He is notable for having created the Andersonville Death Register while imprisoned there, which recorded the identities of his fellow prisoners. He secretly made a copy of his list of the dead and missing which later allowed him, in cooperation with Clara Barton, to mark the graves of otherwise unknown soldiers.

After the Civil War, Atwater was sent to the Seychelles and later Tahiti as a United States Consul. He was a proficient businessman who worked with lepers and other charities and was beloved by the Tahitian people, who named him "Tupuuataroa" (Wise Man).

== Early life ==
Dorence Atwater was born in Terryville, Connecticut, in 1845, the third child of Henry Atwater and Catherine Fenn Atwater. As a child, he worked as a store clerk due to his fine handwriting and aptitude for numbers.

== Civil War ==
Atwater was only sixteen years old when the American Civil War broke out. After listening to a Union recruiter of nationality, Atwater, under the age requirement to serve, lied about his age and joined anyway. Although Henry Atwater hauled his disobedient son to Hartford to confess his lie, Atwater really wanted to go to war. For over two years, he served as a scout, delivered important messages, and was involved in many battles. He wrote to his father informing him how his outfit had destroyed a bridge: "Imagine a body of two-thousand horsemen, each provided with a canteen full of turpentine; when passing over a bridge each man takes his canteen, holds it pointing downward and lets the turpentine run out on the bridge as they ride along. The last man strikes a match and sets fire to it."

=== Prisoner-of-war ===
One morning in July 1863, Atwater was exercising his horse in the woods when he was captured by two Confederates disguised in Yankee uniforms. The Battle of Gettysburg had just occurred, and a new prison named Camp Sumter in southwest Georgia, known to the prisoners as Andersonville and to Atwater as "hell itself", had just opened. Andersonville had a quota of 400 prisoners a day. The Confederates picked up Atwater on their way through Richmond, Virginia, and he was among the first prisoners to be marched to Andersonville.

Atwater was ill when he arrived and was put into the prison hospital. Upon his recovery, his handwriting was discovered again, and he was given the task of keeping the "Death List", a register of those who had died at the camp. He was ordered to produce two copies, one for the Confederates and one which, he was told, would go to the United States federal government. He suspected the Union would never see this copy and decided to keep his own list, hidden among the papers of the ones belonging to the Confederates. All the while, Atwater knew that if the prison leader, Captain Henry Wirz, discovered what he was doing, he would be hanged.

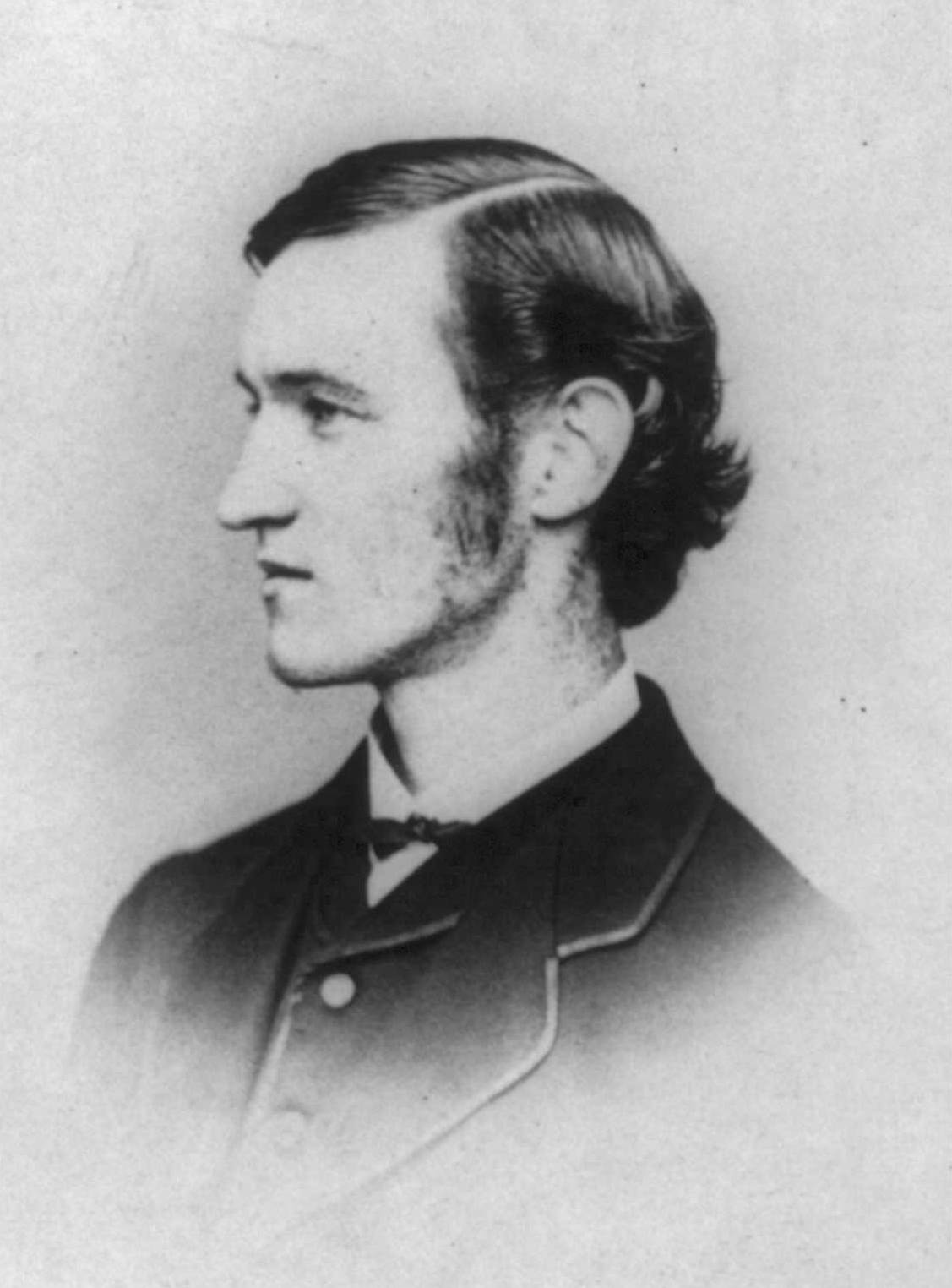
Atwater, c. 1870

In September 1864 the prisoners from Andersonville were transferred to Florence, South Carolina. On February 27, 1865, Atwater was released to Union authorities. He smuggled the list out with him.

=== Returning home ===
Shortly after Atwater arrived home, he pulled the Andersonville death list out of his bag and showed it to his father and siblings. There had been rumors that he had folded it and slipped it in the inner pocket of his coat. But as his brother Richard wrote, "First, the Union coats had no inside pockets, second, Dorence had no coat, and third, the huge, thick list was not folded." Two days later, Atwater came down with diphtheria, typhoid, and scurvy. People rarely survived even one of these diseases, but Atwater did.

Three weeks later, he was thin and weak but on the mend. He had just received a telegram requesting him to come to Washington, D.C. and bring the list. On the train there, word reached him that President Abraham Lincoln had been shot and was dying. Washington, D.C. was in chaos, and Atwater was still quite weak. A telegram then came from home notifying him that his father, who had nursed him through his illnesses, had diphtheria and was also dying. Atwater returned home at the first opportunity. His father died that night.

After handling the funeral, Atwater returned to Washington to begin work as an intern. He was barely 20 years old. There he met Clara Barton, who had the means to mark the Andersonville graves but no names with which to mark them; Atwater told her what she needed to know. This meeting began a lifelong friendship between Atwater and Barton.

=== General service and court-martial ===
Atwater took the death list and traveled with Barton, Dr. James Moore, and 42 headboard carvers to mark the graves of the soldiers who had died at Andersonville. Upon his return to Washington, D.C., he refused to reveal where his list was and was taken to be court-martialed. After lobbying by Barton, Atwater was freed under a general pardon from President Andrew Johnson in December 1865. He was later appointed U.S. Consul to the Seychelles Islands. The death list was eventually published by the federal government and reprinted by The New York Tribune.

== U.S. Consul to Tahiti ==
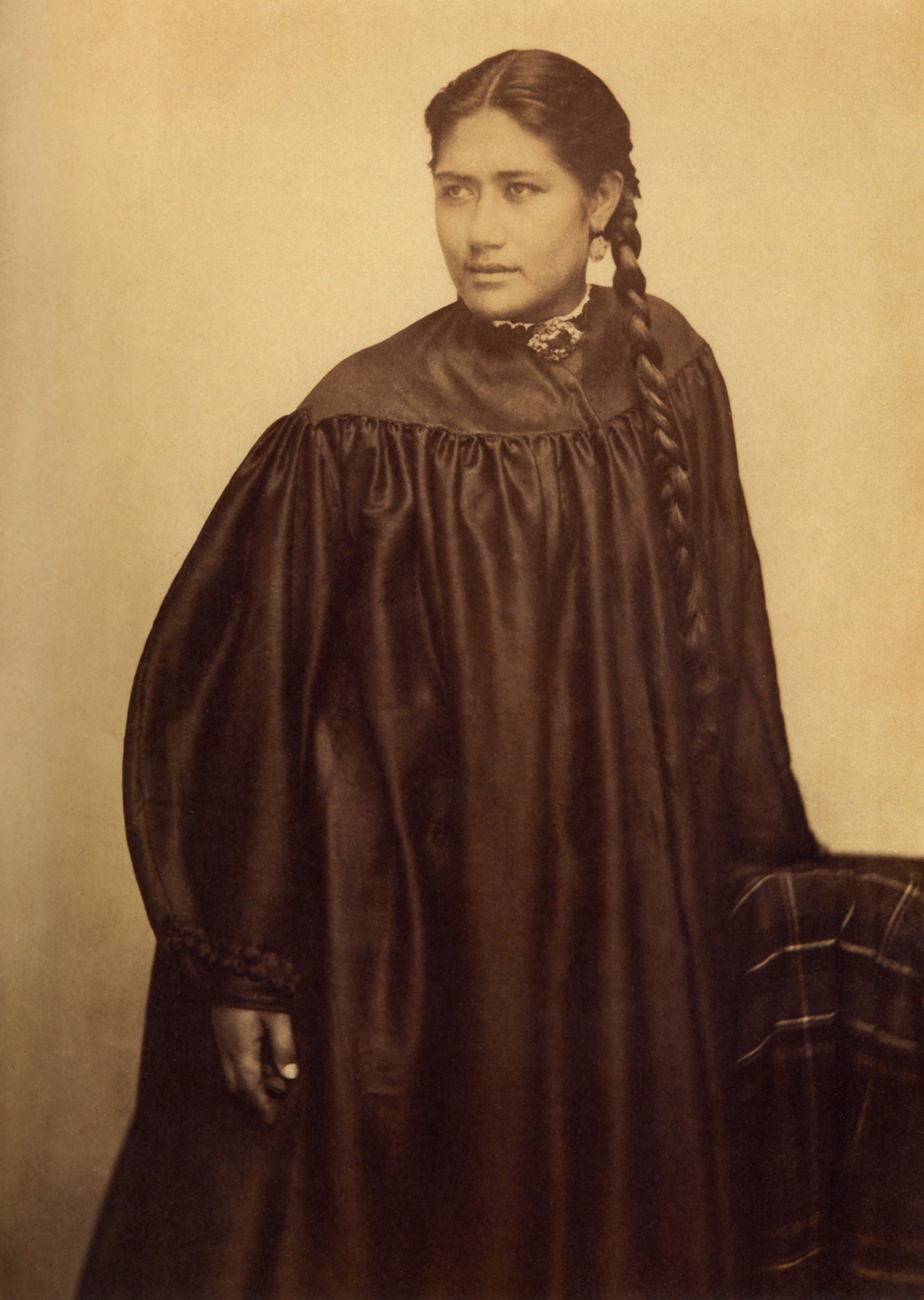
Moetia Salmon Atwater (1848–1935)

After three years, Atwater was sent to be Consul to Tahiti. He was formally recognized as Consul in February 1872. In Tahiti he fell in love with Princess Moetia Salmon, or "Moe", the sister of Queen Marau and the second consort of King Pōmare V of Tahiti. Moetia had been educated in France and England. They were married in 1875.

== Death and legacy ==
Atwater died on November 26, 1910, in San Francisco, at the age of 65.

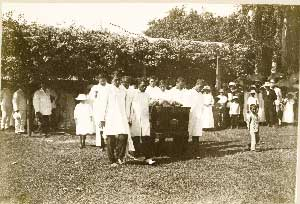
Funeral of Dorence Atwater in Tahiti

He was interred in San Francisco while the royals of Tahiti planned to have his body returned. Atwater was the first non-royal to be given a royal funeral in Tahiti. He was buried beneath a 7000 lb stone. On one side is carved "Tupuuataroa" (Wise Man). On the other side, the inscription reads, "He builded better than he knew that one day he might awake in surprise to found he had wrought a monument more enduring than brass." Princess Moe died in 1935, at the age of 87, and is buried next to Atwater.

== See also ==
- Andersonville National Historic Site
