= Pequabuck River =

Coordinates: 41°43′8.5″N 72°50′20.5″W

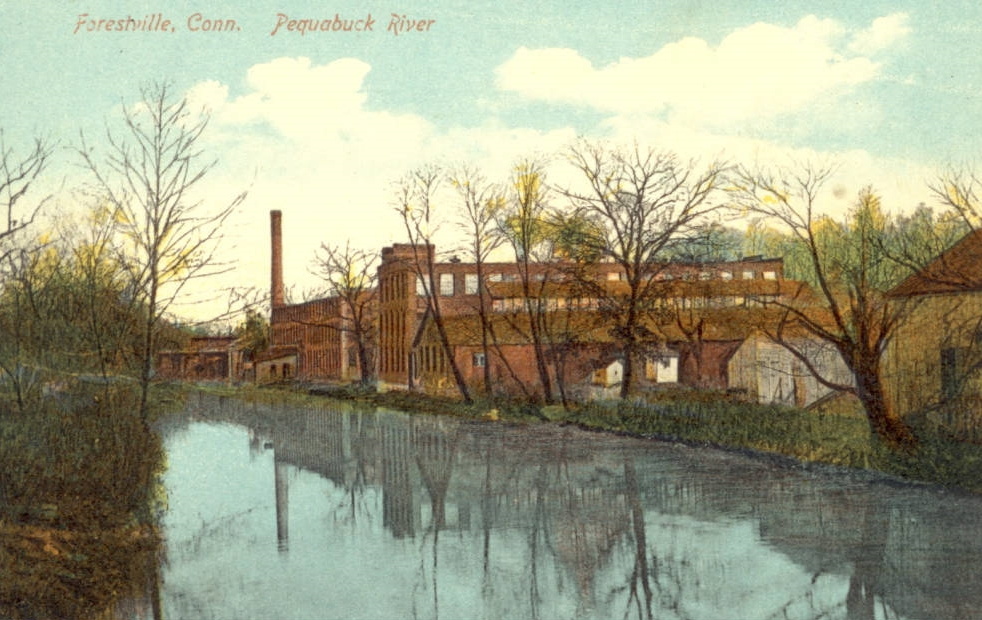
- Early 20th-century postcard portraying the Pequabuck River in Forestville, Connecticut

Location
- Country: United States
- State: Connecticut
- Counties: Litchfield County, Hartford County

Physical characteristics
- Source
  - location: Harwinton, Litchfield County, Connecticut, United States
- Mouth: Confluence with Farmington River
  - location: Farmington, Hartford County, Connecticut, United States
- Length: 19 mi (31 km)
- Basin size: 58.4 mi^{2} (151 km^{2})
- Discharge
  - location: Farmington, Connecticut

Basin features
- Tributaries
  - right: Poland River

The Pequabuck River is a river, approximately 19 miles (30.6 km) in length, which rises in Litchfield County, Connecticut, and courses through neighboring Hartford County before emptying into the Farmington River in Farmington. The river has played a crucial role in the development of Plainville, Connecticut, in particular. The river's lower drainage basin consists of industrial and urban areas, and effluents from these areas pollute the river's waters. The Pequabuck drove a water wheel that provided 8 horsepower to the Upper Lock Shop in Plymouth, Connecticut, a facility which would eventually become the Lewis Lock Company in 1851 and, finally, the once-renowned Eagle Lock Company. The river banks were historically the site of one of United States' first malleable iron-producing units, known as Malleable Iron Works (later Andrew Terry and Company).

== Etymology ==
The name Pequabuck was derived from an indigenous Algonquin phrase meaning "clear pond" or "open pond". It is believed that this term originally referred to a pond or wetland at the headwaters of the Pequabuck River.

== See also ==
- List of rivers of Connecticut
