= William Graham Sumner =

American clergyman and social scientist

The Reverend William Graham Sumner
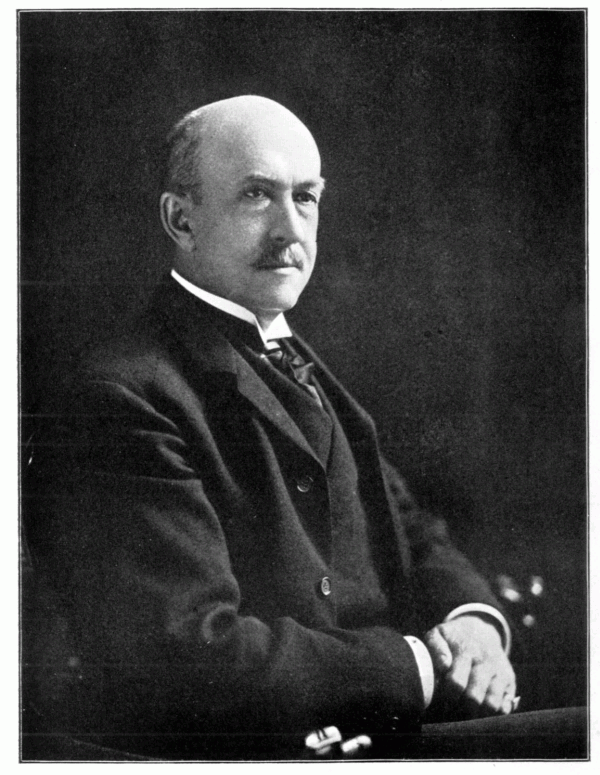
- Born: October 30, 1840; Paterson, New Jersey, U.S.
- Died: April 12, 1910 (aged 69); Englewood, New Jersey, U.S.
- Education: Yale University; University of Geneva; University of Göttingen; University of Oxford
- Occupations: Social scientist, Episcopal priest
- Employer: Yale University
- Notable work: What the Social Classes Owe to Each Other (1883); Folkways (1906)

William Graham Sumner (October 30, 1840 – April 12, 1910) was an American Episcopal priest, social scientist, and neoclassical liberal. He taught social sciences at Yale University, where he held the nation's first professorship in sociology and became one of the most influential teachers at any major school.

Sumner wrote extensively on the social sciences, penning numerous books and essays on ethics, American history, economic history, political theory, sociology, and anthropology. He supported laissez-faire economics, free markets, and the gold standard, in addition to coining the term "ethnocentrism" to identify the roots of imperialism, which he strongly opposed. As a spokesman against elitism, he was in favor of the "forgotten man" of the middle class—a term he coined. He had a prolonged influence on American conservatism.

== Biography ==
Sumner wrote an autobiographical sketch for the fourth of the histories of the Class of 1863 Yale College. In 1925, the Rev. Harris E. Starr, class of 1910 Yale Department of Theology, published the first full-length biography of Sumner. A second full-length biography by Bruce Curtis was published in 1981.

=== Early life and education ===
Sumner was born in Paterson, New Jersey, on October 30, 1840. His father, Thomas Sumner, was born in England and immigrated to the United States in 1836. His mother, Sarah Graham, was also born in England. She was brought to the United States in 1825 by her parents. Sumner's mother died when he was eight.

In 1841, Sumner's father went prospecting as far west as Ohio, but came back east to New England and settled in Hartford, Connecticut, in about 1845. Sumner wrote about his high regard for his father: "His principles and habits of life were the best possible." Earlier in his life, Sumner said, he accepted from others "views and opinions" different from his father's. However, "at the present time," Sumner wrote, "in regard to those matters, I hold with him and not with the others." Sumner did not name the "matters."

Sumner was educated in the Hartford public schools. After graduation, he worked for two years as a clerk in a store before going to Yale College, graduating in 1863. Sumner achieved an impressive record at Yale as a scholar and orator. He was elected to Phi Beta Kappa society in his junior year and in his senior year to the secretive Skull and Bones society.

Sumner avoided being drafted to fight in the American Civil War by paying a "substitute" $250, given to him by a friend, to enlist for three years. This and money given to him by his father and friends allowed Sumner to go to Europe for further studies. He spent his first year in the University of Geneva studying Latin and Hebrew and the following two years in the University of Göttingen studying ancient languages, history and Biblical science. All told, in his formal education Sumner learned Hebrew, Greek, Latin, French, and German. In addition, after middle age he taught himself Dutch, Spanish, Portuguese, Italian, Russian, Polish, Danish, and Swedish.

In May 1866, he went to Oxford University to study theology. At Oxford, Henry Thomas Buckle planted the sociology seed in Sumner's mind. However, Herbert Spencer was to have the "dominating influence upon Sumner's thought."

=== Tutor, clergyman and professor ===
Except for a stint as a clergyman, Sumner's whole career was spent at Yale.

While at Oxford, Sumner was elected a tutor in mathematics. He was made a lecturer in Greek at Yale, beginning in September 1867.

On December 27, 1867, at Trinity Church, New Haven, Sumner was ordained a deacon in the Episcopal Church. In March 1869, Sumner resigned his Yale tutorship to become assistant to the rector of Calvary Episcopal Church (Manhattan). In July 1869, Sumner was ordained as a priest.

From September 1870 to September 1872, Sumner was rector of the Church of the Redeemer in Morristown, New Jersey. On April 17, 1871, he married Jeannie Whittemore Elliott, daughter of Henry H. Elliott of New York City. They had three boys: one died in infancy, Eliot (Yale 1896) became an officer of the Pennsylvania Railroad; Graham (Yale 1897) became a lawyer in New York City.

Robert Bierstedt writes that Sumner preached two sermons every Sunday at the Church of the Redeemer. They "stressed without surcease the Puritan virtues of hard work, self-reliance, self-denial, frugality, prudence, and perseverance". Furthermore, writes Bierstedt, "it may be said that Sumner spent his entire life as a preacher of sermons". However, Sumner "preferred the classroom to the pulpit", so he left the ministry and returned to Yale in 1872 as "professor of political and social science" until he retired in 1909. Sumner taught the first course in North America called "sociology".

Other than what he said in the ordination service, there is no information about what motivated Sumner to be ordained. At his ordination, Sumner said that he thought that he was "truly called" to the ministry.

Sumner did not make known, at least publicly, his reasons for leaving the ministry. However, he and historians suggest that it might have been a loss of belief and/or a dim view of the church and its clergy.

Clarence J. Karier says, "Sumner found that his deity vanished with the years." "I have never discarded beliefs deliberately", Sumner said later in life, but "I left them in a drawer and, after a while, when I opened it there was nothing there at all." Harris E. Starr found that Sumner "never attacked religion" or "assumed a controversial attitude toward it." At the same time, Starr found that during Sumner's time as a professor he stopped attending Trinity Church, New Haven, where he had been ordained deacon. After that, Sumner attended church only occasionally. However, in the closing years of his life, he baptized a little grandson, and not long before his death he attended New Haven's St. John's Church to receive Holy Communion. Starr wrote that these two events "suggest that deep down in his nature a modicum of religion remained."

In his book What Social Classes Owe to Each Other (1883), Sumner argued that the "ecclesiastical prejudice in favor of the poor and against the rich" worked "to replunge Europe into barbarism." Furthermore, Sumner asserted, this prejudice still lives, nourished by the clergy. "It is not uncommon," he said, "to hear a clergyman utter from the pulpit all the old prejudice in favor of the poor and against the rich, while asking the rich to do something for the poor; and the rich comply."

For exact and comprehensive knowledge Professor Sumner is to take the first place in the ranks of American economists; and as a teacher he has no superior.

The Yale University Library's guide to Sumner's papers ranks him as "Yale's most dynamic teacher of the late nineteenth and early twentieth centuries. Students clamored to enroll in his classes." Sumner's "genuine love for aspiring students, commanding personality, wide learning, splendid dogmatism, and mastery of incisive English" makes it easy to understand his reputation.

Sumner himself described his life as a professor as "simple and monotonous." "No other life could have been so well suited to my taste as this," he wrote in his autobiographical sketch.

In spite of Sumner's description of his life as "simple and monotonous," he was "a champion of academic freedom and a leader in modernizing Yale's curriculum." This led Sumner into conflict with Yale's president, Noah Porter who, in 1879, asked Sumner not to use Herbert Spencer's Study of Sociology in his classes. "Sumner saw this as a threat to academic freedom and bluntly refused Porter's request. The faculty soon split into two factions one supporting and the other opposing Sumner's defiance." Sumner stood his ground and won out.

Until his 1890 illness, Sumner wrote and spoke constantly on the economic and political issues of the day. His "acidic style" outraged his opponents, but it pleased his supporters. The rest of Sumner's life at Yale was routine. In 1909, the year of his retirement, Yale awarded Sumner an honorary degree.

Although Sumner was a professor of political science, his actual involvement in politics was limited to two things he reported in his autobiographical sketch. In 1873–1876, he served as an alderman in New Haven. In 1876, researching the contested presidential election, he went with a group to Louisiana to find "what kind of a presidential election they had that year." Sumner said that was his "whole experience in politics." From this experience, he concluded, "I did not know the rules of the game and did not want to learn."

=== Retirement and death ===
Sumner's health deteriorated steadily beginning in 1890, and after 1909, the year of his retirement, it "declined precipitously." In December 1909, while in New York to deliver his presidential address to the American Sociological Society, Sumner suffered his third and fatal paralytic stroke. He died April 12, 1910, in Englewood Hospital in New Jersey.

Sumner spent much of his career as a muckraker, exposing what he saw as faults in society, and as a polemicist, writing, teaching, and speaking against these faults. In spite of his efforts, his career ended with pessimism about the future. Sumner said, "I have lived through the best period of this country's history. The next generations are going to see wars and social calamities."

== Economics ==
Sumner was a staunch advocate of laissez-faire economics, as well as "a forthright proponent of free trade and the gold standard and a foe of socialism." Sumner was active in the intellectual promotion of free-trade classical liberalism. He heavily criticized state socialism/state communism. One adversary he mentioned by name was Edward Bellamy, whose national variant of socialism was set forth in Looking Backward, published in 1888, and the sequel Equality.

== Anti-imperialism ==
Like many classical liberals at the time, including Edward Atkinson, Moorfield Storey, and Grover Cleveland, Sumner opposed the Spanish–American War and the subsequent U.S. effort to quell the insurgency in the Philippines. He was a vice president of the Anti-Imperialist League which had been formed after the war to oppose the annexation of territories. In 1899 he delivered a speech titled "The Conquest of the United States by Spain" before the Phi Beta Kappa Society of Yale University. In what is considered by some to be "his most enduring work," he lambasted imperialism as a betrayal of the best traditions, principles, and interests of the American people and contrary to America's own founding as a state of equals, where justice and law "were to reign in the midst of simplicity." In this ironically titled work, Sumner portrayed the takeover as "an American version of the imperialism and lust for colonies that had brought Spain the sorry state of his own time." According to Sumner, imperialism would enthrone a new group of "plutocrats," or businesspeople who depended on government subsidies and contracts.

== Sociologist ==
As a sociologist, his major accomplishments were developing the concepts of diffusion, folkways, and ethnocentrism. Sumner's work with folkways led him to conclude that attempts at government-mandated reform were useless.

In 1876, Sumner became the first to teach a course titled "sociology" in the English-speaking world. The course focused on the thought of Auguste Comte and Herbert Spencer, precursors of the formal academic sociology that would be established 20 years later by Émile Durkheim, Max Weber, and others in Europe. He served as the second president of American Sociological Association from 1908 to 1909 and succeeded his longtime ideological opponent Lester F. Ward.

In 1880, Sumner was involved in one of the first cases of academic freedom. Sumner and the Yale president at the time, Noah Porter, did not agree on the use of Herbert Spencer's "Study of Sociology" as part of the curriculum. Spencer's application of supposed "Darwinist" ideas to the realm of humans may have been slightly too controversial at that time of curriculum reform. On the other hand, even if Spencer's ideas were not generally accepted, it is clear that his social ideas influenced Sumner in his written works.

== Sumner and social Darwinism ==
William Graham Sumner was influenced by many people and ideas. Comparison of his thought with that of Herbert Spencer (for example) has led many to associate Sumner with social Darwinism.

In 1881, Sumner wrote an essay titled "Sociology." In the essay, Sumner focused on the connection between sociology and biology. He explained that there are two sides to the struggle for survival of a human. The first side is a "struggle for existence," which is a relationship between man and nature. The second side would be the "competition for life," which can be identified as a relationship between man and man. The first is a biological relationship with nature and the second is a social link, thus sociology. Man would struggle against nature to obtain essential needs such as food or water and in turn this would create the conflict between man and man in order to obtain needs from a limited supply. Sumner believed that man could not abolish the law of "survival of the fittest," and that humans could only interfere with it and in so doing, produce the "unfit."

According to Jeff Riggenbach, the identification of Sumner as a social Darwinist:

... is ironic, for he was not so known during his lifetime or for many years thereafter. Robert C. Bannister, the Swarthmore historian, ... describes the situation: "Sumner's 'social Darwinism,'" he writes, "although rooted in controversies during his lifetime, received its most influential expression in Richard Hofstadter['s] Social Darwinism in American Thought," which was first published in 1944. ... Was William Graham Sumner an advocate of "social Darwinism"? As I have indicated, he has been so described, most notably by Richard Hofstadter and various others over the past 60-odd years. Robert Bannister calls this description "more caricature than accurate characterization" of Sumner, however, and says further that it "seriously misrepresents him." He notes that Sumner's short book, What Social Classes Owe to Each Other, which was first published in 1884, when the author was in his early 40s, "would ... earn him a reputation as the Gilded Age's leading 'social Darwinist,'" though it "invoked neither the names nor the rhetoric of Spencer or Darwin."

—

Historian Mike Hawkins argues that it is accurate to describe Sumner as a social Darwinist because Sumner draws directly upon evolutionary theory to explain society and dictate policy.

Nicolaus Mills compares later corporate Darwinism with the social Darwinism of Sumner, John D. Rockefeller and Andrew Carnegie.

Sumner was a critic of natural rights, arguing:

Before the tribunal of nature a man has no more right to life than a rattlesnake; he has no more right to liberty than any wild beast; his right to pursuit of happiness is nothing but a license to maintain the struggle for existence ...

— William Graham Sumner, Earth-hunger, and other essays, p. 234.

== Warfare ==
Another example of social Darwinist influence in Sumner's work was his analysis of warfare in one of his essays in the 1880s. Contrary to some beliefs, Sumner did not believe that warfare was a result of primitive societies; he suggested that "real warfare" came from more developed societies. It was believed that primitive cultures would have war as a "struggle for existence," but Sumner believed that war in fact came from a "competition for life." Although war was sometimes man against nature, fighting another tribe for their resources, it was more often a conflict between man and man, for example, one man fighting against another man because of their different ideologies. Sumner explained that the competition for life was the reason for war and that is why war has always existed and always will.

== "The Forgotten Man" ==
The theme of "the forgotten man" was developed by Sumner over a series of 11 essays published in 1883 in Harper's Weekly, and further developed in two speeches delivered that year. Sumner argued that, in his day, politics was being subverted by those proposing a "measure of relief for the evils which have caught public attention." He wrote:

As soon as A observes something which seems to him to be wrong, from which X is suffering, A talks it over with B, and A and B then propose to get a law passed to remedy the evil and help X. Their law always proposes to determine what C shall do for X or, in the better case, what A, B and C shall do for X. ... [W]hat I want to do is to look up C. ... I call him the Forgotten Man. Perhaps the appellation is not strictly correct. He is the man who never is thought of. He is the victim of the reformer, social speculator and philanthropist, and I hope to show you before I get through that he deserves your notice both for his character and for the many burdens which are laid upon him.

Sumner's "forgotten man" and its relationship to Franklin Roosevelt's "forgotten man" is the subject of Amity Shlaes's The Forgotten Man.

== Legacy ==
Sumner's popular essays gave him a wide audience for his laissez-faire advocacy of free markets, anti-imperialism, and the gold standard. Sumner had a long-term influence over modern American conservatism as a leading intellectual of the Gilded Age.

Thousands of Yale students took his courses, and many remarked on his influence. His essays were very widely read among intellectuals, and men of affairs. Among Sumner's students were the anthropologist Albert Galloway Keller, the economist Irving Fisher, and the champion of an anthropological approach to economics Thorstein Bunde Veblen.

The World War II Liberty Ship SS William G. Sumner was named in his honor.

Yale University has maintained a professorship named in Sumner's honor. The following have been the William Graham Sumner Professor of Sociology at Yale University:

- 1909–1942: Albert Galloway Keller (1874–1956)
- 1942–1954: Maurice Rae Davie (1914–1975)
- 1963–1970: August Hollingshead (1907–1980)
- 1970–1993: Albert J. Reiss Jr. (1922–2006)
- 1999–2009: Iván Szelényi
- 2011–2015: Richard Breen

== Works ==
Sumner's works number "around 300 items" including books and articles on "economics, political science and sociology."

Books and pamphlets

- The Books of the Kings (Scribner, Armstrong & Co, 1872) Sumner wrote section on 2 Kings.
- A History of American Currency: with chapters on the English bank restriction and Austrian paper money: to which is appended "The bullion report" (New York: H. Holt and Co., 1874)
- What Social Classes Owe to Each Other (New York: Harper and Bros., 1883)
- Protection and revenue in 1877: a lecture delivered before the "New York Free Trade Club," April 18, 1878 (New York: G.P. Putnam's Sons, 1878)
- Our Revenue System and the Civil Service: Shall They Be Reformed? (New York: G.P. Putnam's Sons, 1878)] contains preface by Sumner.
- Bimetalism: from the Princeton Review, 1879
- Andrew Jackson as a Public Man (Boston and New York: Houghton, Mifflin and Company, 1882)
- Lectures on the History of Protection in the United States: delivered before the International Free-Trade Alliance (New York: G.P. Putnam's Sons, 1883)
- Problems in Political Economy (New York: H. Holt and Company, 1883)
- Protectionism: the -ism Which Teaches that Waste Makes Wealth (New York: H. Holt and Company, 1885)
- Collected Essays in Political and Social Science (New York: Henry Holt and company, 1885)
- Alexander Hamilton (New York: Dodd, Mead and Co., 1890)
- The Financier & the Finances of the American Revolution, Vol 1 (New York: Dodd, Mead, and Co., 1891)
- The Financier & the Finances of the American Revolution, Vol 2 (New York: Dodd, Mead, and Co., 1891)
- Robert Morris (New York: Dodd, Mead, and Co., 1892). Morris' life adapted from The Financier & the Finances of the American Revolution
- A History of Banking in all the Leading Nations, Vol. 1, edited by the editor of the Journal of Commerce and Commercial Bulletin (New York: The Journal of Commerce, 1896).
- The Conquest of the United States by Spain: a lecture before the Phi Beta Kappa Society of Yale University, January 16, 1899 (Boston: Dana Estes, 1899).
- The Predominant Issue: Reprinted from The International Monthly, November 1900 (Burlington, VT, The International Monthly, 1901)
- Folkways: a study of the sociological importance of usages, manners, customs, mores, and morals (Boston: Ginn and Co., 1906)
- Address of William Graham Sumner (New York: Reform Club Committee on Tariff Reform, June 2, 1906)
- The Science of Society, with Albert G. Keller, Vol. 1 (New Haven: Yale University Press, 1927; London: H. Milford, Oxford University Press, 1927)
- The Science of Society, with Albert G. Keller, Vol. 2 (New Haven: Yale University Press, 1927; London: H. Milford, Oxford University Press, 1927)
- The Science of Society, with Albert G. Keller, Vol. 3 (New Haven: Yale University Press, 1927; London: H. Milford, Oxford University Press, 1927)
- The Science of Society, with Albert G. Keller and Maurice Rea Davie, Vol .4 (New Haven: Yale University Press, 1927; London: H. Milford, Oxford University Press, 1927)

Collected Essays

- War, and other essays, ed. Albert Galloway Keller (New Haven: Yale University Press, 1911). Keller's "Introduction" contains a verbal portrait of Sumner.
- Earth Hunger and Other Essays, ed. Albert Galloway Keller (New Haven, Yale University, 1913)
- The Challenge of Facts: and Other Essays, ed. Albert Galloway Keller (New Haven: Yale University Press, 1914)
- The Forgotten Man, and Other Essays ed. Albert Galloway Keller (New Haven, Yale University Press, 1918)
- Selected Essays of William Graham Sumner, eds. Albert Galloway Keller and Maurice R. Davie (New Haven: Yale University Press, 1934)
- Sumner Today: Selected Essays of William Graham Sumner, with Comments by American leaders, ed. Maurice R. Davie (New Haven: Yale University Press, 1940)
- The Forgotten Man's Almanac Rations of Common Sense from William Graham Sumner , ed. A.G. Keller (New Haven: Yale University Press London, H. Milford, Oxford University Press,1943)
- Social Darwinism: Selected Essays of William Graham Sumner, ed. Stow Persons (Englewood Cliff, N.J.: Prentice-Hall, 1963).
- The Conquest of the United States by Spain, and Other essays ed. Murray Polner (Chicago: Henry Regnery, 1965)
- On Liberty, Society, and Politics: The Essential Essays of William Graham Sumner, ed. Robert C. Bannister (Indianapolis: Liberty Fund, 1992)

Periodical Publications (not in collections)

- "The Crisis of the Protestant Episcopal Church", The Nation 13 (October 5, 1871): 22–23
- "The Causes of the Farmer's Discontent", The Nation 16 (June 5, 1873): 381–382
- "Monetary Development", 1875, Harper's 51:304.
- "Professor Walker on bi-Metallism", The Nation 26 (February 7, 1878): 94–96
- "Socialism", Scribner's Monthly 16:6 (1878): 887–893.
- "Protective Taxes and Wages", North American Review 136 (1883): 270–276
- "The Survival of the Fittest:" Index n.s. 4 (May 29, 1884): 567 (June 19, 1884), 603–604
- "Evils of the Tariff System", North American Review 139 (1884): 293–299
- "The Indians in 1887", Forum 3 (May 1887): 254–262
- "The Proposed Dual Organization of Mankind", Popular Science Monthly 49 (1896): 433–439
- "Suicidal Fanaticism in Russia", Popular Science Monthly 60 (1902): 442–447
- "The Bequests of the Nineteenth Century to the Twentieth", Yale Review 22 (1933 [written 1901]), 732–754
- "Modern Marriage", Yale Review 13 (1924): 249–275.

== See also ==
- H.L. Mencken
