= Deane Keller (portraitist) =

American artist and academic

- Deane Keller while a U.S. Army captain, c. 1945
- Born: December 14, 1901; New Haven, Connecticut
- Died: April 12, 1992 (aged 90); Hamden, Connecticut
- Resting place: New Britain, Connecticut, Pisa, Italy
- Education: Yale University
- Known for: Portraiture
- Style: Traditional
- Awards: Prix de Rome (1926); Legion of Merit (1946); British Empire Medal (1945)

Deane Keller BEM (December 14, 1901 – April 12, 1992) was an American artist, academic, soldier, art restorer, and preservationist. He taught for forty years at Yale University's School of Fine Arts, and during World War II was an officer with the Monuments, Fine Arts, and Archives program.

== Biography ==
Keller was born in New Haven, Connecticut in 1901. His father, Albert Galloway Keller, was a member of the junior faculty at Yale, but during young Deane's formative years, his father would become the first William Graham Sumner Professor of Sociology. Keller attended the Taft School in Watertown, Connecticut, graduating in 1919.

As a student at Yale, he earned degrees in history and science in 1923. Further studies led to a B.F.A. from the Yale School of Fine Arts in 1926. Keller was awarded the Gran Prix de Rome in 1926. He was a Fellow of the American Academy in Rome (FAAR) for three years. During his time in Rome, he painted a portrait of sculptor Joseph Kiselewski, who was a Fellow at the same time. After returning from Rome in 1929, Keller began his career as a member of the Yale faculty.

His academic career was interrupted by the Second World War, when he was asked by School of Fine Arts dean Theodore Sizer to serve as a fine arts officer in the U.S. Army's Monuments, Fine Arts, and Archives program. At war's end, he returned to teach at Yale's School of Fine Arts. In total, Keller taught at Yale for forty years, retiring in 1979, and was also professor emeritus of painting at the Paier College of Art.

Keller married Katherine Parkhurst Hall in 1938. He had two sons, Deane G. Keller, 1940 – 2005, and William Keller, born in 1950.

== World War II ==
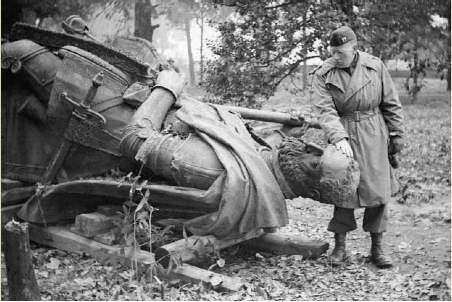
Keller with the Cosimo I de Medici statue, which was recovered in Poggio a Caiano, Italy

From 1943 to 1946, Keller served as an officer of the U.S. 5th Army in the Monuments, Fine Arts, and Archives program. Captain Keller was primarily responsible for the identification and transportation of artworks in Tuscany, Italy, the center of the Italian Renaissance and a major site of Nazi looting. He worked in Pisa and Florence, where Nazi troops had bombed churches, destroyed or dislocated public art, and seized paintings from museums including the Uffizi. As they were discovered during the invasion of Italy, Keller repatriated lost works, including Giambologna's statue of Cosimo I de Medici, a fixture of Florence's Piazza della Signoria. He also documented damage to buildings and murals across Tuscany, taking thousands of photographs with Charles Bernholz.

One of Keller's most significant wartime undertakings was his attempt to preserve the murals of the Camposanto, a medieval cemetery in Pisa. In July 1944, an American shelling started a fire that caused the frescoes to fracture. Keller organized art experts and enlisted men to protect the mural pieces and protect the cemetery from further damage. Restoration of the frescoes has continued for seventy years. In recognition of his preservation efforts, an urn containing Keller's ashes was interred in the Camposanto in 2000.

== Honors ==
- Gran Prix de Rome, 1926
- Legion of Merit, 1946 (United States)
- British Empire Medal, 1926 (United Kingdom)
- Crown of Italy Partisan Medal, 1946 (Italy)
- Medal of the Opera, Commune of Pisa
- Order of St John Lateran, 1946 (Vatican)

Keller was posthumously recognized for his wartime activities. He was the first to enter Pisa liberated from the Nazis on 2 September 1944, with the partisan Pierino Fornaciari, liaison officer, with whom he rescued many art works, in particular in the Camposanto Monumentale.

His remains were apportioned and interred in New Britain, Connecticut and the Camposanto Monumentale in Pisa; that site is identified with an engraved marble slab.

== Gallery ==
In addition to his academic career, Keller was a prolific portrait painter. He was known as the "unofficial portraitist of the Yale faculty," completing over 160 portrait commissions for the university, including faculty, corporation board members, and two presidents. With one of his portrait subjects, Thomas G. Bergin, Keller worked in collaboration by illustrating the book On Sepulchers. Portraits for clients outside these Yale commissions included Senator Robert A. Taft, Governor John Davis Lodge, and presidents William Howard Taft and Herbert Hoover.

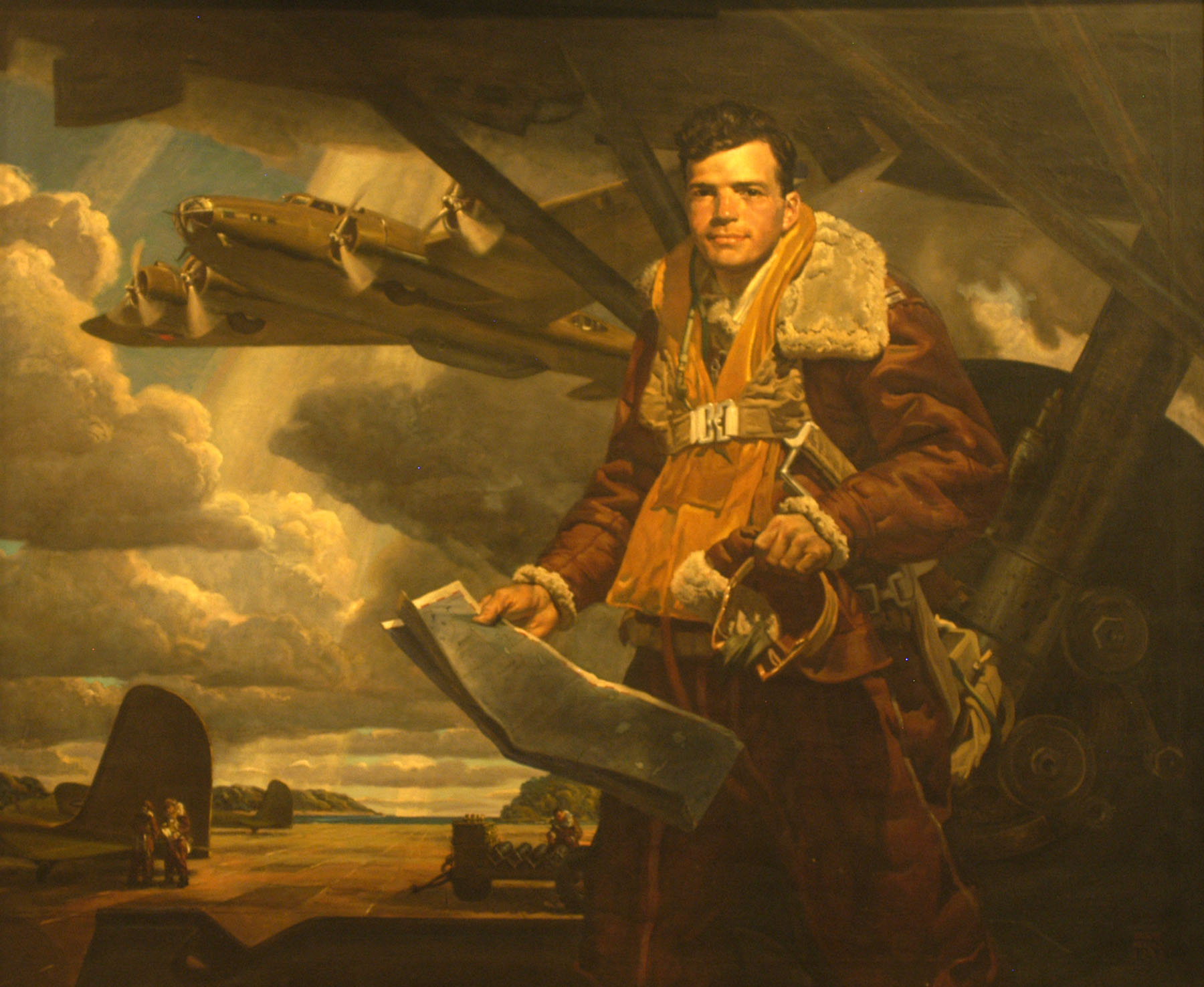
Colin Purdie Kelly, Jr., American aviator, painted by Deane Keller

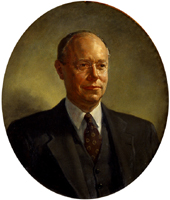
Robert A. Taft, American Senator, painted by Deane Keller

Norman Holmes Pearson, American university professor, painted by Deane Keller

== See also ==
- Roberts Commission
- Rescuing Da Vinci
- The Rape of Europa
- Monuments Men Foundation for the Preservation of Art
