= Deane Keller (draftsman) =

American artist and academic (1940–2005)

Deane G. Keller
- Born: Deane Galloway Keller; August 1, 1940; New Haven, Connecticut, U.S.
- Died: January 4, 2005 (aged 64)
- Resting place: Marlborough, Connecticut, U.S.
- Spouse: Dorothy Bosch Keller (m. 1969)

Deane Galloway Keller (August 1, 1940 – January 4, 2005) was an American artist, academic and author. Keller was a draftsman, painter, sculptor, and teacher who instructed students in the visual arts for forty years, most notably in figure drawing and the artistic application of human anatomy. He is credited with explaining that "drawing offers a unique record of an encounter with a culture, of experience transformed from fleeting moment to lasting resonance."

== Early life ==
He was the son of Deane and Katherine Parkhurst Hall Keller.

He earned a Bachelor of Arts degree in Art History from Yale University, where he studied under his father, and a Master of Arts in Education from St. Joseph College in West Hartford, Connecticut. Additionally, Keller studied in Florence, Italy, with Nera Simi, and anatomy under David Rubins at the Herron School of Art in Indianapolis, Indiana.

== Career ==
For 25 years Keller served as a professor at the Lyme Academy College of Fine Arts. The head of the drawing department, in 2001 he was honored with the endowed Deane G. Keller Chair of Classical Drawing and Figurative Art, a position which he held until his death. Keller was also a member of the faculty of the New York Academy of Art, the Art Students League of New York, the Hartford Art School at the University of Hartford, and the Woodstock School of Art. He lectured on drawing and draftsmanship at the Yale Center for British Art, the Wadsworth Atheneum, and the Graduate School of Design at Harvard University.

A portrait, landscape and still life painter, Keller was in his later years engaged in a series of large charcoal drawings of draped figures inspired by his travels to the Middle East.

== Selected works ==
Keller authored numerous articles, and wrote two books.

- "The Fine Art of Drawing," American Artist. Vol. 64, No. 690 (2000): 20. OCLC 92611357
- Figure Drawing in the Academy Tradition, 1890–1998
- 2002 – Draftsman's Handbook: A Resource and Study Guide for Drawing from Life. Old Lyme, Connecticut: Lyme Academy College of Fine Arts. OCLC 51687128

== Collections ==
Keller's work is in included in a number of public and private collections.

- Wadsworth Atheneum Museum of Art in Hartford, Connecticut
- Brandywine River Museum in Chadds Ford, Pennsylvania
- Slater Museum at the Norwich Free Academy in Norwich, Connecticut
- Woodstock School of Art
- Thomas Merton Center at Bellarmine University, Louisville, Kentucky
- Yale University
- Hospital of St. Raphael (where his statue of Mother Elizabeth Seton graces the entrance hall)
- Asylum Hill Congregational Church in Hartford
- Lyme Academy
- St. John Fisher Roman Catholic Church in Marlborough, CT

== Artists influenced by Keller ==
Keller believed that "for some years the fine art of draftsmanship has suffered some eclipse because learning the craft of figure drawing has been only casually addressed and even discredited by some." His students are evidence to the contrary.

- Eric Mannella
- Allana Benham
- T. Allen Lawson.
