= Edward William Carlson =

American painter

- Born: Edward William Carlson; May 4, 1883; Chicago, Illinois, US
- Died: July 26, 1932 (aged 49); Chikaming, Berrien, Michigan, US
- Resting place: Donaldson, Indiana, US
- Education: School of the Art Institute of Chicago
- Known for: painting, miniature portraits
- Spouse: Eva Randolph Dorchester

Edward William Carlson was an American painter known specifically for his miniature portraits. He exhibited works at the Art Institute of Chicago, Arts Club of Chicago, Royal Academy of Fine Arts (Kungliga Akademien för de fria konsterna) in Stockholm, Sweden, National Academy of Design in New York, Swedish Club of Chicago, and the Cincinnati Museum for Art.

== Childhood ==
Edward William Carlson (May 4, 1883 – July 26, 1932) was an American miniature portraitist. His parents were Swedish immigrants Minnie and John. Carlson spent most of his childhood in Chicago, Illinois, where his parents owned and operated the Englewood Home Laundry.

At four years of age circa 1887 Carlson fell ill with scarlet fever, and as a result, lost both his hearing and eventually his speech.

Carlson was one of eight siblings, though two died young. His remaining brothers and sisters, of whom he was the oldest, were Enoch, Amanda, Esther, Arvid and John.

Around 1900 the Carlson family moved near Grovertown, Indiana where they bought or leased a farm near those of his mother's brothers. At this time Edward Carlson's occupation is a farmhand. He was seventeen years old.

== Adulthood ==
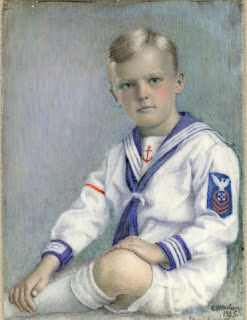
Portrait of Boy in Uniform by Edward William Carlson

As an adolescent Carlson showed an aptitude for painting. Later, after working on the family farm in Indiana, he returned to Chicago and attended the School of the Art Institute of Chicago. (Note: At some point before attending the Art Institute Carlson attended a school for the deaf and mute in Sweden for three years.)

Also attending the Art Institute was Eva Randolph Dorchester (August 28, 1880 – October 14, 1926) of Sherman, Texas who was deaf-mute since birth. Eva had been born in Kentucky. Her father, C. B. Dorchester, was a banker. Before attending the Art Institute Eva had been a student at the Austin Ward 11, Texas School for the Deaf in Travis, Texas, from 1888 to 1900. Carlson and Eva met at the Art Institute and their relationship grew.

Between 1907 and 1910 Carlson boarded at various residences in Chicago, probably while attending the School of the Art Institute of Chicago. By 1910 he was living with his uncle August Holmquist, his aunt Hanna, and his young cousins Alma, Ebba, Alice and Violet at their home on 2700, West 23rd Street, Chicago.

Eva graduated from the School of the Art Institute of Chicago on June 23, 1911, having taken the three-year course in drawing, painting and sculpture. That same year, after visiting Edward's family in Indiana, Edward and Eva were married on Wednesday, October 4, 1911, in Hopkins, Texas. Afterward they returned to Chicago.

The following year in 1912 Edward won the prize for miniature painting in an exhibit at the Swedish Club of Chicago .

On December 3, 1913, Eva gave birth to their daughter, Marjorie Nellie.

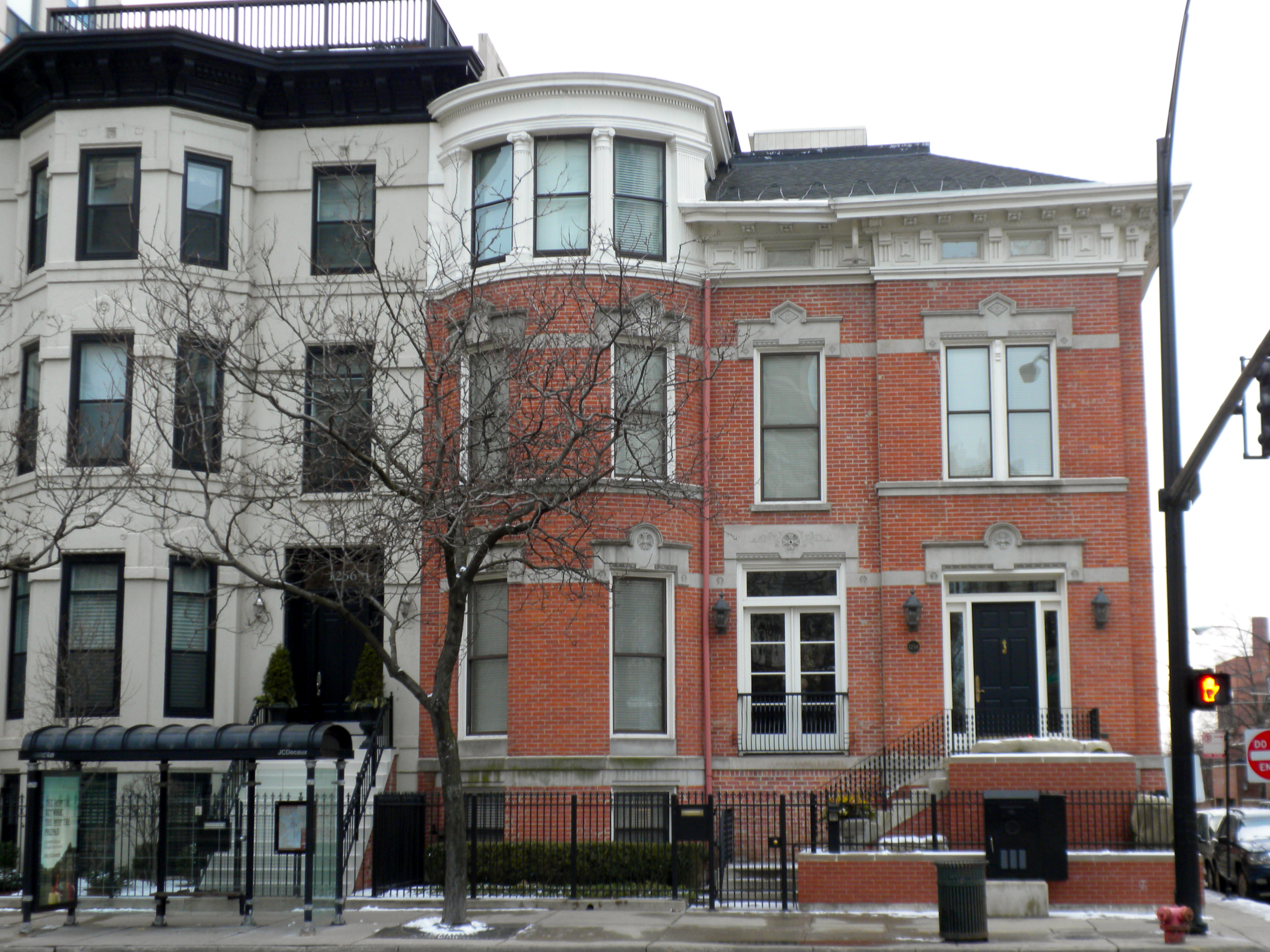
Swedish Club of Chicago

In 1915 Carlson again exhibited some of his portraits at the Swedish Club of Chicago. "Among the miniature portraits there are six by Edward Carlson of Chicago, which are the pride of the exhibit."

An accomplished miniature portraitist, Carlson's work appeared often at the Art Institute of Chicago, and in other venues. In 1920 a number of his portraits were included in an exhibition of one hundred pieces by forty artists, which traveled first to New York and then to the cities of Stockholm, Gothenburg, and Malmö, Sweden. Art critic Elisabeth Luther Cary, the first full-time art critic for The New York Times, wrote, "The small group of miniatures by Ed. W. Carlson sets a neat period [to the end] of the exhibition. They are careful and expert in execution and show unremitting interest in essential character [of his subjects] which is the best gift Sweden has sent to the art of America."

On October 14, 1926, at 46 years of age, Eva died of stomach cancer in her mother's home in Texas. Marjorie was twelve years old.

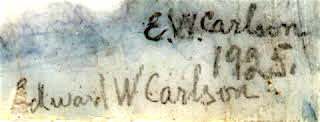
Signature of Edward William Carlson

In July of the following year, Edward and Marjorie took the train to the National Fraternal Society for the Deaf (NFSD) convention, attended by about 800 people, in Denver, Colorado. After the convention Edward and Marjorie headed west. "Ed. W. Carlson and 13-year-old daughter, Majorie, left Denver for Spokane, Portland, California and Texas points a two months' trip. It was very touching to see the tender care with which Carlson consoled his little girl [whose] mother died in Texas...."

In 1929 Carlson was awarded first prize in the miniature category from the Swedish Club of Chicago.

By 1930 Edward and Marjorie were boarders with the Hooper family, who were originally from Texas, at 7143 Evans Avenue, Chicago.

Edward died five years after the death of Eva, on Tuesday, July 26, 1932, after a long struggle with asthma, at his sister's home in Chikaming, Berrien, Michigan, USA. He was forty-nine years of age. Marjorie was eighteen years old at the time.

== Memberships ==
Carlson was a founding member of the Chicago Society of Miniature Painters, a member of the Society of Western Artists, and the Chicago Society of Artists. (Note: Other founding members of the Chicago Society of Miniature Painters were Anna Lynch, Eda Nemoede Casterton, Carolyn D. Tyler, Marian Dunlap Harper, Magda Heuermann, Katherine Wolcott, Mabel Packard, Kate Bacon Bond, Frances M. Beem, Eva L. Carman, Helen B. Slutz, Evelyn Purdie, Edna Amelia Robeson, and Alden F. Brooks.)

== Paintings ==
Paintings by Edward William Carlson include:

- A Man
- A Priest
- A Study of Profile
- Baby
- Beatrice
- Edward Hines, Jr.
- Grace
- Lady in Green
- Lieutenant Barsanti
- Little Nellie
- Margaret
- Miss Annie Page
- Miss Ruth Larson
- Miss S.
- Mother
- Mr. John Olson
- Mr. William S. Taylor
- Mrs. A. W. Loeb
- Mrs. A. X. Schmitt
- Mrs. Emil Wetten
- Mrs. H.
- Mrs. Mabel Sykes
- Mrs. Manff and Two Children
- My Daughter Marjorie (Note: Marjorie Nellie (Carlson) Semmes (December 3, 1913 – May 11, 2006))
- Portrait of a Boy in Uniform
- Portrait of an Artist
- Portrait of Arthur
- Portrait of Elsie
- Portrait of Esther
- Portrait of Katherine Wilson
- Portrait of Kathryn S.
- Portrait of Mabel Sykes
- Portrait of Miss E. H.
- Portrait of Miss M.
- Portrait of Miss R.
- Portrait of Miss S.
- Portrait of Mother
- Portrait of Mr. C. S. Peterson
- Portrait of Mr. J. F. B.
- Portrait of Mrs. C. B. Dorchester (Note: Artist's mother-in-law)
- Portrait of Mrs. C. S. Terry
- Portrait of Mrs. F. C. Dillard
- Portrait of Mrs. S.
- Portrait of Mrs. W.
- Portrait of My Baby (Note: Probably Marjorie Nellie (Carlson) Semmes (December 3, 1913 – May 11, 2006))
- Portrait of My Sister
- Portrait of Reverend H. (Note: Probably P. J. Hasenstab)
- Portrait of the Late Mr. L. T. W.
- Rev. P. J. Hasenstat
- Robert Winslow Winchell
- Teddy Lindstrom
- The Late Mr. Frederick Waskow
- The Late Mr. Lindsay F. Woodcock
- The Late Mr. Tom Randolph (Note: Exhibited in 1922 at the Swedish Club of Chicago. See "Art", Svenska Tribunen-Nyheter, February 1, 1922. [Translated from the Swedish and made available through the Foreign Language Press Survey])
- Virginia
