= Chicago Society of Miniature Painters =

American art society

Chicago Society of Miniature Painters was founded to promote the work of miniature portrait painters of Chicago. The society held annual exhibits starting in 1912 and continued to at least 1944.

Though a society of Chicago miniature portrait painters, miniature portrait painters from other American cities were later invited to exhibit their work at the annual exhibits.

== Founding members ==
Founding members included Anna Lynch, Eda Nemoede Casterton, Carolyn D. Tyler, Marian Dunlap Harper, Magda Heuermann, Katherine Wolcott, Mabel Packard, Kate Bacon Bond, Edward William Carlson, Frances M. Beem, Eva L. Carman, Helen B. Slutz, Evelyn Purdie, Edna Amelia Robeson and Alden F. Brooks.

== Exhibitions ==
=== Sixth Annual Exhibition (1918) ===
In 1918 the Chicago Tribune wrote that the Society's Sixth Annual Exhibition was "decidedly reserved" adding that "Delicate handling is evident throughout and no desire has been shown by any of the artists to indulge in experiments".

Throughout the years American artists from various parts of the country had been featured in the exhibitions including Edna Robeson's ivory medallion, called "My Sister"; Theodora Larsh, a miniature painter from Indiana; and a painting called "The Girl With Red Hair" by New York artist William J. Whittemore.

=== Eighth Annual Exhibition (1920) ===
The Eighth Annual Exhibition by the Chicago Society of Miniature Painters in 1920 was held at The Art Institute Exhibition at the Art Institute of Chicago. The annual Chicago exhibit had grown to included works by miniature painters, all women, from Philadelphia, New York, Boston, Newark, N. J., Pasadena, California, Davenport, Iowa and other smaller cities in the eastern USA. These artists were Anna Lynch, Magda Heuermann, Carolyn Tyler, Marian Dunlap Harper, Eda Nemoede Casterton, Anna Margaretta Archambault, Rosina Cox Boardman, Marie-Marguerite Frechette, Laura Coombs Hills, Nancy B. Robinson and Caroline King Phillip.

=== National Miniature Exhibit (1933) ===
Artists representing the Chicago Society of Miniature Painters exhibited their work at the A Century of Progress International Exposition, also known as the Chicago World's Fair held from 1933 to 1934. Along with the Chicago Society were artists representing the American Society of Miniature Painters, the Brooklyn Society of Miniature Painters, the California Society of Miniature Painters and the Pennsylvania Society of Miniature Painters.

The twenty-four artists representing the Chicago Society of Miniature Painters were mostly, or perhaps all, women.
