= Longacre =

Longacre, long acre or longacres may refer to:

== General ==
- Drovers' road#Long acre, wide grassy road verges

== Places ==
- Long Acre, a street in London, England
- Longacre Square, former name for Times Square and Duffy Square in Manhattan, New York, United States
- Longacres, Olinda, a heritage-listed house in the Yarra Ranges, Victoria, Australia
- Longacres, St Albans, England (site of Marconi Instruments)

== People with the surname ==
- Amanda Longacre (born 1989), American beauty pageant winner
- Breta Longacre (1887–1923), American painter
- Edward Longacre (born 1946), American author
- James B. Longacre (1794–1869), American engraver
- Jacqulyn Longacre (1932–2018), American birth control activist
- Lydia Longacre (1870–1951), American painter
- Matt Longacre (born 1991), American football player
- Robert E. Longacre (1922–2014), American linguist
- William A. Longacre (1937–2015), American archaeologist

== Theatres ==
- Longacre Theatre, a Broadway theatre, New York, USA
- Queen's Theatre, Long Acre, a former London theatre, England

== Horse racing ==
- Longacres, a former horse-racing track in Washington, USA
- Longacres Mile Handicap, a horse race held now annually at Emerald Downs racetrack in Auburn, Washington, USA

== Companies ==
- Longacre Press, a New Zealand publisher

== See also ==
- Acre (disambiguation)
