= Gustavus Hamilton (painter) =

Irish painter

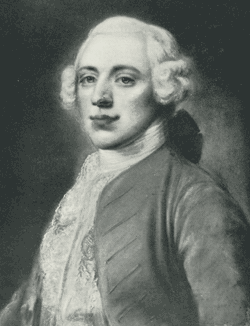
- Born: circa 1739; Ireland
- Died: 16 December 1775 (aged 35–36); Dublin

Gustavus Hamilton (c. 1739–16 December 1775) was an Irish miniature painter.

== Life and family ==
Gustavus Hamilton was born circa 1739. He was the son of Rev. Gustavus Hamilton, vicar of Errigal and rector of Gallon, County Meath and his wife Jane (née Cathcart). Hamilton was one of the couple's younger children. The Hamiltons claimed descent from the Hamiltons of Priestfield, Midlothian, Scotland.

Hamilton lived in Dublin at Parliament Street from 1765 to 1768, 1 Dame Street, College Green, and Cork Hill. He died at his home on Cork Hill on 16 December 1775 age 36, and is buried at St Werburgh's, Dublin on 18 December. A plaque was later erected in his memory there.

== Career ==
One of Hamilton's teachers was Irish painter Robert West at his school on George's Lane, Dublin. Hamilton received awards for drawing in 1755 and 1756. He was also an apprentice or pupil of Samuel Dixon of Capel Street, Dublin, where he was employed in colouring the basso-relievo prints of birds and flowers produced by Dixon alongside miniaturists James Reily and Daniel O'Keefe. Reily and Hamilton painted miniatures in the 1750s and 1760s, working in watercolour on ivory in the "modest" manner of Nathaniel Hone. Along with other artists like Thomas Boulger (fl. 1761–88) and Luke Sullivan, Hamilton was a link between the earlier miniaturists in style and technical skill and those from the later 18th century. This period and group are seen as formative in the development of ivory and watercolour miniature painting.

His paintings are typically signed with his initials, with "ham." coupled with date, or as "Gus. Hamilton, sometimes with and sometimes without a date. His draftsmanship has been criticised as sometimes poor. He is known for his portrait's faces sometimes having a bluish cast. His miniatures are small, with the intention of being worn as jewellery. An exemplar of Hamilton's work is his portrait of Rev. Joshua Nunn held in the National Gallery of Ireland. The portrait bears stylistic similarities with the work of English miniaturist, Samuel Collins, who lived in Dublin from 1762 to 1768. Hamilton continued to refine his technique, with Portrait of an unknown gentleman showing this development. Hamilton exhibited his miniatures between 1765 and 1773 at the Society of Artists in Ireland in Dublin.
