= Alexandrina Robertson Harris =

American painter (1886–1978)

Alexandrina Robertson Harris (1886 – 1978) was an American painter of portrait miniatures.

Harris was born in Aberdeen but later emigrated to the United States. She studied at Adelphi College, receiving while there a number of prizes for her work. From 1933 until 1935, she was president of the National Association of Women Artists, in which role she advocated for the position of the arts in American life. She was serving as president of the American Society of Miniature Painters at its disbandment in 1965, and in conjunction with Rosina Cox Boardman arranged the presentation of twenty-two works by its members to the Smithsonian Institution. Harris was serving as a vice-president of the Brooklyn Society of Artists in 1919; three years later she received the Charlotte Richie Smith Memorial Prize for a portrait miniature from the Baltimore Water Color Club.

Harris is represented in the collections of the Smithsonian American Art Museum by three miniature portraits, all in watercolor on ivory. One, from about 1920, depicts Professor J.B. Whittaker, under whom she had studied at Adelphi College; the other two depict Amelia Earhart (c. 1935) and Jacqueline Cochran (c. 1950) A 1937 work in the same medium, Portrait of Mrs. Amorette Frazer, is held by the Brooklyn Museum.
