= Anna Lynch (painter) =

American painter

- Born: April 22, 1865; Elgin, Illinois, U.S.
- Died: January 8, 1946 (aged 80); Elgin, Illinois, U.S.
- Education: School of the Art Institute of Chicago; Académie Julian
- Known for: Portrait miniatures, portraits, still life, landscapes, marine paintings
- Movement: Conservative, traditional
- Awards: Bronze medal, Panama Pacific International Exposition (1915)

Anna Lynch (April 22, 1865 – January 8, 1946) was an American painter.

Lynch, whose birthdate is sometimes given as 1868, was born in Elgin, Illinois. A student of John Vanderpoel at the School of the Art Institute of Chicago, she first exhibited portrait miniatures at the institution's annual exhibition in 1897. She would go on to show work in the school's annual shows for local artists for over thirty years.

In 1902 Lynch traveled to Paris, where her instructors at the Académie Julian included William-Adolphe Bouguereau and Gabrielle Debillemont-Chardon. She showed work in the Paris Salons of 1903 and 1904 before returning to Chicago in 1905, a year before her miniatures were the subject of a solo exhibition at the Art Institute. She began exhibiting widely elsewhere, receiving a bronze medal at the Panama Pacific International Exposition in 1915. In 1921 she was among the founding members of the Chicago Society of Miniature Painters, whose first president she became. Lynch took studio space in the Tree Building in 1908.

She was especially noted for miniatures of children, but as the medium lost popularity she began to create more full-sized portraits and still-life images. Later in her career, she produced landscapes and marine paintings, many based on trips she had taken abroad to France and Spain. She was conservative in style, showing with the Chicago Society of Painters and Sculptors and the Society for Sanity in Art as well as the Chicago Galleries Association; but at the same time she also belonged to the Arts Club of Chicago, which was more modern in outlook. Lynch died in her hometown of Elgin.
