= Samuel Collins (artist) =

English painter

Samuel Collins (1735–1768) was an English miniature painter at Bath.

== Life ==
He was the son of a clergyman at Bristol. He was originally educated as an attorney, but quit this profession and became a miniature-painter. He settled at Bath, where he soon obtained a very large practice, and gained the reputation of one of the most perfect miniature-painters in this country. He had numerous pupils, among whom was Ozias Humphry, to whom he eventually relinquished his practice at Bath. He then removed to Dublin and enjoyed a high reputation there. He painted both on enamel and on ivory.
