= John Dixon (engraver) =

John Dixon (1740?–1811) was an Irish mezzotint engraver.

== Life ==
He was born in Dublin about 1740. His father was Thomas Dixon, a hosier, of Cork Hill. His brother Samuel Dixon, was a watercolourist and printmaker. John Dixon received his art training in the Dublin Society's schools, of which Robert West was then master, and began life as an engraver of silver plate. In 1760 Dixon engraved a map of County Dublin produced by the British surveyor and cartographer John Rocque. He moved to London about 1765, and in the following year became a member of the Incorporated Society of Artists, with whom he exhibited until 1775.

Dixon was, in politics, a follower of John Wilkes, and some of his portraits are of other Wilkites. His early publisher was William Wynne Ryland. A handsome man, he married in 1775 Ann, the widow of Nicholas Kempe, one of the owners of Ranelagh Gardens. After that he engraved only as recreation. He later moved to Kensington.

== Works ==
Dixon's portraits of William Carmichael after Ennis, and of Nicholas Taaffe, 6th Viscount Taaffe, after Robert Hunter, are thought to have been engraved before he left Ireland. Soon after his arrival in London he became known for his full-length portrait of David Garrick in the character of "Richard III" in the Shakespeare play, after Nathaniel Dance-Holland.

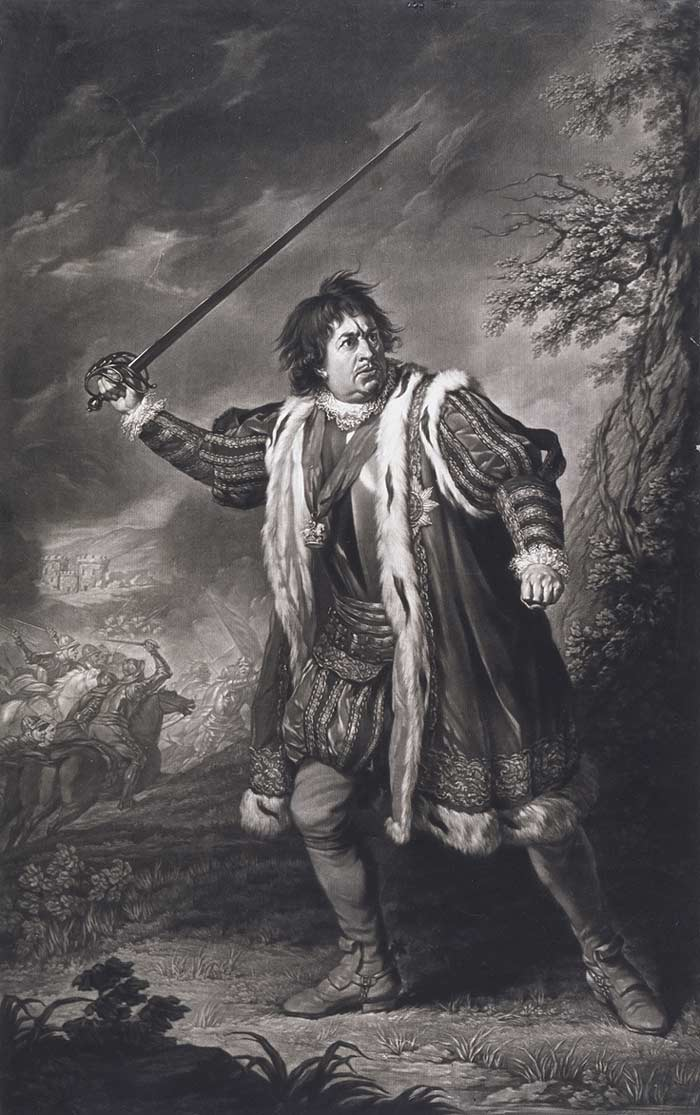
David Garrick as Richard III, 1772 engraving by John Dixon

Forty plates by Dixon were described by John Chaloner Smith in British Mezzotinto Portraits. The major engravings are after the works of Sir Joshua Reynolds, and include:

- Full-length portraits of Mary, duchess of Ancaster, and Mrs. Blake as "Juno";
- William, duke of Leinster;
- Henry, tenth earl of Pembroke,
- Elizabeth, countess of Pembroke, and her son;
- The Misses Crewe,
- Charles Townshend, chancellor of the exchequer;
- William Robertson, D.D.;
- Nelly O'Brien; and
- Miss Davidson.

Besides these portraits, Dixon engraved:

- A group of David Garrick as "Abel Drugger" in The Alchemist, with William Burton and John Palmer as "Subtle" and "Face", after Zoffany;
- A full-length of Garrick alone, from the same picture;
- A half-length of Garrick, after Thomas Hudson;
- William, Earl of Ancrum, full-length, after Gilpin and Cosway;
- Henry Scott, 3rd Duke of Buccleuch, and Joshua Kirby, after Thomas Gainsborough;
- Rev. James Hervey, after J. Williams;
- Sir William Browne, M.D., after Hudson;
- "Betty", who sold fruit near the Royal Exchange, after Peter Falconet; and
- William Beckford, both full-length and three-quarter reversed, after a drawing by himself.

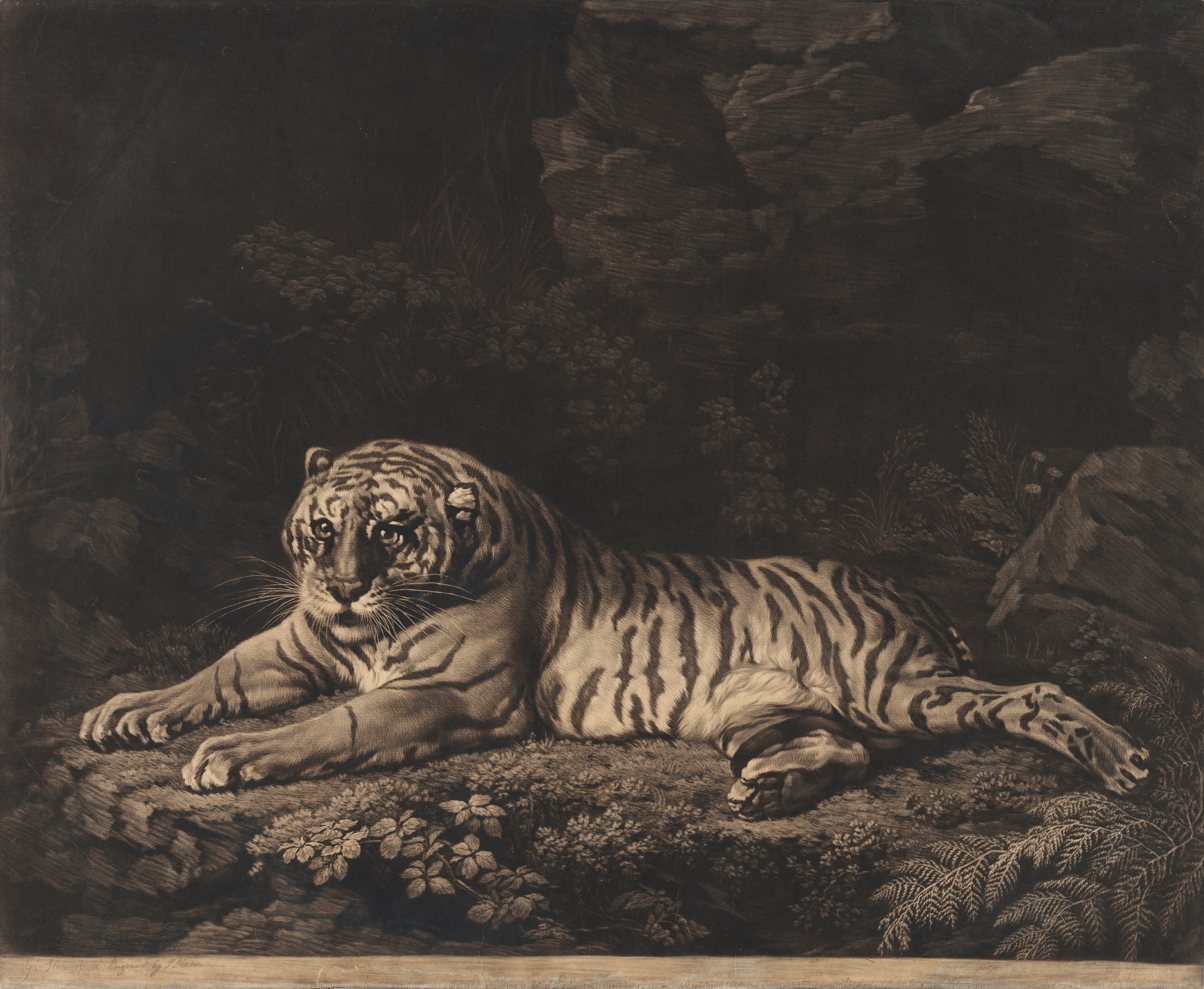
Tigress (1773). Chester Beatty Library

Others works were:

- "The Frame Maker", after Rembrandt;
- "The Flute Player", after Frans Hals; and
- "The Arrest" and "The Oracle", after his own designs.

== Notes ==
Attribution

This article incorporates text from a publication now in the public domain: Stephen, Leslie, ed. (1888). "Dixon, John (1740?-1780?)". Dictionary of National Biography. Vol. 15. London: Smith, Elder & Co.
