= Lydia Longacre =

American painter (1870–1951)

Lydia Eastwick Longacre (September 1, 1870 – June 19, 1951) was an American painter known especially for her portrait miniatures.

Born in New York City, Longacre was the granddaughter of James Barton Longacre and the daughter of Reverend Andrew Longacre, both of whom had successfully pursued careers as miniature painters. She took lessons at the Art Students League of New York. Among her instructors was William Merritt Chase and Harry Siddons Mowbray; she also traveled to Paris, where she studied with James Abbott McNeill Whistler at the Académie Carmen. Her sister Breta also became a painter. She exhibited with the American Society of Miniature Painters, whose Levantia White Boardman Award for best miniature she received in 1949, and with the Old Lyme Art Association in Connecticut. She died in Old Lyme, and is buried in the family plot at Philadelphia's Woodlands Cemetery. Longacre is represented in the collection of the Smithsonian American Art Museum by a miniature portrait of Rosina Cox Boardman, a watercolor on ivory dating to 1937; a miniature portrait in the same medium of Bruce Crane, painted in 1931, is owned by the Metropolitan Museum of Art. Four of her paintings are currently among the holdings of Old Lyme's Florence Griswold Museum.
