= The Rice portrait =

Purported portrait of Jane Austen

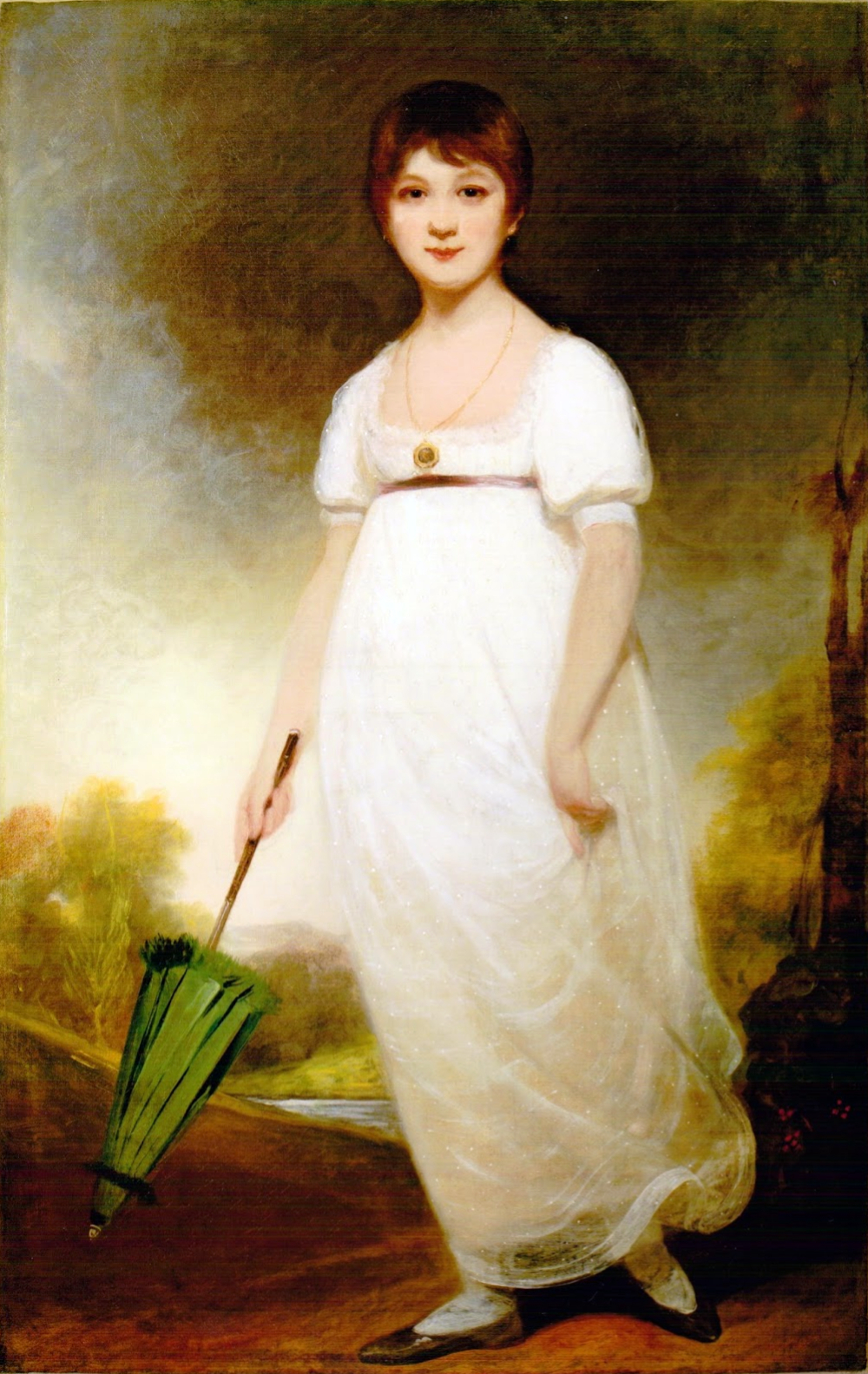
The "Rice Portrait" by Humphry, claimed to be Jane Austen ca. 1790-1810

The Rice portrait is believed by the owners and others to be of Jane Austen and painted by Ozias Humphry in 1788 or 1789 when Austen was 13. Experts at the National Portrait Gallery (and elsewhere) have disputed this, suggesting that the painting dates to the early 19th century and thus cannot be of Austen, or painted by Humphry.

== History ==
The Rice portrait is believed by some to have been painted by Ozias Humphry in 1788/89 when Austen was 13. The owners contend that it was commissioned by Austen's great-uncle, Francis Austen, during a visit. The portrait was originally mistakenly attributed to Johann Zoffany but is now believed by its supporters to have been painted by Ozias Humphry. It is now known that Francis Austen knew Humphry and the artist had painted a portrait of Francis Austen in 1780 which is now in the Graves Gallery, Sheffield.

In 1884 the portrait was used as an illustration in a collected edition of her letters published by Lord Brabourne, a relative of Jane Austen. It was used again by another relative, Mary Augusta Austen-Leigh, in her book about Austen published in 1920. It was photographed by Emery Walker in about 1910. The National Portrait Gallery, London attempted to purchase the work in the 1930s but were unable to buy it. In 1948, the Austen scholar, R. W. Chapman, rejected the identity of the sitter based on costume evidence.

This was at around the same time the National Portrait Gallery purchased the small sketch of Jane Austen which they claim was painted by Austen's sister Cassandra.

In 1994, the portrait was exhibited at Olympia. Henry Rice, the then owner, offered it to the National Portrait Gallery, but they were unwilling to buy it. The portrait was given an export licence on the advice of the National Portrait Gallery on the basis that it was not of Austen. It was put up for auction at Christie's in New York in 2007, but failed to sell.

In 2019 the owners revealed a letter allegedly written by Jane Austen's great-niece Fanny Caroline Lefroy describing the history of the portrait.

== Provenance ==
The most significant evidence for the authenticity of the portrait is its provenance. It is known to have passed from Thomas Austen (grandson of Francis Austen) to a friend, Elizabeth Harding-Newman, in 1818, the year after Austen died. She may have met Jane Austen as her aunt was married to a friend of the novelist. It was described as "the novelist, Jane".

== Inscriptions ==
In 2012, research and forensic work was undertaken using digital analysis of photograph negatives from 1910 held in the Heinz Archive & Library taken prior to a later poor cleaning and over-painting of the portrait. This digital enhancement is said to show that the signature of Ozias Humphry, and the name Jane Austen is visible on the photograph. These inscriptions were apparently lost after successive restorations.
