= Ozias Humphry =

English painter (1742–1810)

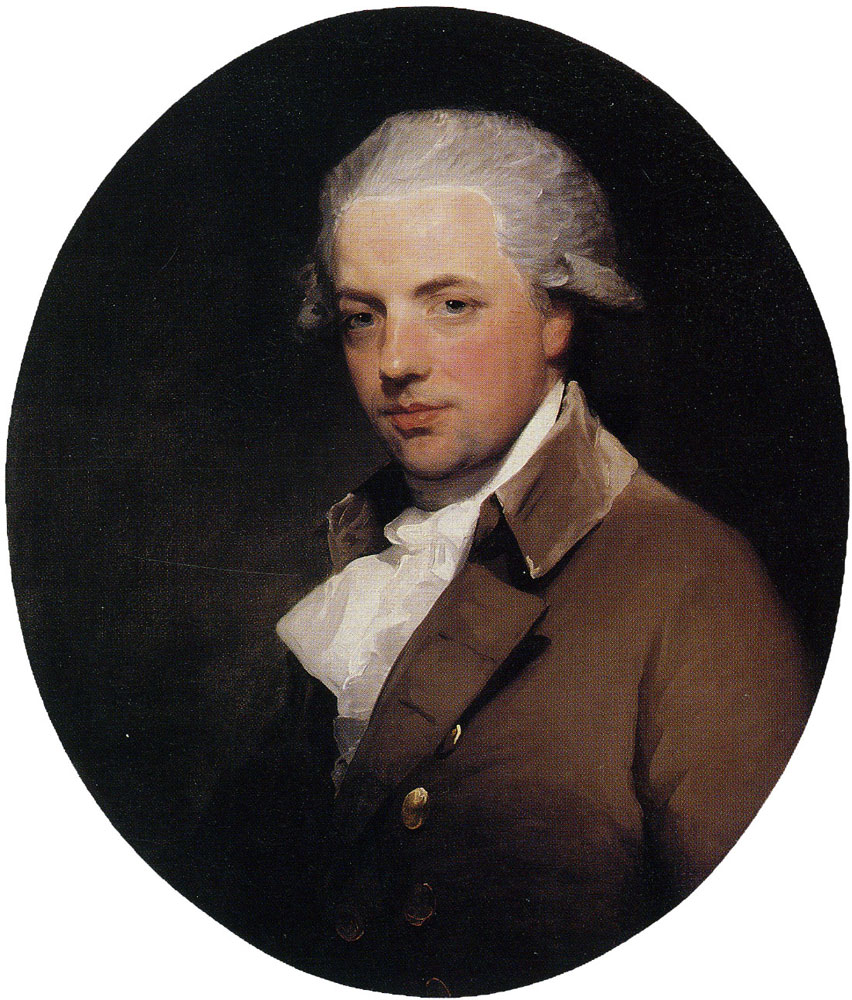
- portrait by Gilbert Stuart
- Born: 8 September 1742; Honiton
- Died: 9 March 1810; London
- Occupation: Painter

Ozias Humphry RA (8 September 1742 – 9 March 1810) was an English painter who specialised in portrait painting, including portrait miniatures. Humphry was elected to the Royal Academy in 1791, and in 1792 he was appointed Portrait Painter in Crayons to the King (i.e. pastels).

== Name ==
Humphry is the spelling Ozias himself used in his signature on the backing card of his miniature of Charlotte, Princess Royal (1769; Windsor Castle). This is also the spelling given in the catalogues of the annual exhibitions of the Royal Academy from 1779 to 1795. The different spelling in the far more common form of Humphrey may originally well be due to a mistake but was already in use during his own lifetime. It appears thus in the Royal Academy catalogues for the years 1796 and 1797 as well as in the writings of Horace Walpole and John Thomas Smith. Humphry is the generally used spelling today.

== Early life ==
Born and schooled in Honiton, Devon, Humphry was attracted by the gallery of casts opened by the Duke of Richmond and came to London to study art at Shipley's school. He also studied art in Bath (under Samuel Collins, taking over his practice in 1762); in Bath, he lodged with Thomas Linley. As a young artist, he found his talent encouraged by Thomas Gainsborough and Sir Joshua Reynolds, among others. His problems with his sight, which ultimately led to blindness, began in the early 1770s and forced him to paint larger works in oils and pastel.

== Visit to Italy ==
He traveled to Italy in 1773 with his great friend George Romney, stopping en route at Knole, near Sevenoaks in Kent, where the Duke of Dorset commissioned several works from him. His stay in Italy lasted until 1777.

On his return, his numerous subjects included George Stubbs (1777), fellow academician Dominic Serres, the chemist Joseph Priestley, and allegedly a portrait claimed to be of the teenage Jane Austen, from perhaps as early as 1790 (clothing styles suggest a later date), known as the "Rice" portrait after a later owner, though this has always been a controversial attribution of the sitter. This failed to reach its minimum estimate in a Christie's auction in April 2007, and was withdrawn from sale. His pupils included John Opie. He compiled a fifty-page manuscript A Memoir of George Stubbs, based on what Stubbs had related to him; it is the only contemporary biography. This was edited and privately published in the 1870s and republished in 2005. He also knew William Blake and commissioned copies of some of his illustrated books. At least one of Blake's letters to him is a significant document for Blake's biographers.

== Career in India and death ==
From 1785 to 1787, he painted in India, producing many miniatures and sketches first at Bombay and later at Delhi, and Agra. Humphry was one of very few English artists in India at the time and his miniature production was at first very lucrative. But word of his success reached England, which induced three other miniature painters to travel to India, including the renowned John Smart. Fear of this competition first led Humprey to move inland, and later to return to England.

Humphry was elected a member of the Royal Academy in 1791. In 1792 he was appointed Portrait Painter in Crayons to the King. Most of his many portraits of the Royal Family are still in the Royal Collection.

His sight finally failed in 1797, and he died in 1810 in Hampstead, north London.

The bulk of his possessions came into the hands of his natural son, William Upcott, the book collector. From him the British Museum acquired a large number of papers relating to Humphry. He is alluded to in some lines by Hayley.

== Gallery ==
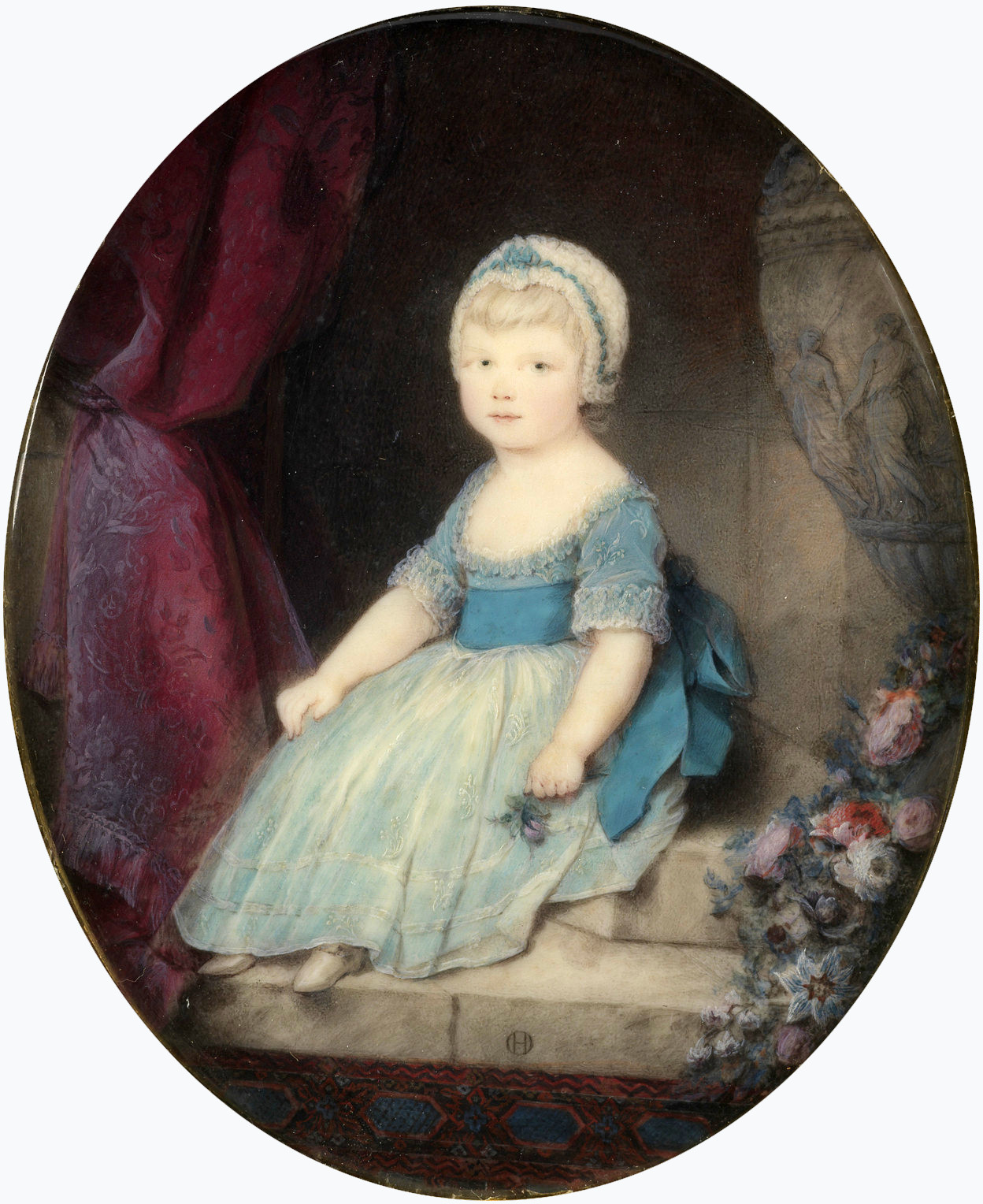
Charlotte, Princess Royal (1769)

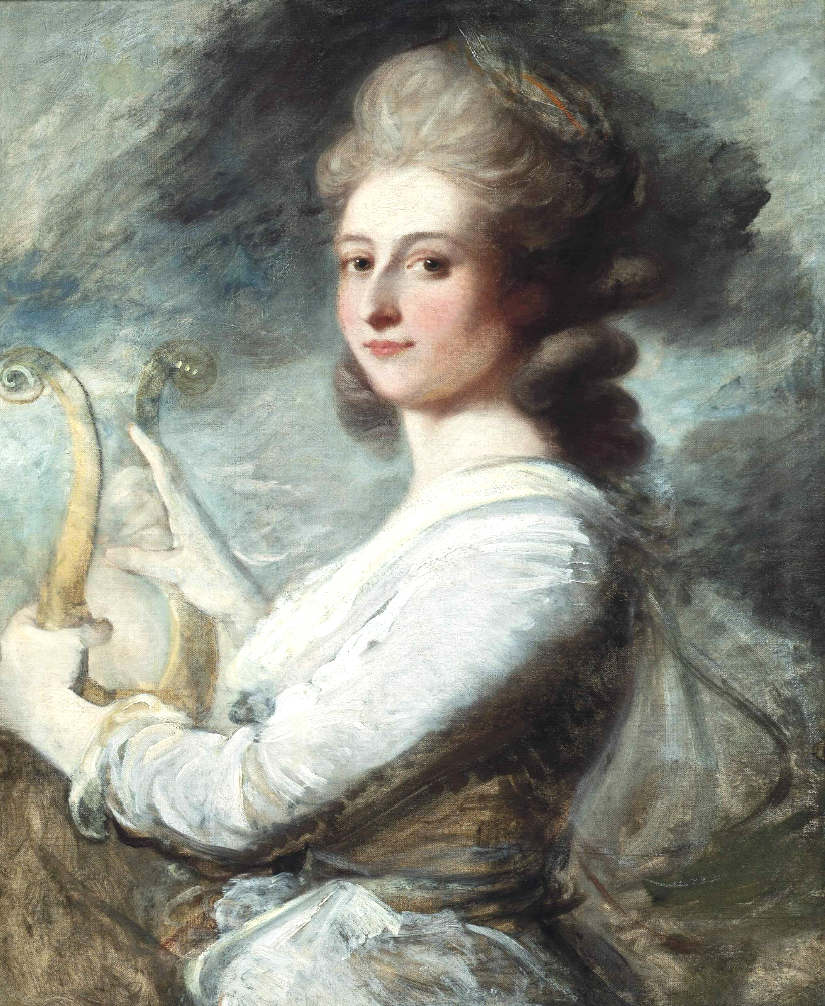
Portrait of Signora Sestini

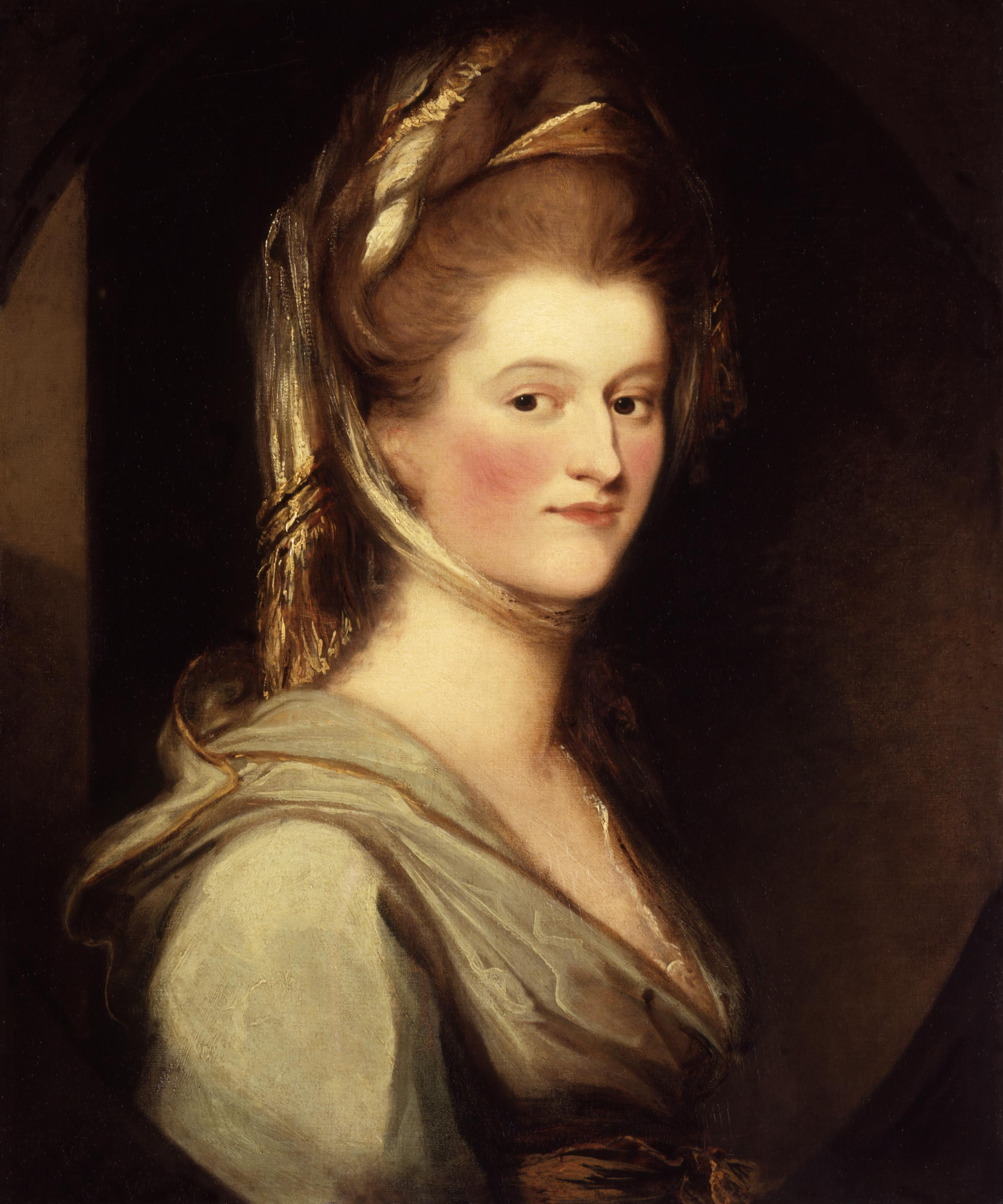
Elizabeth (Berkeley), Margravine of Anspach (1780)

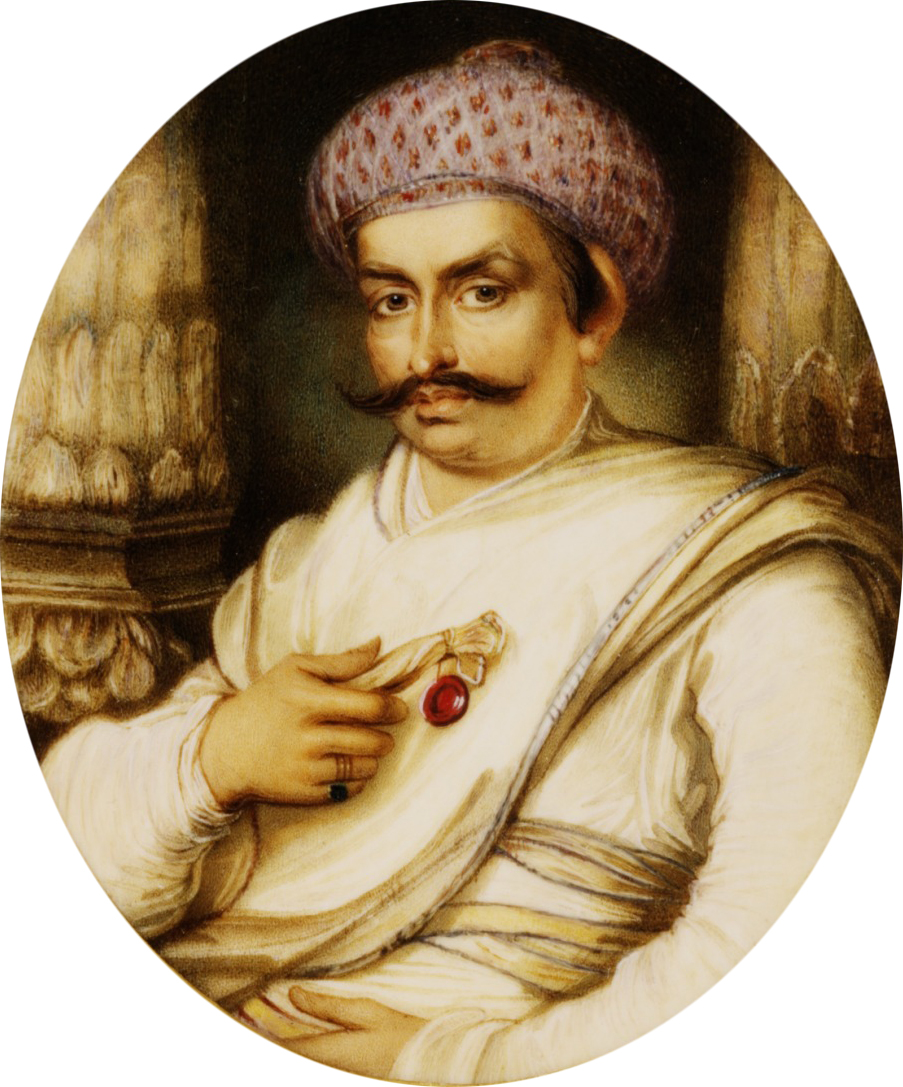
Portrait of Hyder Beg Khan (1786)
