= Cornelia Ellis Hildebrandt =

American painter (1876–1962)

- Born: September 7, 1876; Eau Claire, Wisconsin
- Died: March 18, 1962 (aged 85); New Canaan, Connecticut
- Known for: portrait miniatures
- Spouse: Howard Logan Hildebrandt

Cornelia Ellis Hildebrandt (September 7, 1876 – March 18, 1962) was an American artist particularly known for her portrait miniatures. One of the last surviving figures from the revival of miniature painting in America at the turn of the 20th century, she lectured extensively on the genre in her later years.

== Life ==
Hildebrandt was born Cornelia Trumbull Ellis in Eau Claire, Wisconsin, the daughter of Arthur Cadwalader and Eliza (Potter) Ellis. She studied at the Art Institute of Chicago and then spent two years in Paris (1897–1898), where she studied at the Académie Colarossi and with Augustus Koopman and Virginia Richmond Reynolds. During her time there she met the American portrait artist Howard Logan Hildebrandt, who would later become her husband. His painting Miss C is thought to be portrait of her.

On her return from Paris she had a studio in Chicago for a while, but after her marriage to Howard Hildebrandt on September 3, 1902, the couple settled in New York City. By 1912 she had established her career as a miniaturist with a solo exhibition of 15 of her paintings at the Worcester Art Museum. She was a member of the American Society of Miniature Painters and the National Association of Women Painters and Sculptors at whose exhibitions she was awarded numerous medals. During the 1930s she was also a member of the Works Progress Administration. Cornelia and Howard Hildebrandt spent much of their later years at their summer home in New Canaan, Connecticut. Howard Hildebrandt died in 1958. Cornelia died in New Canaan four years later at the age of 85.
