= National Fraternal Society for the Deaf =

National Fraternal Society of the Deaf
- Abbreviation: NFSD
- Formation: June 14, 1901
- Purpose: Providing burial benefits and insurance to the deaf.

The National Fraternal Society of the Deaf was an organization of deaf people in the United States and Canada modeled on ethnic fraternal orders that were popular at the beginning of the twentieth century.

== History ==
The origins of the Society go back to a Masonic youth organization called the Coming Men of America that was active in the 1890s and 1900s. At one point a chapter of the C. M. A. was founded at the Michigan School for the Deaf in Flint, Michigan. After graduation many of the alumni of this school migrated to Chicago. In the summer of 1901 they met to discuss the lack of opportunities for deaf people to obtain insurance. At a reunion of the Flint School graduates on June 14, 1901, they decided to form the Fraternal Society of the Deaf, which was incorporated that August.

The organization began to founder as early as the 1980s when insurance companies began to issue policies to deaf people. As the number of policies turned in by voluntary surrender or redemption upon the members' passing began to outpace new members joining the Frat (as it was informally known among the deaf), the Illinois Department of Insurance gave the NFSD three options - increase membership, transfer the insurance policies to another organization and become a social organization, or disband. An effort was made to recruit new members but, in the end, the NFSD wound up getting out of the insurance business, with the Canadian members' policies being transferred to the Croatian Fraternal Union in 1994, and the US members' policies to the Catholic Order of Foresters in 2000. The NFSD tried to continue as a fraternal society, but with the main reason for its existence gone, and the advancing age of many of its remaining members, the various local divisions began disbanding, and the NFSD ceased operations on March 6, 2010.

One of the key people in the Frat's earlier years was Peters N. Heller Jr. A few other key individuals in the Frat's history included Francis 'Gib' Gibson, Frank B. Sullivan, Lenny Warshawsky, Robert Anderson, Wayne Shook, and the last Grand President, Albert Van Nevel Jr.

== Purpose ==
When the Frat was established, other insurance companies saw the deaf as an uninsurable risk, so the Frat offered burial benefits, life insurance, and sickness / accident coverage. Initially, membership was restricted to deaf men. Auxiliary divisions were established for the women and children, but they were eventually welcomed as full members of the Society.

== Membership and organization ==
The NFSD moved into its first permanent office in Oak Park, Illinois, in 1936 and to an 'ultramodern' office in Mount Prospect, Illinois, in 1975. The NFSD moved its home office one more time in the early 2000s, to Springfield, Illinois, but sold the office in 2009 while preparing to relocate its operations to the Deaf Cultural Center in Olathe, Kansas. A ladies' auxiliary was created in 1953, but in 1979, the members of the auxiliary became full members of NFSD. Those who were not deaf or were not healthy enough to become insured members could become social members. By the mid-1990s people who are not deaf, but who worked in the field of deafness were also invited to join. As of the late 1960s, the NFSD had just over 10,000 members, and peaked at around 13,000 members in 1979, a number it maintained through the 1980s. In 1994 the NFSD had 11,000 members.

The local lodges of the NFSD were known as (subordinate) divisions, of which there were 126 in the US and Canada as of 1979, increasing to 167 in the 1980s. Every four years, the 'Grand Division' was convened, its members composed of the Board and delegates from each subordinate division, and its location was chosen from a state that had at least two divisions. The NFSD also had a "Mobile division" with red fezzes that participated in parades and celebrations.

== Degrees ==
The Frat had an elaborate ritual, loosely based on Masonic practice. Each member took an oath of secrecy during their initiation. The Degree system was adopted in 1947, reflecting the Masonic influence from the Coming Men of America. The second degree was called the 5th, and required the candidate to have held office or served on a committee. The third degree was called the 10th, fourth (15th), fifth (20th), sixth (25th), seventh (30th). The 34th degree required written examination on the laws and history of the order.

Each of these degrees required different commitments. 5th: Oath of membership and being a subordinate division officer 1 year or 2 committee chairmanships; 10th: Officer for at least 2 years; 15th: Officer for 3 years; 20th: Officer for 5 years; 25th: All of the above and passing a written exam on the laws and history of the order; 30th applies to grand (national) officers only, who must hold grand office for at least one year; and 34th: All of the above and accumulating 100–2000 "points" by performing extraordinary service in addition to holding office There were some that continued service beyond the requirements for 34th Degree, and the NFSD eventually recognized these individuals with the "Gold Circle" award.

== Services ==
Some of the initiatives undertaken by the NFSD through the years included donating clothing and other items to the aged deaf and to hospitals, donating toys and clothing to needy children, working to help advance legislation to help the deaf, fighting discrimination against the deaf, helping remove barriers then in place that prevented the deaf from legally operating a motor vehicle, and educating the public about deaf (and impostor) peddlers.

== See also ==
- National Association of the Deaf (United States)
