= Virginia Richmond Reynolds =

American painter (1866–1903)

Virginia Richmond Reynolds (1866 – 1903) was an American artist particularly known for her portrait miniatures. She was also an influential teacher of the genre.

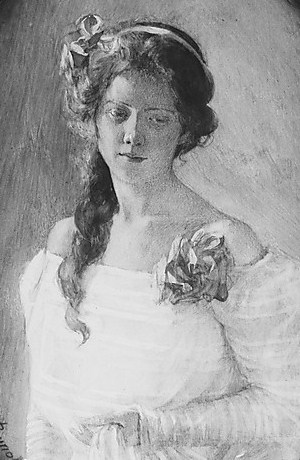

== Early life and education ==
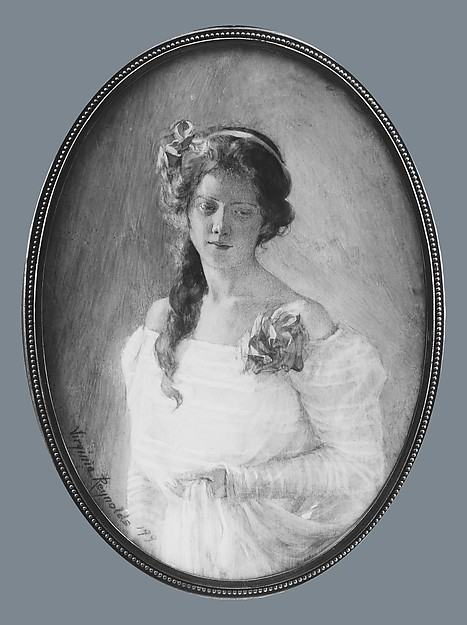
Portrait of Bessie Moore, 1899, Metropolitan Museum of Art

Reynolds was born in Chicago, and studied first at the Art Institute of Chicago and then in Munich with Carl Marr. While in Munich she married Wellington Jarard Reynolds who was also an art student there. The couple moved to Paris where Virginia continued her studies under the American impressionist painter Charles Augustus Lasar and began exhibiting her work.

== Career ==
Her miniature portrait of a Dutch girl at the American Art Association of Paris show of 1896 was the only work by a woman on display. The success of her miniatures at the Salon de Champ-de-Mars exhibition in 1898 led to her being elected as an Associate of the Société Nationale des Beaux-Arts. She also established her own school of miniature painting in Paris where her students included Lucy May Stanton, Eda Nemoede Casterton and Cornelia Ellis Hildebrandt. Rosina Cox Boardman was also influenced by her style.

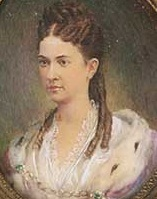
Detail from Woman in an Ermine Lined Cape, circa 1890, watercolor on ivory

Reynolds was one of the founding members of the American Society of Miniature Painters in 1899 and periodically returned to Chicago where she had a studio and taught the first course in miniature painting at the Art Institute of Chicago. She died at the age of 37 from an embolism while on vacation with her family in Lake Geneva, Wisconsin. After her death, her husband remained in Chicago, teaching at the Art Institute and continuing his career as a painter. He died there in 1949.

Reynold's technique of miniature painting, and one which she introduced to her students, involved freer, more "expressionistic" parallel brush strokes. Her portrait of Bessie Moore was one of three which she exhibited at the 1900 Exposition Universelle in Paris and is now in the collection of the Metropolitan Museum of Art in New York City.
