= Rosina Cox Boardman =

American painter

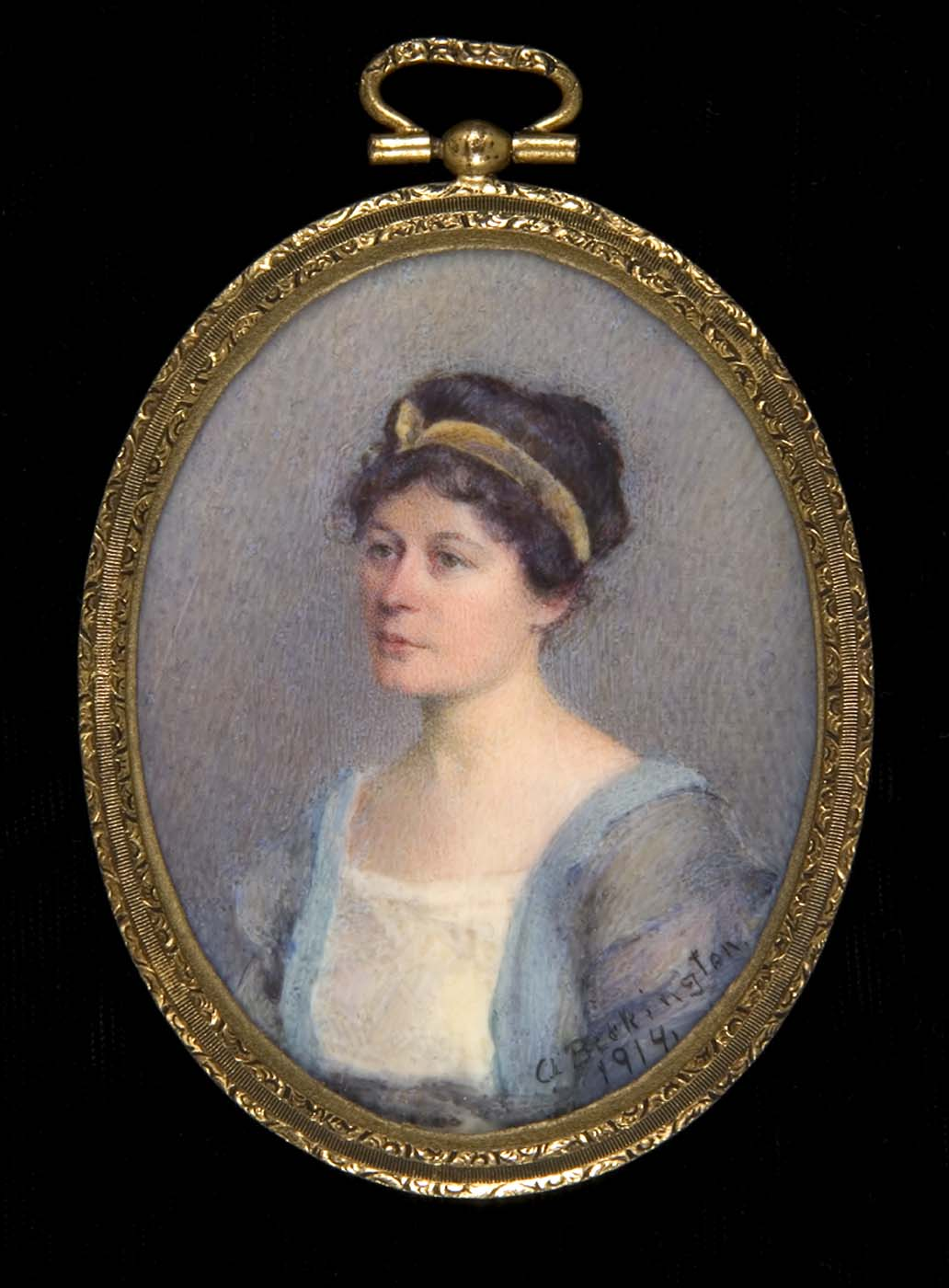
- Rosina Cox Boardman, painted by Alice Beckington
- Born: 1878; New York City
- Died: 1970 (aged 91–92); Huntington
- Occupation: Painter

Rosina Cox Boardman (1878–1970) was an American painter of portrait miniatures and botanical illustrations.

== Early life ==
Born in New York City in 1878, Boardman was a descendant of several of the oldest families in the state, including the Livingstons and Schuylers. She studied at the Art Students League of New York, the New York School of Applied Design, and the Chase School of Art; among her instructors were George Bridgman, Frank Vincent DuMond, and Alice Beckington.

== Career ==
She often showed her work and won prizes, including, in 1930 and 1938, the Levantia White Boardman Memorial Medal of the American Society of Miniature Painters, which she had endowed in honor of her mother. In 1933, she was called by Time Magazine one of the best miniaturists in the country due to her application of contemporary techniques, such as those learned from Virginia Richmond Reynolds. She was described as a rebel. When the American Society of Miniature Painters disbanded in 1965 it was Boardman who, along with Alexandrina Robertson Harris, negotiated the gift of twenty-two miniatures from its members to the Smithsonian Institution.

Boardman died in Huntington, New York.

=== Prominent collections ===
Two works by Boardman, including a self-portrait, are in the collection of the Metropolitan Museum of Art. Others are found in the collections of Worcester Art Museum, the Yale University Art Gallery, and the Brooklyn Museum of Art. A portrait of Boardman by her teacher Alice Beckington is owned by the Smithsonian American Art Museum, which also owns portraits of her by Lydia Longacre and Mabel Rose Welch. It also owns a single work by Boardman herself, The Green Ring of 1935.
