= Robert William Chapman (scholar) =

British scholar (1881–1960)

Robert William Chapman (5 October 1881 in Eskbank, Scotland – 20 April 1960 in Oxford), usually known in print as R. W. Chapman, was a British scholar, book collector and editor of the works of Samuel Johnson and Jane Austen.

== Life ==
Chapman was the youngest of six children born to an Anglican clergyman, who died when he was three years old. He was educated at the High School of Dundee, St Andrews University and Oriel College, Oxford, where he graduated with a First in classics and humanities. He worked as assistant to the secretary of the Clarendon Press. In 1913 he married Katherine Marion Metcalfe, an English tutor at Somerville College. Chapman did military service in Salonika during World War I, managing to study the works of Johnson there and continue to write for the Times Literary Supplement.

After the war Chapman would remain in Oxford until his death. In 1920 he succeeded Charles Cannan as secretary of the Clarendon Press. He played a part in producing the Oxford English Dictionary, combining editorial and administrative responsibilities at the press.

Although Chapman is generally credited as the scholar who established Austen’s canonical status in the twentieth century, his wife played a key role in igniting his interest in book collecting as well as Jane Austen’s works. He himself cited her antiquarian interests as the inspiration of his book collecting career, and her editions of Pride and Prejudice and Northanger Abbey both preceded Chapman’s own. Her contribution to his work is self-evident in her ubiquitous handwriting in the Chapman archives. However, Chapman’s own negligence in acknowledging his wife’s contribution to his Jane Austen edition caused her work to go uncredited until later scholars such as David Gilson, Kathryn Sutherland, and Janine Barchas proved otherwise.

In 1923 Chapman produced an edition of five novels of Jane Austen. He edited an annotated transcription of her incomplete manuscript of Sanditon, published in 1925 as Fragment of a Novel Written by Jane Austen. Further Austen miscellanea were published separately in the 1920s and 1930s before being collected together as a sixth volume, Minor Works, of The Novels of Jane Austen. He also edited (1932) Austen's correspondence, though this involved him in some controversy with Austen's critics.

After retirement from the Clarendon Press in 1943, Chapman worked on "what many consider his greatest accomplishment": a three-volume edition (1952) of Samuel Johnson's letters.

In 1948, Chapman rejected the authenticity of the Rice portrait of Jane Austen based on costume evidence.

== Works ==
- The Portrait of a Scholar and Other Essays Written in Macedonia 1916-1918, London: Humphrey Milford, Oxford University Press, 1920
- (ed.) Selections from Boswell's Life of Samuel Johnson, Oxford: Clarendon Press, 1922
- (ed.) The Novels of Jane Austen: The Text Based on Collation of the Early Editions, 5 vols, Oxford: Clarendon Press, 1923; revised, 1933
- (ed.) Johnson's Journey to the Western Islands of Scotland and Boswell's Journal of a Tour to the Hebrides with Samuel Johnson, LL.D, London: Oxford University Press, 1924; in Oxford Standard Authors, 1930, much reprinted.
- (ed.) Boswell's Note Book, 1776-1777: Recording Particulars of Johnson's Early Life, communicated by him and others in those years, London: Humphrey Milford "The Oxford Miscellany," 1925 [n.b., Preface signed "R.W.C."]
- (ed.) Fragment of a Novel Written by Jane Austen, January-March 1817, Oxford: Clarendon Press, 1925
- (ed.) Samuel Johnson, Selected Letters, [ed. R.W. Chapman]. Oxford: Oxford University Press "World’s Classics" no. 282, 1925
- (ed.) Papers Written by Dr. Johnson and Dr. Dodd, 1777 (1926)
- (ed.) Samuel Johnson, The History of Rasselas, Prince of Abissinia: A Tale, Oxford: Clarendon Press, 1927
- (ed.) Johnson and Boswell Revised by themselves and Others (1928)
- Johnson, Boswell and Mrs. Piozzi: a Suppressed Passage Restored (1929)
- (ed.) Jane Austen's Letters to Her Sister Cassandra and Others, 2 vols, Oxford: Clarendon Press, 1932; revised, 1952
- Names, Designations and Appellations, SPE Tract no. 47, Oxford: Clarendon Press and the Society for Pure English, 1936
- Adjectives from Proper Names (1939)
- Johnsonian Bibliography: A Supplement to Courtney, Chapman with the collaboration of Allen T. Hazen, Oxford Bibliographical Society, v. 5, 1940
- (ed.) The Letters of Samuel Johnson: With Mrs Thrale's Genuine Letters to Him, 3 vols, Oxford: Clarendon Press, 1952
- (ed.) Boswell's Life of Johnson, intro. by C.B. Tinker. Oxford: Oxford University Press "Oxford Standard Authors," 1953
- Johnsonian and Other Essays and Reviews, Oxford: Clarendon Press, 1953
- (ed.) Selections from Samuel Johnson, 1709-1784, London: Oxford University Press, 1955; reprinted in "The World's Classics," no. 586, 1962
- (rev. and enlarged) Annals of English literature, 1475-1950; the principal publications of each year, together with an alphabetical index of authors with their works, by J. C. Ghosh & E. G. Withycombe, Oxford: Clarendon Press, 1961
