= Harper's Young People =

American children's magazine

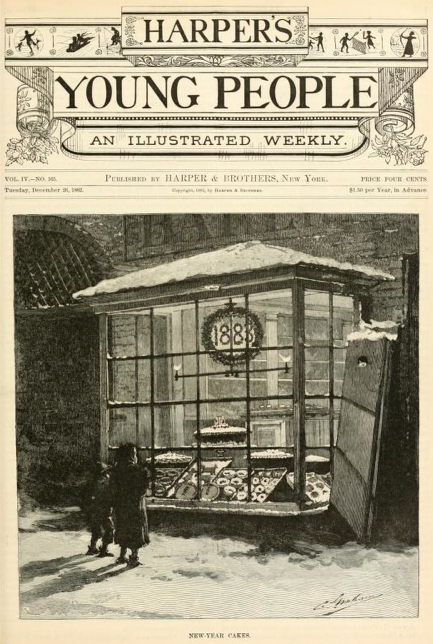
- Harper's Young People, Dec. 26, 1882
- Categories: Children's magazine
- First issue: 1879
- Final issue: 1899
- Company: Harper and Brothers
- Country: United States
- Language: English

Harper's Young People was an American children's magazine between 1879 and 1899. The first issue appeared in the fall of 1879. It was published by Harper & Brothers. It was Harper's fourth magazine to be established, after Harper's Magazine (1850), Harper's Weekly (1857), and Harper's Bazaar (1867). Harper's Young People was the first of the four magazines to cease publication.

Harper's Young People began in November 1879 as a weekly illustrated 16-page magazine that contained fiction and non-fiction works. Its first editor (1879–1881) was Kirk Munroe. It was advertised as being appropriate for boys and girls ages six to 16. It was renamed Harper's Round Table and it changed its target demographic to teenage boys beginning with volume XVI number 809 at the end of April 1895. The magazine ceased publication in 1899.

The Star Monthly, the organ of the Coming Men of America, absorbed the goodwill and subscription list of Harper's Round Table in 1900 or 1901.
