= Coming Men of America =

American secret society (est. 1892)

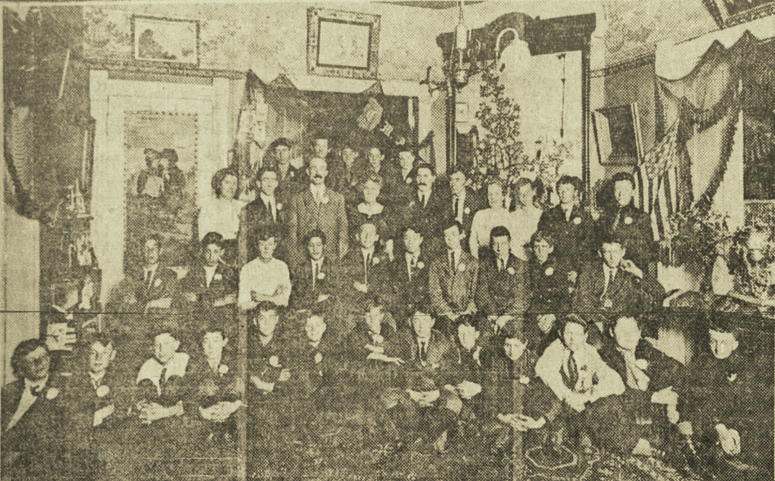
- CMA in Minneapolis, Minnesota, 1912
- Abbreviation: CMA
- Formation: 1892
- Founder: Joseph R. Hunter
- Founded at: Oak Park, Illinois
- Purpose: promoting interest in public affairs; teaching fraternity and sociability; encouraging literary tastes
- Headquarters: Oak Park, Illinois
- Products: official organ
- Secretary General: Joseph R. Hunter
- Main organ: The Star Monthly
- Affiliations: Masons

Coming Men of America (CMA) was a secret society of boys and young men. Founded in the United States in 1892, it spread to Canada and Mexico. The CMA was organized by boys themselves, in imitation of the fraternities or lodges of older persons, and was exploited by a magazine mainly as a device for extending circulation.

== History ==
In the summer of 1892, Joseph R. Hunter, at that time a boy in his teens, organized a "secret society" among his friends and class at Oak Park, Illinois. It began as a school children's club, under the auspices and with the active co-operation of the brother, a thirty-second degree Freemason, who was at the same time an Odd Fellow, a Mystic Shriner, and a member of several other secret societies. The older brother was called upon to assist in preparing the secret work and initiation, in imitation of such ideas of Masons, Odd-Fellows, and others.

As the lodge grew and prospered, new features were added, and a finally, in the summer of 1894 it was organized under the name of The Coming Men of America. On March 13, 1895, it was granted a certificate and charter by the state of Illinois, which gave it the power to enroll members, organize lodges, and conduct meetings.

Organized two years later, by December 31, 1894, the membership was 600. One year later, it was 4,000, and at the end of the fifth year, it was 20,000. In 1906, it was almost 100,000, with about 5,000 charters granted in the U.S., Canada, and Mexico by the Grand lodge.

When it spread to Canada, by 1905, the Quebec La Vérité made an investigation. By 1907, the organization was represented in every State and U.S. Territory, and the CMA claimed to be the greatest chartered secret society for boys and young men in the U.S.

== Organization ==
The CMA was a secret society of boys and young men, from age 14 to 21. It gathered its members mostly in high schools, colleges, and universities.

Its object was the promoting of interest in public affairs among the coming men of the country. It also taught fraternity, sociability, and encouraged literary tastes. Politics and religion were eschewed. The only requirements to membership were integrity, morality, age, and amiability.

Its meetings were first held in a basement. On this basis, older men aided in its development, so that it would be a good example of the boy-imitative helped out by parents. It spread with the approval of the Masons, who lent it their halls for meetings.

Boys traveled on its badge. There was a badge, sign, and a secret sign language called "bestography." The motto was "Our Turn Next" (OTN). The organization's secret ritual work was highly praised. Its membership was limited to Caucasian boys under the age of twenty-one.

Unlike some other secret societies, degrees were conferred for work for the lodge, deeds of bravery, and other similar actions. The degree members had a special certificate and secret work for the fifth, tenth, and fifteenth degrees. Another feature of the CMA was the post of the uniform rank, which were formed in lodges that had 12 or more members.

There were no annual dues in the CMA. Instead of this, each member, to keep in good standing, was required to keep up his subscription to The Star Monthly, the official organ, and the traveling card which was sent him each time he renews, was the proof that he was in good-standing.

== Publications ==
The official paper, The Star Monthly made its appearance in August 1894. It was an illustrated magazine with at least 32 pages each month. The covers were printed in color. Departments included Athletics, Games, Carpentry, Mechanics, Electricity, Puzzles, History, Photography, Coins, Curios, Stamps, and Amateur Journalism. Prize awards were given out in each department every month.

This paper absorbed the goodwill and subscription list of Harper's Round Table in 1900 or 1901.

The CMA was characterized as a club for subscribers to a periodical, The Star Monthly being its official organ.

== Notable people ==
C. R. Phillip served as president, and Hunter was the Grand Secretary. W. M. C. Foster, of Oak park, was adjutant general of the uniform rank.
