= Swedish Club of Chicago =

- U.S. National Register of Historic Places
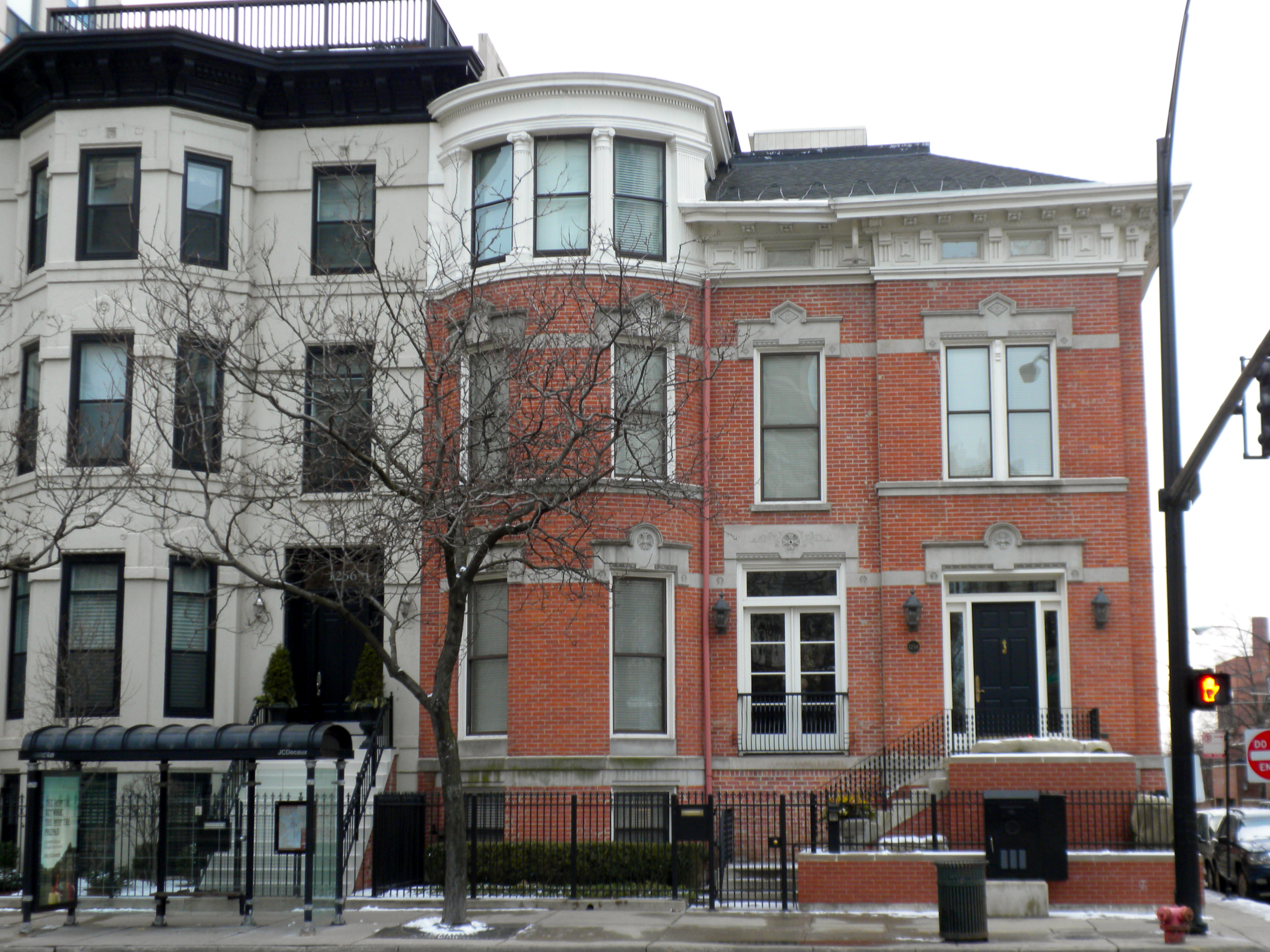

- Location within Chicago metropolitan area
- Location: 1258 N. LaSalle Street, Chicago, Illinois
- Coordinates: 41°54′20″N 87°38′00″W
- Built: 1870
- NRHP reference No.: 85003031
- Added to NRHP: December 2, 1985

The Swedish Club of Chicago is a historic building located in Chicago, Illinois. During the late 19th century the Swedish Club was an important center for the Swedish American immigrant community in Chicago, in a neighborhood that was known then as Swede Town.
