= Samuel Dixon (artist) =

Irish artist, known for his water colour paintings

- Died: 27 January 1769; London
- Citizenship: Kingdom of Great Britain
- Occupation(s): Artist, printer
- Known for: Basso-relievo prints

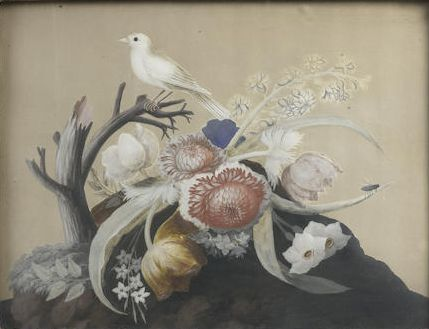
embossed picture depicting a canary perched on a bough

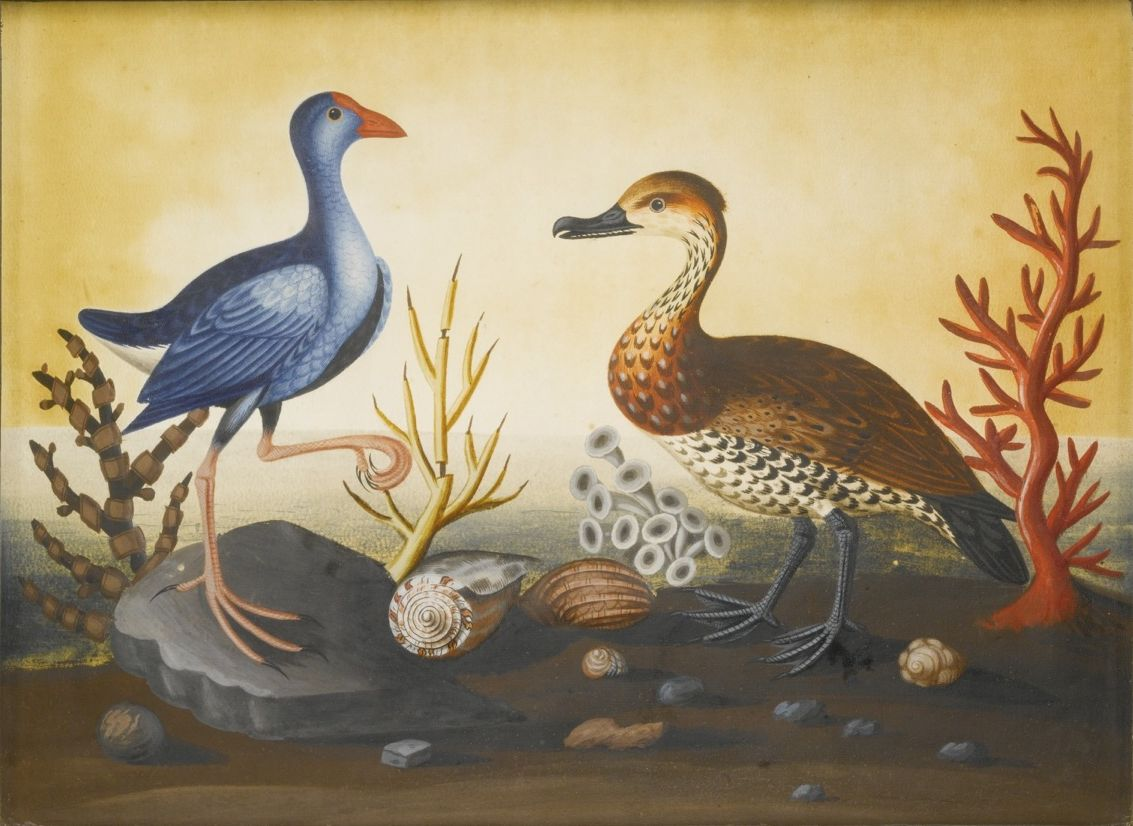
A print from a set of twelve

Samuel Dixon (died 1769) was an Irish artist, known for his water colour paintings and his depictions of flowers and birds in basso-relievo (embossed papier-mâché).

Dixon's father was Thomas Dixon, a hosier, of Cork Hill. His brother John Dixon, was a mezzotint engraver.

In 1748, he was listed as a "picture dealer and painter" in Capel Street, Dublin, Ireland.

Dixon produced sets of twelve hand-coloured basso-relievo prints. He advertised the first, featuring floral arrangements, in Faulkner's Dublin Journal on 26 April 1748. The next year he followed these with a set of designs copied from volumes 1–4 of George Edward's Natural History of Uncommon Birds (1743–1751).

He employed a number of apprentices or pupils to hand-colour his prints, among them was Gustavus Hamilton, Daniel O'Keeffe and James Reilly.

In later life he opened a shop in London and exhibited his works there, returning to Dublin in 1768. He returned to London, and died there on 27 January 1769.
