= Eda Nemoede Casterton =

American painter

- Born: Eda Nemoede; April 14, 1877; Brillion, Wisconsin, US
- Died: November 15, 1969 (aged 92); Palos Verdes Estates, California, US
- Education: School of the Art Institute of Chicago
- Known for: Painting

Eda Nemoede Casterton (April 14, 1877 – November 15, 1969) was an American painter known specifically for her portrait miniatures in watercolor, pastels and oil. She exhibited works at the Paris Salon and the San Francisco Panama–Pacific International Exposition of 1915, among others. Her works are at the Smithsonian American Art Museum and the Brooklyn Museum.

== Early life ==
Eda Wilhelmina Nemoede was born in Brillion, Wisconsin, on April 14, 1877 to Edward Carl Ludwig Nemoede, a harnessmaker, and Maria Georgina Bastian of German ancestry. They had 11 children, eight of whom reached adulthood. Her siblings were Bertha, 16 years her senior; Agnes; Rudolph; Anna; Hattie; Herman; and Alma Caroline.

Against the wishes of her teacher and family, she painted on the walls of her schoolhouse as a young girl. She wanted to become an artist. According to her parents wishes, she studied to become a stenographer and then worked for attorney Peter Martineau as a secretary. Following the death of her father March 6, 1895, in Oconto, Wisconsin, Casterton lived in Chicago with her mother and her sisters Hattie and Alma Caroline and worked as a stenographer.

== Education ==
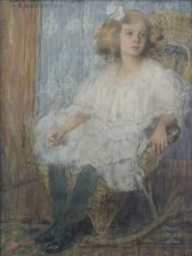
Eda Nemoede Casterton, Mae Olson, watercolor on ivory, 1906, Brooklyn Museum

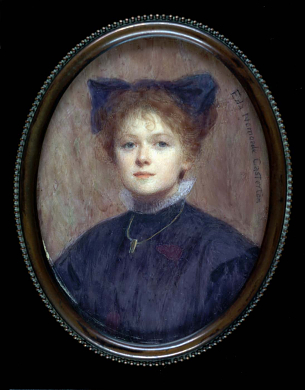
Eda Nemoede Casterton, Miss Goss, watercolor on ivory, c. 1912, Smithsonian American Art Museum

Nemoede studied at the Minnesota or Minneapolis School of Fine Arts. When she worked as a stenographer, she spent her lunch hours at the School of the Art Institute of Chicago, where she studied with Virginia Richmond Reynolds, considered the most accomplished miniature American painter of the time. Of painting miniatures, Casterton said that they were "small paintings painted in a big way."

After she began working as an artist, she took more classes and completed commissioned works of art with her teacher. In France, Casterton studied with Henry Salem Hubbell and exhibited her works at the Paris Salon, where she received an honorable mention in 1905.

== Career ==
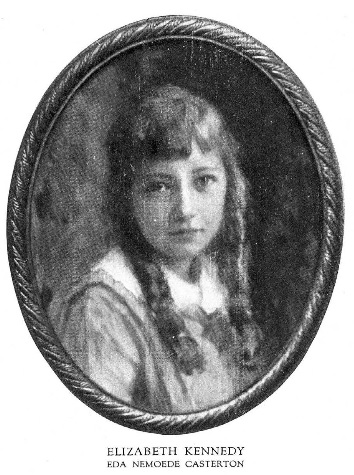
Eda Nemoede Casterton, Elizabeth Kennedy, miniature portrait, black and white photograph, Shown at 1918 Chicago Society of Miniature Painters Exhibition, Art Institute of Chicago

=== Artist and instructor ===
She began by painting watercolor on thin sheets of ivory, like the portraits Miss Goss and Little Girl. An article in the Chicago Chronicle, dated June 21, 1903, stated, "Eda Nemoede bids fair to become one of the greatest miniature painters of America and those who have seen her work praise it unstintingly." Her work was described, "Each is a well-realized, strongly modeled, carefully detailed portrait. They were praised for their poetic evocation of mood as well as fidelity to physical likeness. The skin tones are clear and delicate" in the article When Small is Big.

She enjoyed painting children, having said "I want to paint children in the sunshine, young girls out of doors with the wind in their hair and the sky's deep blue in their eyes."

She exhibited several portraits and was on the Art Committee for the annual Art Institute of Chicago in 1907. Casterton returned from Paris in 1908 and began teaching at the Art Institute of Chicago.

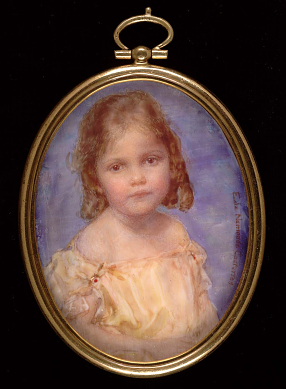
Eda Nemoede Casterton, Little Girl, watercolor on ivory, 1920, Smithsonian American Art Museum. This may have been the painting of a young girl in an off-the-shoulder dress entitled Mary Beth that was exhibited in Brooklyn in 1926.

After she married, Casterton created works of art in oil or pastels, as well as watercolor miniatures. In 1913, she exhibited a portrait of her daughter, Jane, at the annual Art Institute of Chicago exhibition. She exhibited Mae Olson (1906) at the City Art Museum of St. Louis in 1916. She exhibited four miniature portraits at the 1918 exhibition for the Chicago Society of Miniature Painters, including Elizabeth Kennedy.

Even as miniature paintings become less popular, she was a successful artist and received international recognition. She began making full-size portraits in the 1920s, including having patterned a work after a U.S. Army lieutenant made during Thomas Jefferson's presidency. She exhibited her works in solo and group exhibitions.

Her works are held by the Smithsonian Institution, The Brooklyn Museum and The John H. Vanderpoel Art Association.

=== Recognition and memberships ===
Casterton received Honorable Mention at the International Art Union (Paris) in 1907 and 1908, was awarded a Silver Medal at the Panama-Pacific International Exposition of 1915, and a Bronze medal at the Sesqui-Centennial Exposition at Philadelphia of 1926.

Casterton was a member of the American Society of Miniature Painters, British Royal Society of Miniature Painters, Royal Society of Miniature Painters, and the Pennsylvania Societies of Miniature Painters. In 1914 she was the vice president of the Chicago Societies of Miniature Painters. Between 1949 and 1951 she received awards at the League of the American Pen Women Exhibitions.

== Personal life ==
In 1910, Casterton worked in Chicago as an artist and supported her mother and nieces, Eda L. and Alta V. Nemoede.

On June 29, 1911, Eda Nemoede married William John Casterton in Chicago. Their first daughter, Jane was born in 1912. Their second daughter, Virginia was born in February 1917. Casterton was a Christian Scientist.

William Casterton died February 9, 1948, in Evanston, Illinois. In 1952, she moved to Missoula, Montana, where she worked as an artist and lived with her sister. She died November 15, 1969, at Palos Verdes Estates, California, at 92 years of age.
