= Breta Longacre =

American painter

Breta Longacre, later Del Mar (August 31, 1887 - July 10, 1923), was an American painter.

Born in Baltimore, Longacre was the daughter of Andrew Longacre, a Methodist minister who also engraved and painted watercolors; he in turn was the son of engraver James Barton Longacre. Her sister Lydia would go on to become a portrait miniaturist of some note. Breta studied at the Art Students League of New York, and was likely stylistically influenced by her sister, through whose agency she discovered Florence Griswold and the artists' colony at Old Lyme, Connecticut. She exhibited work there in 1914 and 1915. On January 31, 1918, she married electrical engineer William Alexander Del Mar in New York, settling with him in Greenwich. The couple would become the parents of three children. She continued painting, exhibiting her works, which have been called "delicate" and "impressionistic" in style, at the National Academy of Design. She was a member of the National Association of Women Painters and Sculptors and the Society of American Women Artists. Longacre died in Greenwich, and is buried there in the Putnam Cemetery. The Greenwich Public Library held a public show of her work in 1937 to mark the fiftieth anniversary of her birth. Three of Longacre's paintings are currently owned by the Florence Griswold Museum in Old Lyme, which is also said to own a 1914 portrait of her, The Blue Kimono, by her sister. The museum also has in its collection the actual blue kimono Breta wore when posing for this painting.
