= Portrait miniature =

Miniature portrait painting

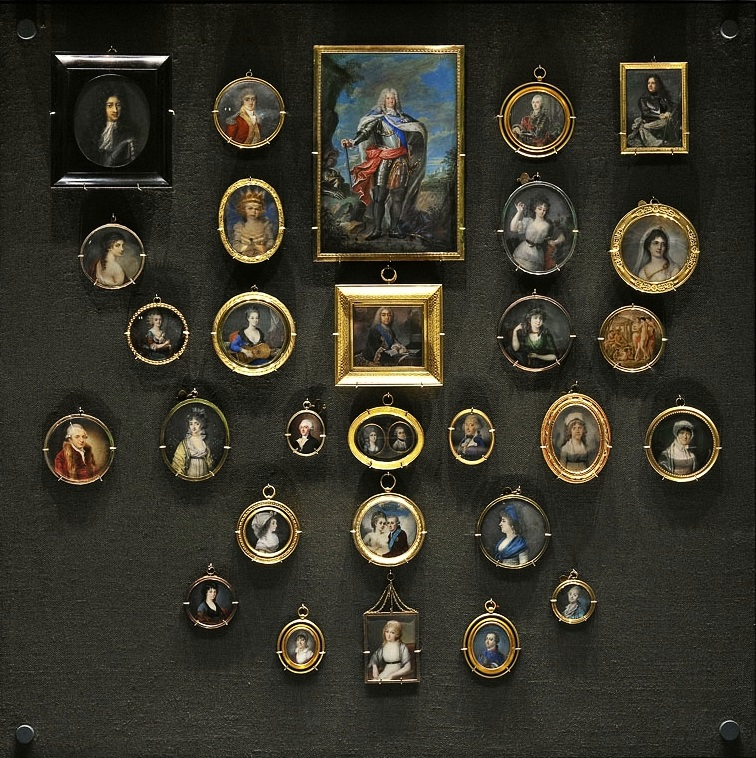
A display case with 18th-century portrait miniatures at the National Museum in Warsaw.

A portrait miniature is a miniature portrait painting in a genre that arose from Renaissance art, often executed in gouache, watercolour, or enamel. Portrait miniatures developed out of the techniques of miniature detailing in illuminated manuscripts, and became popular among 16th-century elites, mainly in England and France. The genre spread across the rest of Europe from the middle of the 18th century, remaining highly popular until the development of daguerreotypes and photography in the mid-19th century. They were usually intimate gifts given within the family, or by hopeful males in courtship, but some rulers, such as King James I of England, gave large numbers as diplomatic or political gifts. They were often painted when a family member was going to be absent for a significant period, whether a husband or son going to war, a loved one emigrating, or a daughter getting married.

The first miniaturists used watercolour to paint on stretched vellum, or (especially in England) on playing cards trimmed to the shape required. The technique was often called limning (as in Nicholas Hilliard's treatise on the Art of Limning of c. 1600), or painting in little. During the second half of the 17th century, vitreous enamel painted on copper became increasingly popular, especially in France. In the 18th century, miniatures were painted with watercolour on ivory, which had now become relatively cheap. As small in size as 40 mm × 30 mm, portrait miniatures were often fitted into lockets, inside watch-covers or pieces of jewellery so that they could be carried on the person. Others were framed with stands or hung on a wall, or fitted into snuff box covers.

== Early period ==
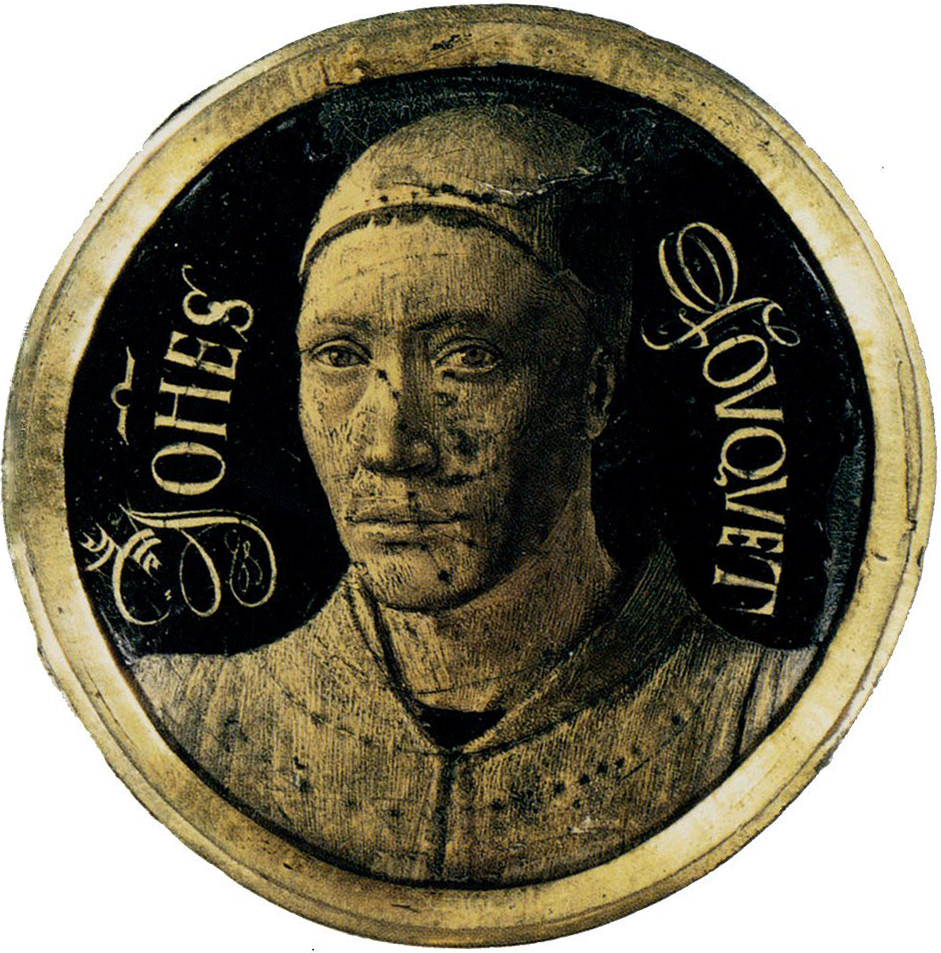
Jean Fouquet, self-portrait (1450). The earliest portrait miniature, and possibly the earliest formal self-portrait. (Note: As distinct from self-portraits inserted into religious or other scenes. Jan van Eyck painted a small probable self-portrait, Portrait of a Man (Self Portrait?), (National Gallery, London) that is dated 1433.)

The portrait miniature developed from the illuminated manuscript, which had been superseded for the purposes of book illustration by techniques such as woodblock and calc printing. The earliest portrait miniaturists were famous manuscript painters like Jean Fouquet (self-portrait of 1450), and Simon Bening, whose daughter Levina Teerlinc mostly painted portrait miniatures, and moved to England, where her predecessor as court artist, Hans Holbein the Younger painted some miniatures. Lucas Horenbout was another Netherlandish miniature painter at the court of Henry VIII.

France also had a strong tradition of miniatures, centred on the court, although this came to concentrate in the mid-16th century on larger images, about the range of sizes of the modern paperback book, which might not qualify as miniatures in the usual sense. These might be paintings, or finished drawings with some colour, and were produced by François Clouet (c. 1510 – 1572), and his followers.

The earliest French miniature painters were Jean Clouet (died c. 1540), his son François Clouet, Jean Perréal and others; but of their work in portraiture we have little trace at the present day, although there are many portraits and a vast number of drawings attributed to them. The seven portraits in the Manuscript of the Gallic War (Bibliothèque Nationale) are assigned to Jean Clouet; and to them may be added a fine work, in the Morgan Library & Museum, representing the Marschal de Brissac. Following these men we find Simon Renard de St. André (1613–1677), and Jean Cotelle. Others whose names might be mentioned were Joseph Werner (1637–1710), and Rosalba Carriera (1675–1757).

The first famous native English portrait miniaturist is Nicholas Hilliard (c. 1537–1619), whose work was conservative in style but very sensitive to the character of the sitter; his best works are beautifully executed. The colours are opaque, and gold is used to heighten the effect, while the paintings are on card. They are often signed, and have frequently also a Latin motto upon them. Hilliard worked for a while in France, and he is probably identical with the painter alluded to in 1577 as Nicholas Belliart. Hilliard was succeeded by his son Lawrence Hilliard (died 1640); his technique was similar to that of his father, but bolder, and his miniatures richer in colour.

Isaac Oliver and his son Peter Oliver succeeded Hilliard. Isaac (c. 1560–1617) was the pupil of Hilliard. Peter (1594–1647) was the pupil of Isaac. The two men were the earliest to give roundness and form to the faces they painted. Peter painted initially very like his father, with tiny, coloured dots, giving the portraits a three-dimensionality. Peter Oliver then developed Isaac's style, loosening the dots, and using softer, broader brush strokes to model the faces. They signed their best works in monogram, and painted not only very small miniatures, but larger ones measuring as much as 250 mm × 230 mm (10 in × 9 in). They copied for Charles I of England (1600–1649) on a small scale many of his famous pictures by the old masters.

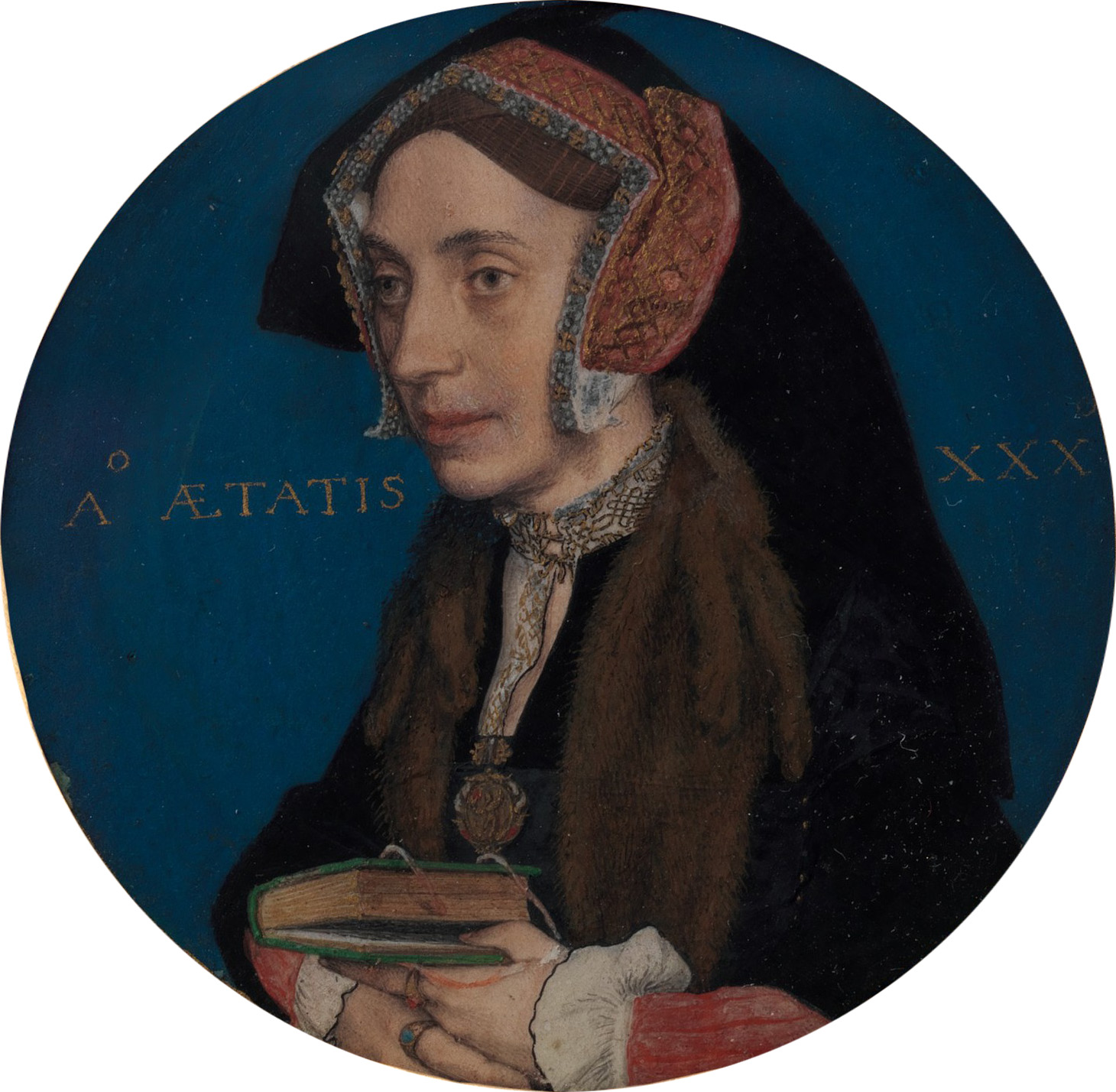
Portrait Miniature of Margaret Roper by Hans Holbein the Younger, c. 1535–36

Other miniaturists at about the same date included Balthazar Gerbier, George Jamesone, Penelope Cleyn and her brothers. John Hoskins (died 1664) was followed by a son of the same name, who was known to have been living in 1700, since a miniature signed by him and bearing that date is in the Pierpont Morgan collection, representing James FitzJames.

Samuel Cooper (1609–1672) was a nephew and student of the elder Hoskins, and is considered the greatest English portrait miniaturist. He spent much of his time in Paris and the Netherlands, and very little is known of his career. His work has a superb breadth and dignity, and has been well called life-size work in little. His portraits of the men of the Puritan epoch are remarkable for their truth to life and strength of handling. He painted upon card, chicken skin and vellum, and on two occasions upon thin pieces of mutton bone. The use of ivory was not introduced until long after his time. His work is frequently signed with his initials, generally in gold, and very often with the addition of the date.

Other miniaturists of this period include Alexander Cooper (died 1660; who painted a series of portraits of the children of the king and queen of Bohemia), David des Granges (1611–1675), Richard Gibson (1615–1690); and Charles Beale the Elder and Mary Beale. They are followed by such artists as Gervase Spencer (died 1763), Bernard Lens III, Nathaniel Hone the Elder, and Jeremiah Meyer, the latter two notable in connection with the foundation of the Royal Academy. The workers in black lead (plumbago, as it was called at that time) must not be overlooked, especially David Loggan, William Faithorne, and John Faber the Elder. They drew with exquisite detail and great effect on paper or vellum.

On 28 April 1733, there was a terrible destruction of portrait miniatures in a fire at White's Chocolate and Coffee House. Sir Andrew Fountaine rented two rooms at White's to temporarily hold his huge collection of portraits done by Hilliard, the Olivers, Samuel Cooper, and others. The entire house burned down; the number of paintings destroyed was so large that the ashes were carefully sifted to recover the gold from the incinerated mountings of the miniatures.

== High period ==
=== Denmark ===
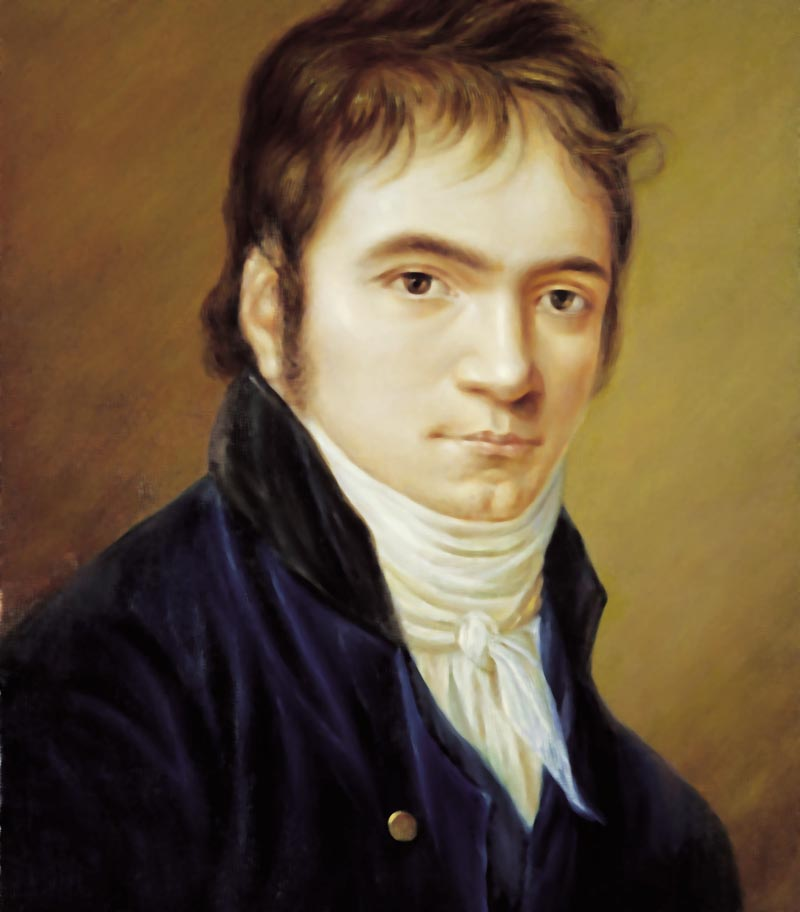
Christian Horneman's miniature portrait of Ludwig van Beethoven (1802).

In Denmark, Cornelius Høyer specialised in miniature painting —often 40 mm × 30 mm (1–1.5 in), or in many case, oval or round in shape— in the second half of the 18th century and was appointed Miniature Painter to the Danish Court in 1769. He also worked at several other European courts and won a considerable international reputation. He was succeeded by Christian Horneman as Denmark's premier proponent of the special trade of miniature portraits. Among his most known works are a portrait of Ludwig van Beethoven from 1802 of which Beethoven was particularly fond—possibly because it presents him to a more handsome appearance than most other portraits.

=== England ===
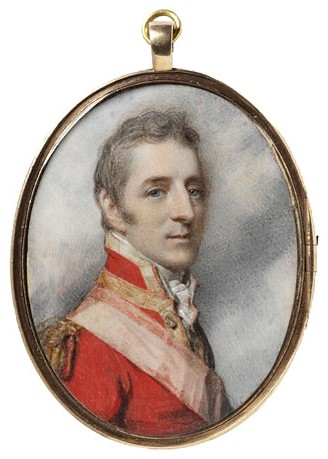
The future Duke of Wellington in 1808, by Richard Cosway.

The 18th century produced a great number of miniature painters, of whom Richard Cosway (1742–1821) is the most famous. His works are of great beauty, and executed with a dash and brilliance which no other artist equalled. His best work was done about 1799. His portraits are generally on ivory, although occasionally he worked on paper or vellum, and he produced a great many full-length pencil drawings on paper, in which he slightly tinted the faces and hands, and these he called "stayned drawings". Cosway's finest miniatures are signed on the back; there is but one genuine signed on the face; very few bear even his initials on the front.

George Engleheart (1750–1829) painted 4,900 miniatures; it is often signed E or G.E. Andrew Plimer (1763–1837) was a pupil of Cosway, and both he and his brother Nathaniel Plimer produced some lovely portraits. The brightness of the eyes, wiriness of the hair, exuberance of colour, combined with forced chiaroscuro and often very inaccurate drawing, are characteristics of Andrew Plimer's work. John Smart (1741–1811) was in some respects the greatest of the 18th-century miniaturists. His work was hailed by contemporaries for his excellence in refinement, power and delicacy; its silky texture and elaborate finish, and the artists love for a brown background. Other notable painters were Richard Crosse (1742–1810), Ozias Humphry (1742–1810), Samuel Shelley (c.1750–1808), whose best pictures are groups of two or more persons, Henry Edridge (1769–1821), John Bogle (1746–1803), and Edward Dayes.

The period also produced an exceptional painter in enamel on copper, Henry Bone R.A. (1755–1864). Bone expanded the size of miniatures that could be produced, working on historical and contemporary portraits, religious and mythical scenes, and old masters. He became the only enamel painter to achieve Royal Academy membership and was appointed as enameller to Kings George III, George IV, and William IV.

=== Colonial India ===
Portrait of a Member of the Tayler Family in 1787, by John Smart. Smart painted similar miniatures for British Soldiers in India during the late 18th century.

The portrait miniature was also used as a tool for notoriety, respect, and promotion especially for the British in Colonial India. Young soldiers sent to India were often done so under the impression that their tour of duty would elevate their status in society, secure a promotion, and prepare them for marriage upon their return. The climate in British occupied India proved to be harsh on complexion and many in British society regarded the physical change harshly. Young men had their portrait commissioned upon arrival to India for mothers, sisters, and spouses to prove that their health and safety were of no concern. The portraits were commissioned by the soldiers to send back to families, many of the portrait miniatures were created by British artists temporarily in India. One such artist was John Smart. Smart spent 1785–1795 in Madras where he was highly sought after by British soldiers. Portrait miniatures commissioned in Colonial India made from ivory are very different from the ones created with canvas and oil; not only due to the cost of the commission themselves but also due to the fragility and risk of packing and shipment. Shipment of ivory portrait miniatures were often taxed more heavily because of the higher risk of damage or loss. Due to the importance placed on status and the cost of shipping, many scholars have concluded the portrait miniatures not only point to the new methods of artistry but also the cultural history of the portrait miniature in Colonial India.

=== Scotland ===
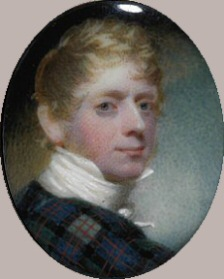
Miniature self-portrait on ivory by Andrew Robertson, 1811. Victoria and Albert Museum.

Andrew Robertson (1777–1845), his brothers Alexander and Archibald also painters, created a style of miniature portrait, which consisted of slightly larger portrait miniatures measuring 23 cm × 18 cm (9 in × 7 in). Robertson's style became dominant in Britain by the middle of the nineteenth century.

=== Ireland ===
Gustavus Hamilton (1739–1775) was a Dublin-based artist, instructed by Robert West at the National College of Art and Design in George's Lane, and was also an apprentice or pupil of Samuel Dixon of Capel Street, where he was employed in colouring the basso-relievo prints of birds and flowers produced by Dixon.

Setting himself up as a miniature painter, he acquired an extensive and fashionable practice, patronised, says John O'Keeffe in his "Recollections", by ladies of the first rank, and making "a power of money by his pencil." From 1765 to 1768, he was living in Parliament Street, then at No. 1 Dame Street, at the house of Stock the hosier, and afterwards in College Green. He contributed miniatures to the Society of Artists from 1765 to 1773. Shortly before his death he moved to Cork Hill, and there died on 16 December 1775, aged 36. He was buried on 18 December at St. Werburgh's Church.

=== France ===
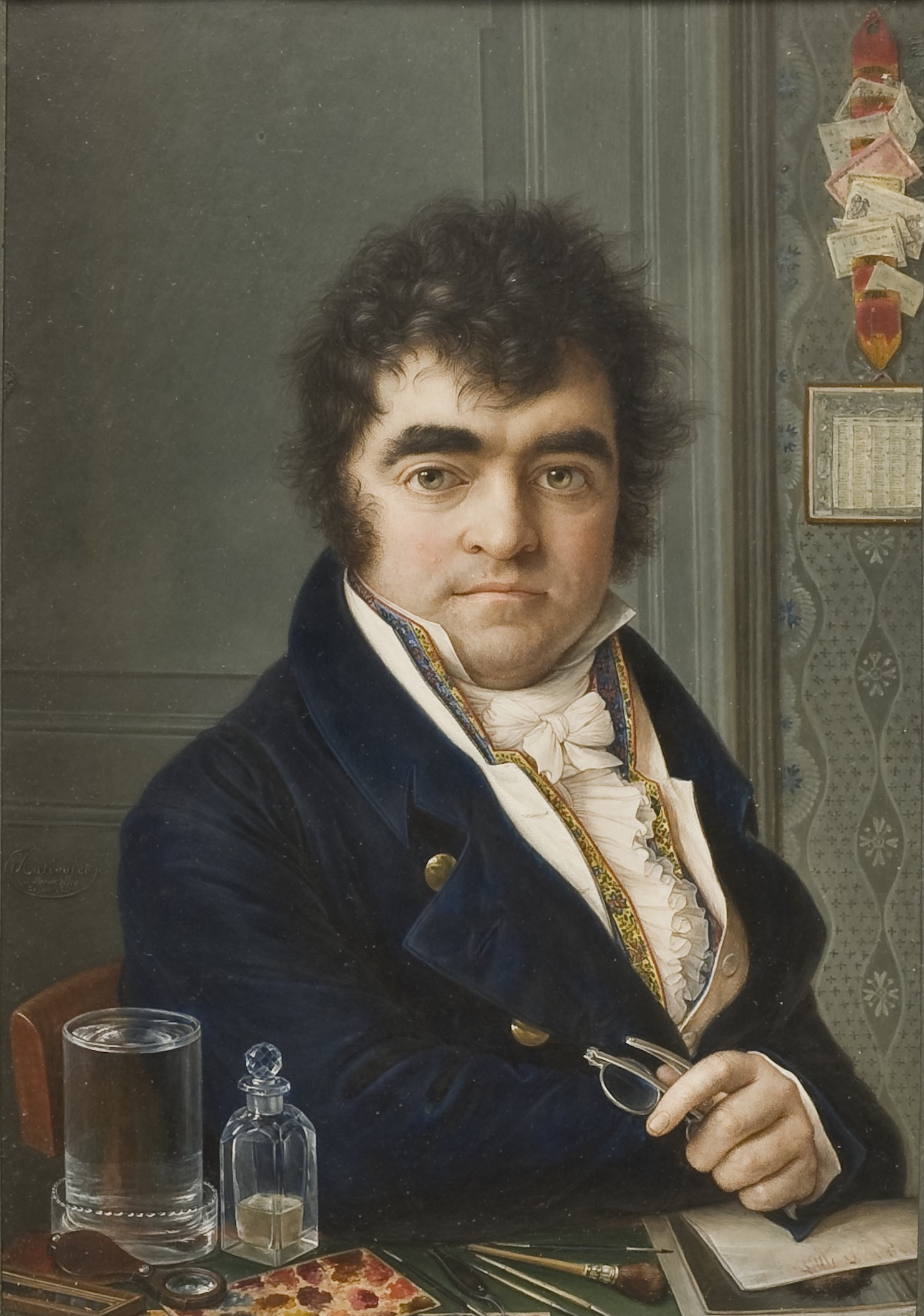
Miniature self-portrait, by Louis-Marie Autissier. In the foreground, the artist's pencils, brushes, and tools for painting miniatures can be seen. Watercolour on ivory, 19.1 cm × 13.5 cm (7.5 in × 5.3 in), 1817, Nationalmuseum.

In the 18th century we know of miniatures by Nicolas de Largillière, François Boucher, Jean-Marc Nattier, and Jean-Germain Drouais; but the greatest names active in France are those of Peter Adolf Hall of Sweden, François Dumont of France, and Friedrich Heinrich Füger of Austria. The tiny pictures painted by the Blarenberghe family are by many persons grouped as miniatures, and some of the later French artists, as Pierre-Paul Prud'hon and Constance Mayer, executed miniature portraits. The popular artists in France, however, were Jean-Baptiste Jacques Augustin (1759–1832) and Jean-Baptiste Isabey (1767–1855). Their portraits of Napoleon and his court are exceedingly fine, and perhaps no other Frenchman painted miniatures so well as did Augustin.

=== Spain ===
Portrait miniatures were used in the Spanish court in the late 15th century, beginning with the political alliance between the English King Henry VII (r. 1485–1509) and Aragonian King Ferdinand II (r. 1479–1519). The alliance celebrated the match between the heirs of Aragon, Catherine (1485–1536), and England, Arthur (1486–1502), with the Treaty of Medina del Campo in 1489. The promise of marriage commenced in the exchange of gifts including jewels and portrait miniatures of the young couple. The popularity of portrait miniatures to commemorate the promise of marriage began to circulate in each court soon after, especially Spain. The tokens of portrait miniatures to commemorate an alliance through marriage were considered extremely intimate and personal to the betrothed couple as well as their families. In Spain as well as the English courts, portrait miniatures were often adorned in jewels or kept in elaborate lockets that could either be concealed or taken out and admired on a whim.

The Spanish painter Francisco Goya (1746–1828) is known to have painted portrait miniatures for mourning and weddings beginning in 1806. The main medium used by Goya was oil but he was also commissioned for pencil miniatures. Between 1824 and 1825, Goya recorded over 40 miniature commissions on ivory while most portrait miniature artists dotted colour onto the ivory, Goya shaped the lines of miniatures using water. Goya claimed his shaping technique was innovative and far different from the 'accidental' ink wash technique developed in 1800s England by Alexander Cozens.

=== Sweden ===
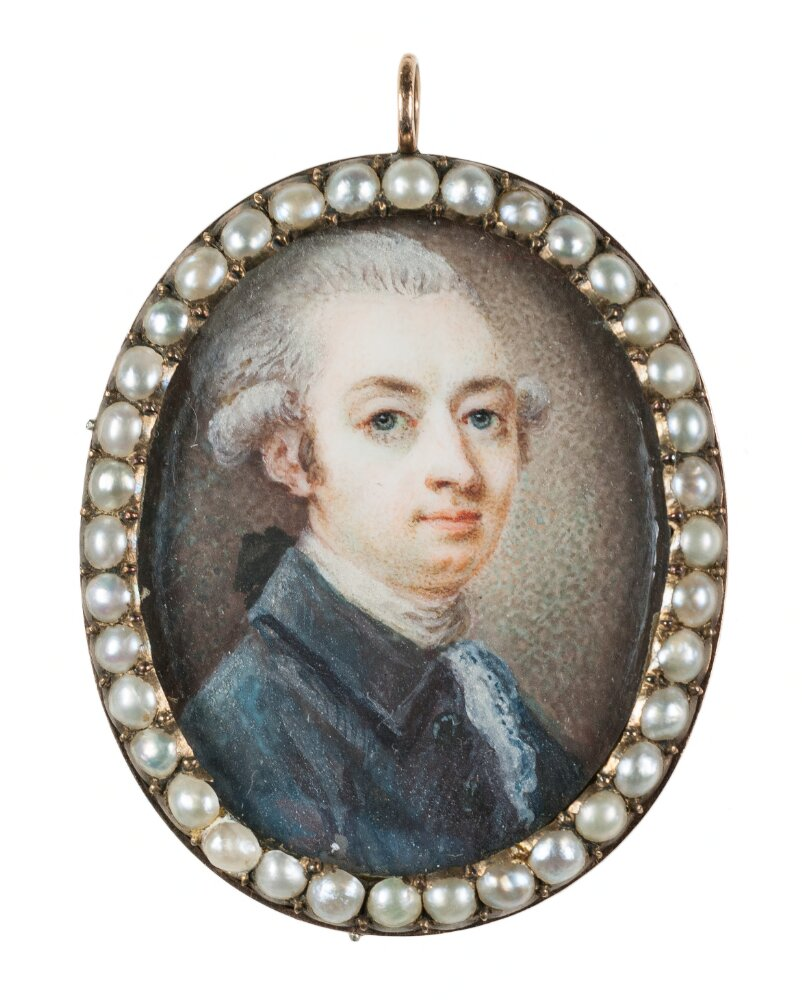
Anton Ulrik Berndes, self-portrait.

Anton Ulrik Berndes played an important role in Swedish art at the end of the 18th century and beginning of the 19th. He produced around 600 portrait miniatures, and received commissions ranging from members of the lower bourgeoisie to the royal court.

=== United States ===
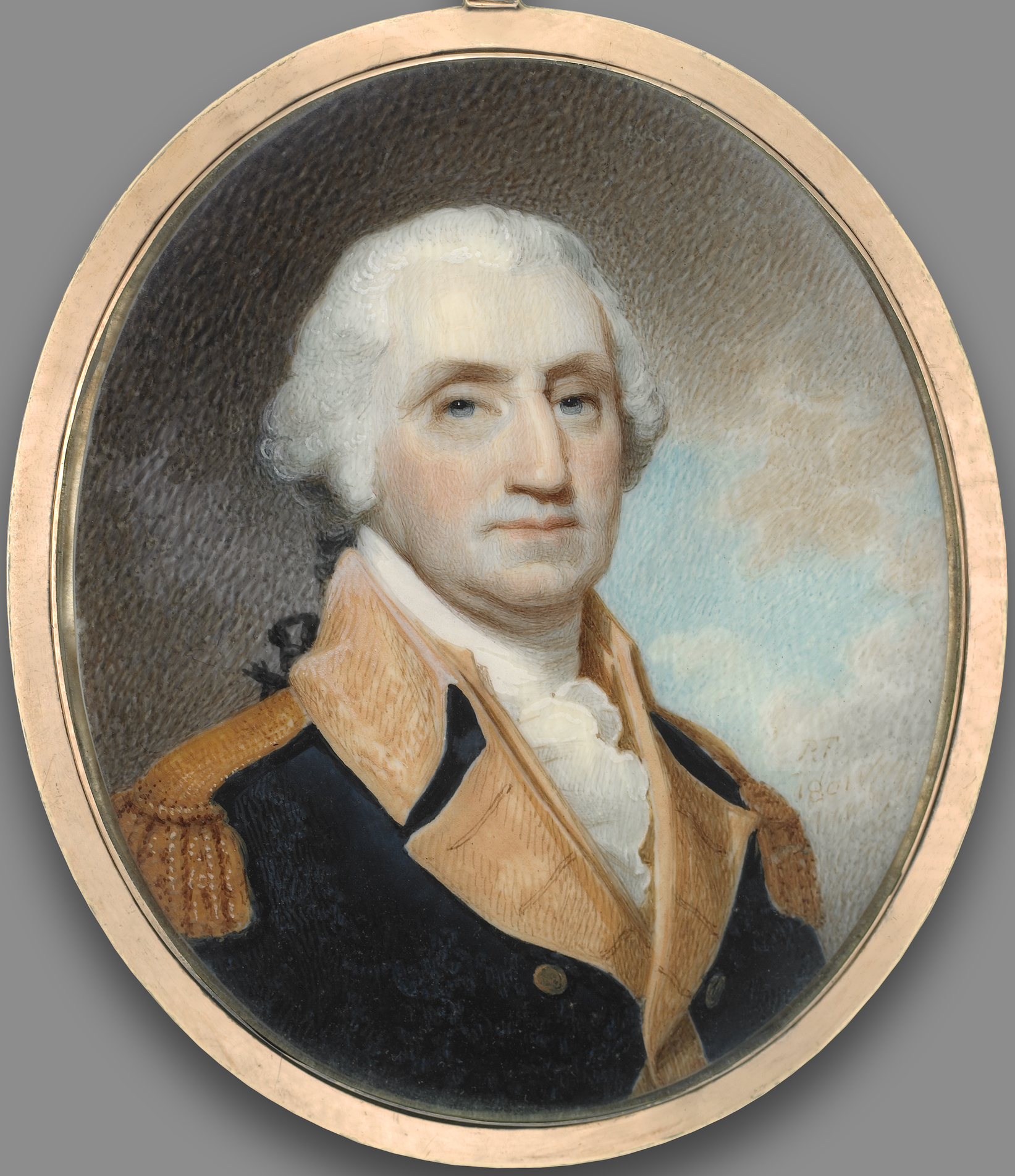
Miniature of George Washington by Robert Field (1800)

The English style of portrait miniatures was also exported to the US colonies; among the earliest recorded US miniaturists is Mary Roberts (died 1761), the first US woman to work in the form. In the late 18th century, Mary Way and her sister Betsey created portraits that included "dressed miniatures", with fabric, ribbons, and lace affixed to the images. Miniaturist Amalia Küssner Coudert (1863–1932), from Terre Haute, Indiana, was known for her portraits of New York socialites and European royalty in the last decade of the 19th century. Recipients of her watercolour on ivory portraits included Caroline Astor, King Edward VII, Czar Nicholas II, and Cecil Rhodes. One of the most famous US miniature painters during the eighteenth century was Robert Field.

Many of the most prominent examples were produced by women artists, among them Eda Nemoede Casterton, who was selected to show her work in the prestigious Paris Salon. Nemoede Casterton used thin sheets of ivory rather than canvas for her paintings, a common practice among miniature portraitists. Around 1900, the United States experienced a revival of miniature portraiture, marked by the 1899 foundation of the American Society of Miniature Painters and the success of artists such as Virginia Richmond Reynolds, Lucy May Stanton, and Cornelia Ellis Hildebrandt. This has been reflected more recently by contemporary realist artists such as Dina Brodsky. Contemporary realist Ann Mikolowski was simultaneously a portrait miniaturist and illustrator of printed matter.

==== Colonial United States ====
Throughout the course of history, mourners have carried portraits with them to honour loved ones; this practice made its way to the Colonial United States in the mid 18th century. Portrait miniatures honouring the deceased could take many forms, such as rings, brooches, lockets, and small frame pictures. Prior to portrait miniatures, loved ones often received tokens of the deceased in the form of rings or lockets with inscriptions or images matching those in the coffin. The matching images and words created a type of bond, allowed surviving family to feel closer to their loved one. A shift in the eighteenth century from mourning death to celebrating life marked a change in the meaning behind tokens carrying morbid inscriptions and images. No longer did the tokens represent the bond between the departed and those left behind, they now represented a grim realisation of mortality. The idea of gender also affected the view of mourning tokens; women were viewed as more emotional to carry tokens and society frowned upon men who carried such tokens. If men were to carry a token of a beloved one, an image of life rather than death would prove to be more becoming.

The first miniature portraits documented in Colonial United States first appeared in the 1750s and may have appeared before then. These portraits were usually commissioned to remember someone who died suddenly from illness at a young age. The family of a twelve year old named Hannah had a locket commissioned to make her look like she did before she become ill. The locket carried a portrait of the young girl and had angel wings above her with the words "NOT LOST" written on the side. Portraits such as these carried hope and remembrance instead of the stigma of constant sorrow.

== Materials and techniques ==
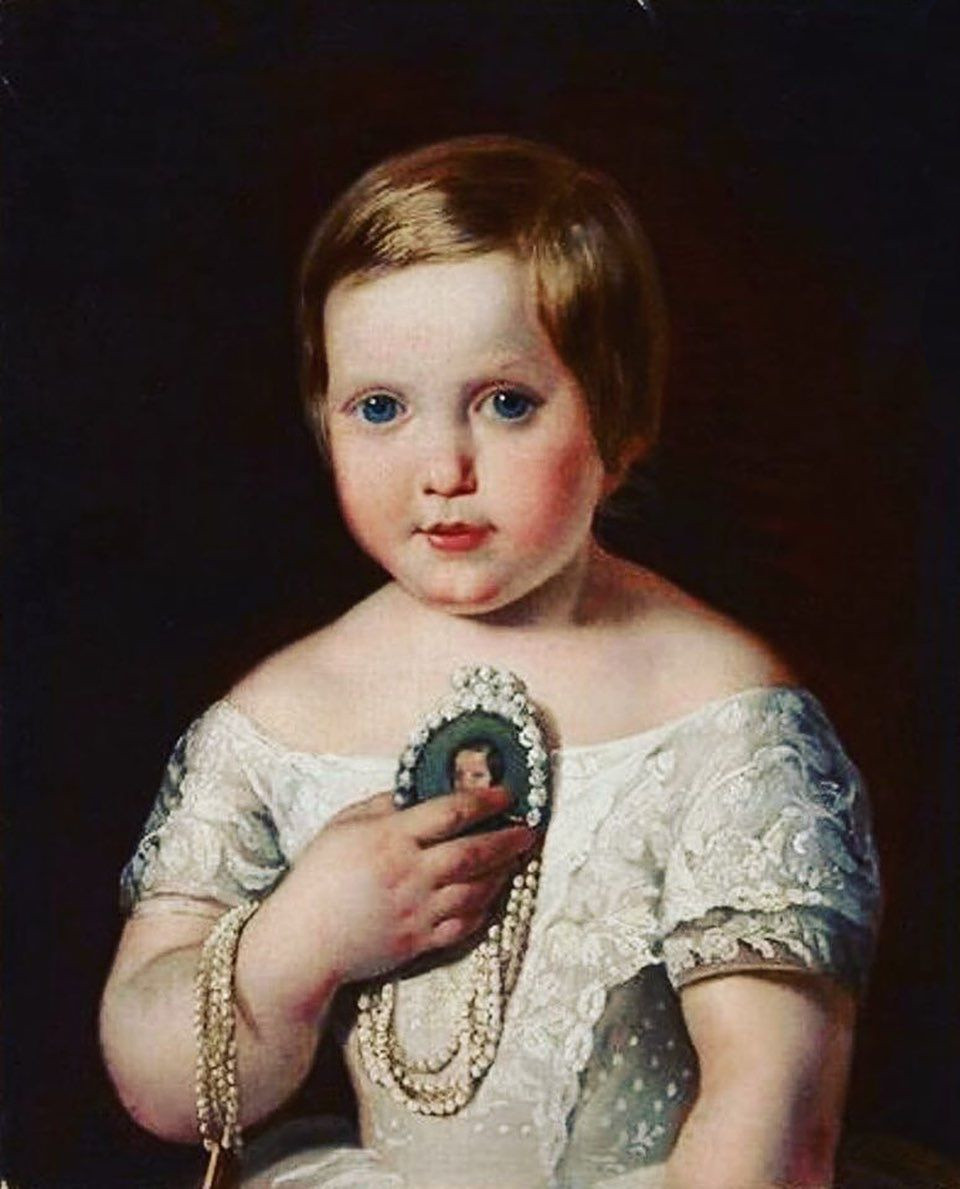
Pedro Afonso, Prince Imperial of Brazil holding a diamond set portrait miniature pendant of his father Emperor Pedro II, 1850

The earliest miniatures were painted on vellum, chicken-skin or cardboard, or by Hilliard and others on the backs of playing cards, and also on very thin vellum closely mounted on to playing cards.

Vellum or primed calf-skin was considered an easy alternative to copper in the seventeenth century.

During the 18th century, watercolour on ivory became the standard medium. The use of ivory was first adopted in around 1700, during the latter part of the British reign of William III.

=== Enamel ===
Portrait miniatures painted on enamel in oil on copper support was a method created in Italy during the 16th century. There is debate as to whether this method was attributed to Italian or Dutch artists. During the 17th, 18th, and 19th centuries, portrait miniature artist used enamel with a copper support in Germany, Portugal, and Spain. Many Dutch and German artists adopted copper as a medium further enhancing the images. Over time, only elite could afford the copper, forcing artists to stretched vellum, ivory, or paper. Dutch and German miniatures were painted in oil, and as a rule these are on copper; and there are portraits in the same medium, and often on the same material, attributed to many of the great Italian artists, notably those of the Bolognese school. English Samuel Cooper is said to have executed a few paintings in oil on copper.

Beginning in the mid-17th century, many watercolours were conducted with vitreous enamel. Jean Petitot (1607–1691) was the greatest worker in this material, and painted his finest portraits in Paris for King Louis XIV. His son succeeded him in the same profession. Other artists in enamel were Christian Friedrich Zincke (died 1767) and Johann Melchior Dinglinger. Many of these artists were either French or Swiss, but most of them visited England and worked there for a while. The greatest English enamel portrait painter was Henry Bone (1755–1839). A great collection of his small enamel reproductions of celebrated paintings is in the British Royal Collection. Enamel stayed a consistent and robust alternative to portrait art miniatures during the 18th and 19th centuries.

=== Mica ===
Mica is a very thin mineral that can be shaved to transparent pieces also known at the time as 'talc'. The paper thin material could be painted on with oil and placed over the portrait miniature so that the holder of the portrait miniature could dress up the subject or disguise the portrait.

=== Costume overlays ===
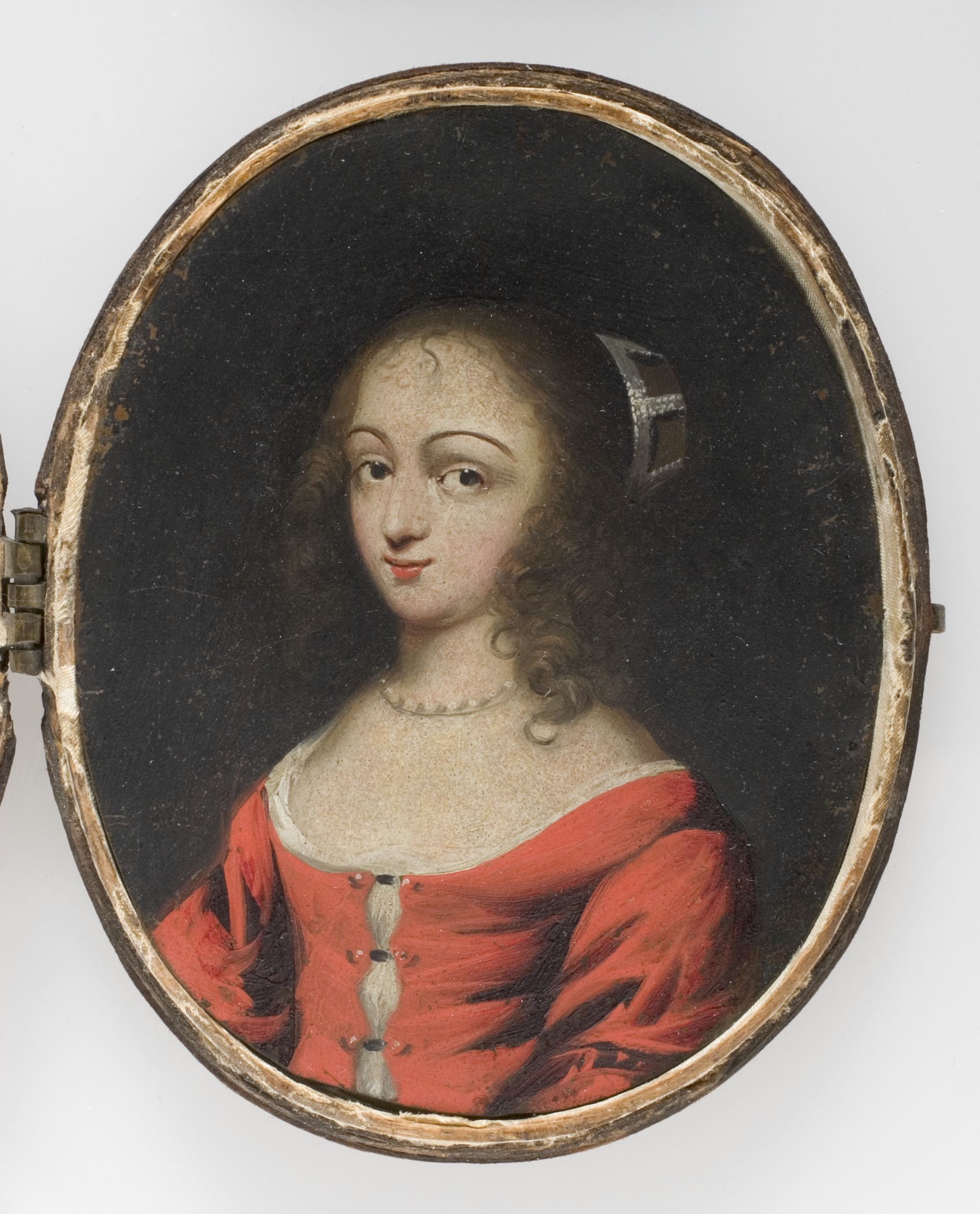
Example of a portrait with several costume overlays at the Los Angeles County Museum of Art. Available online via the Los Angeles County Museum of Art

Costume overlays were a technique in which artists were commissioned to paint a subject in costume or altered state of dress to hide the identity. Typically the portrait was commissioned with a thin removable overlay made from mica to conceal the identity of the subject. Concealing the identity of a miniature would have been necessary if the subject was an unpopular ruler, potentially causing harm if a person was caught carrying the picture. One such example is painting over a portrait in costume to hide the original portrait. The Department of Costumes and Textiles at the Los Angeles County Museum of Art discovered a series for portrait miniatures from England dating from the 1650s that appear to show the same woman in dress. The woman bore a striking resemblance to English monarch Charles I (1600–1649), who was executed in 1649. The king remained popular with a group of followers after his execution and many found subtle ways to honour the king. This discovery is only a glimpse as to how portrait miniatures could also serve as a way to commemorate loss as well as loyalty.

== Displays ==
A number of museums display miniature original oil paintings including the Museum of Arts in Boston and the Astolat Dollhouse Castle when it is on public display. The National Portrait Gallery in Washington, D.C. as well as the Victoria and Albert Museum in London carry a vast number of portrait miniatures among their larger portrait collections, many are also accessible to the public for online viewing.

=== Exhibitions ===
- International Biennial of Miniature Art (since 1989), Gornji Milanovac, Serbia
- International Biennial of Miniature Art (since 2000), Częstochowa, Poland
- Annual Royal Miniature Society Exhibition, London, UK

== Sources ==
- Coombs, Katherine (1998). The Portrait Miniature in England. London: Victoria and Albert Museum. ISBN 1-85177-207-3.
- Foskett, Daphne (1987). Miniatures: Dictionary and Guide. London: Antique Collectors' Club. ISBN 1-85149-063-9.
- Lounsbery, Elizabeth (15 January 1917). American Miniature Painters. The Mentor.
- Reynolds, Graham (1999). The Sixteenth and Seventeenth-Century Miniatures in the Collection of Her Majesty the Queen. London: The Royal Collection. ISBN 978-1-90216-345-1.
- Walker, Richard (1992). The Eighteenth and Early Nineteenth Century Miniatures in the Collection of Her Majesty the Queen. Cambridge: Cambridge University Press. ISBN 978-0-52130-781-9.
