= Portrait painting in Scotland =

Forms of painted portraiture in Scotland

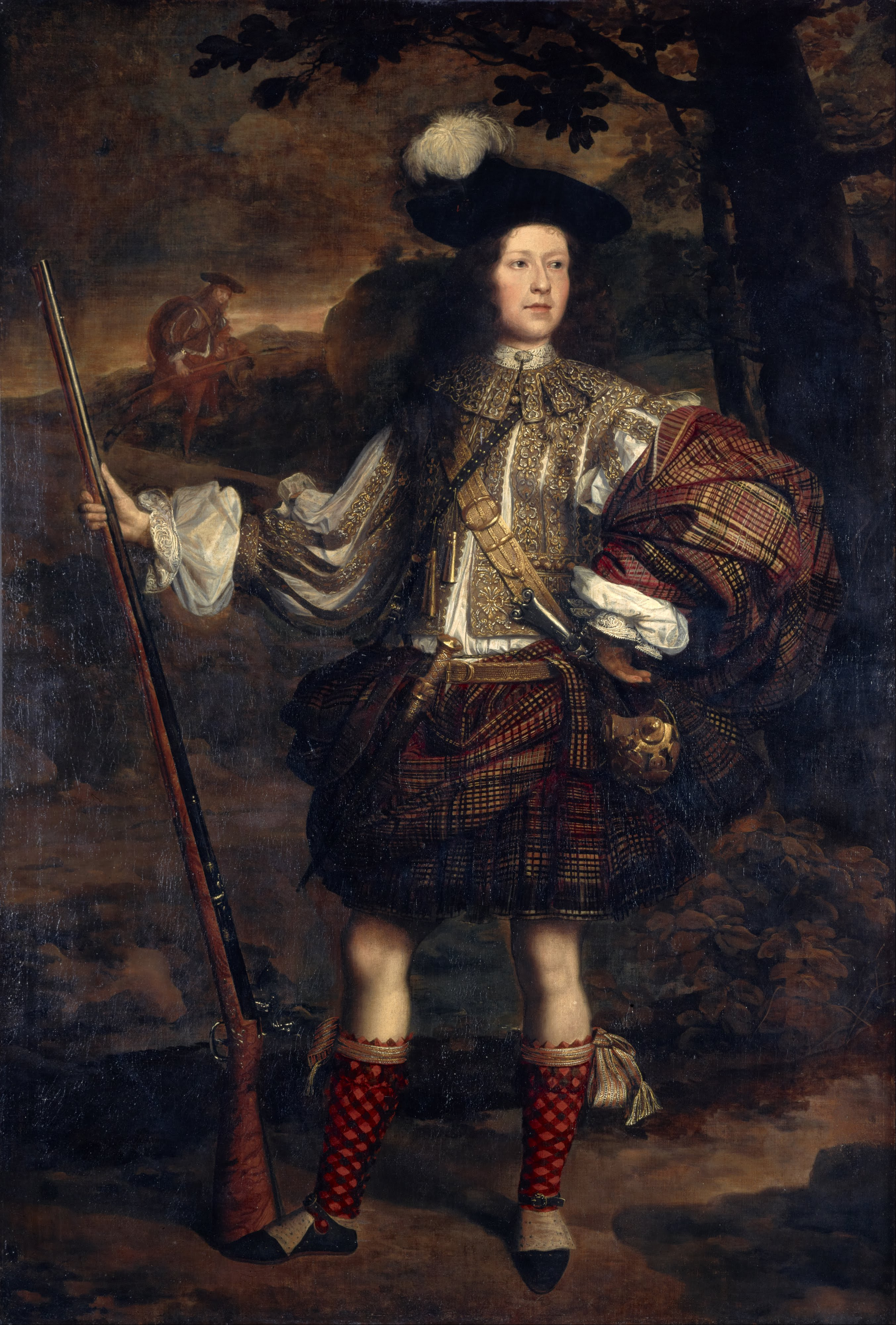
Lord Mungo Murray, by John Michael Wright, an early example of the full-length portrait in Highland dress (c. 1680)

Portrait painting in Scotland includes all forms of painted portraiture in Scotland, from its beginnings in the early sixteenth century until the present day. The origins of the tradition of portrait painting in Scotland are in the Renaissance, particularly through contacts with the Netherlands. The first portrait of a named person that survives is that of Archbishop William Elphinstone, probably painted by a Scottish artist using Flemish techniques around 1505. Around the same period Scottish monarchs turned to the recording of royal likenesses in panel portraits, painted in oils on wood. The tradition of royal portrait painting in Scotland was probably disrupted by the minorities and regencies it underwent for much of the sixteenth century. It began to flourish after the Reformation, with paintings of royal figures and nobles by Netherlands artists Hans Eworth, Arnold Bronckorst and Adrian Vanson. A specific type of Scottish picture from this era was the "vendetta portrait", designed to keep alive the memory of an atrocity. The Union of Crowns in 1603 removed a major source of artistic patronage in Scotland as James VI and his court moved to London. The result has been seen as a shift "from crown to castle", as the nobility and local lairds became the major sources of patronage.

The first significant Scottish portrait artist was George Jameson, who became one of the most successful painters of the reign of Charles I. He trained the Baroque artist John Michael Wright. In this period the full-length portrait in Highland dress became a common form of painting. William Aikman emerged as the leading Scottish portrait-painter of the next generation. He, like most Scottish painters of note before the late eighteenth century, migrated to London. John Alexander and William Mossman painted many of the figures of early-Enlightenment Edinburgh. Allan Ramsay established himself as a leading portrait painter to the Scottish nobility and he undertook portraits of many of the major figures of the Scottish Enlightenment. He later focused on royal portraits, anticipating the Grand Manner of Joshua Reynolds, but many of his early portraits, particularly of women, are less formal and more intimate. The leading portrait painter of the second half of the century was Henry Raeburn, the first significant artist to pursue his entire career in Scotland, his subjects went beyond the nobility to the middle classes. His pupils included the brothers William (Alexander), Archibald and Andrew Robertson. The former two brothers founded the Columbian Academy of Painting in New York, and Andrew was the leading Scottish miniaturist of his day.

The generation of painters that followed Raeburn included David Watson, John Watson Gordon and David Wilkie, who became one of the most influential British artists of the century. From the mid-nineteenth century, portrait painting, particularity the miniature, declined as an art, photography also began to influence painting. Major figures who worked in portraiture and came to prominence in the second half of the century included Francis Grant, Robert Scott Lauder, William Quiller Orchardson and John Pettie. In the twentieth century the move away from figurative painting to Impressionism and abstraction, speeded the decline of portrait painting. Artists who continued to pursue portraiture included Francis Cadell, Cecile Walton, Dorothy Johnstone and James Cowie. The second half of the twentieth century saw a general movement back towards figurative representation. Alexander Moffat was among the leading Scottish intellectuals from the 1960s. The artists associated with Moffat known as the "new Glasgow Boys" included Steven Campbell, Peter Howson, Ken Currie and Adrian Wisniewski. A parallel movement in Edinburgh, focused around the 369 Gallery in the city, included Caroline McNairn, Robert MacLaurin and Gwen Hardie.

== Sixteenth century ==
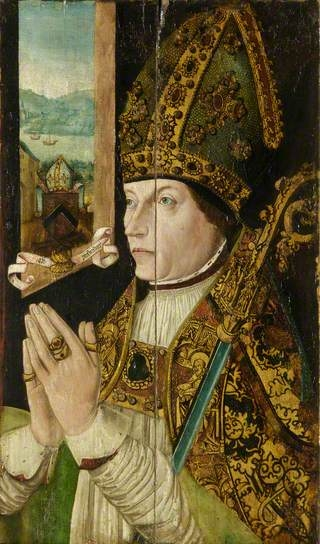
Oil on wood portrait of Bishop William Elphinstone of St Andrews (1431–1514), probably the earliest accurate likeness of a named Scottish person (c. 1505)

The origins of the tradition of portrait painting in Scotland are in the Renaissance, which began to reach Scotland in the fifteenth century. Portraits were given an important role in Renaissance society, valued as objects, and as depictions of earthly success and status. In Scotland this was particularly through contacts with the Netherlands, generally considered the centre of painting in the Northern Renaissance. The products of these connections included a fine portrait of William Elphinstone (1431–1514), Lord Chancellor, Bishop of Aberdeen and founder of the university there. Painted around 1505, it is one of the earliest representations of a named Scottish subject to survive and was probably painted by a Scots artist using Flemish techniques of oil on wood. Around the same time, Scottish monarchs, like those in England, turned to the recording of royal likenesses in panel portraits, painted in oils on wood, perhaps as a form of political expression. As in England, the monarchy may have had model portraits of royalty used for copies and reproductions, but the versions of native royal portraits that survive are generally crude by continental standards.

In 1502, James IV paid for delivery of portraits of the Tudor household, perhaps by the "Inglishe payntour" named "Mynours," who stayed in Scotland to paint the king and his new bride Margaret Tudor the following year. "Mynours" was Maynard Wewyck, a Flemish painter who usually worked for Henry VII in London. A portrait of James IV at Abbotsford House bearing the date "1502" has been attributed to Wewyck.

Another Flemish painter, called "Piers", tentatively identified as Peeken Bovelant, an apprentice of an Antwerp painter Goswijn van der Weyden, was brought to Scotland by Andrew Halyburton, the trading agent in Middelburg, in September 1505. No details are known of his work, except his assistance in painting costumes and heraldry for tournaments, but the king gave him a salary and accommodation, and it is likely that Piers made portraits for the court. Piers returned to Flanders from Inverkeithing in July 1508. Some references in the royal accounts call him a "Frenchman".

The tradition of royal portrait painting in Scotland was probably disrupted by the minorities and regencies it underwent for much of the sixteenth century. In his majority James V was probably more concerned with architectural expressions of royal identity. Mary Queen of Scots had been brought up in the French court, where she was drawn and painted by major European artists, but she did not commission any adult portraits, with the exception of the joint portrait with her second husband Henry Stuart, Lord Darnley. This may have reflected an historic Scottish pattern, where heraldic display, or an elaborate tomb were considered more important than a portrait.

Portraiture began to flourish after the Reformation in the mid-sixteenth century. There were anonymously painted portraits of important individuals, including one of James Hepburn, 4th Earl of Bothwell (1556). Artists from the Low Countries remained important. Hans Eworth, who had been court painter to Mary I of England, painted a number of Scottish subjects in the 1560s. His 1561 wedding portraits were miniatures commemorating the brief marriage of the Earl of Bothwell and Jean Gordon. He also painted James Stewart, 1st Earl of Moray in 1561 and two years later he painted a joint portrait of the young Darnley and his brother Charles Stuart. Lord Seton, Master of the Royal Household, commissioned two portraits in the Netherlands in the 1570s, one of himself and one a family portrait. A specific type of Scottish picture from this era was the "vendetta portrait", designed to keep alive the memory of an atrocity. Examples include the Darnley memorial portrait, which shows the young James VI kneeling at his murdered father's tomb, and the life-size portrait of the corpse of The Bonnie Earl of Moray, vividly showing the wounds received by James Stewart, 2nd Earl of Moray when he was killed by George Gordon, 1st Marquess of Huntly in 1591.

There was an attempt to produce a series of portraits of Scottish kings in panel portraits, probably for the royal entry of the fifteen-year-old James VI in 1579, which are Medieval in form. In James VI's personal reign, Renaissance forms of portraiture began to dominate. He employed two Flemish artists, Arnold Bronckorst in the early 1580s and Adrian Vanson from around 1584 to 1602, who have left a visual record of the king and major figures at the court. Although few portraits from this period exist, the case of Archibald Cornwall, executed for displaying royal portraits on the gallows, suggests that many householders in Edinburgh owned copies of royal portraits. However, the Union of Crowns in 1603 removed a major source of artistic patronage in Scotland as James VI and his court moved to London. The result has been seen as a shift "from crown to castle", as the nobility and local lairds became the major sources of patronage.

== Seventeenth century ==
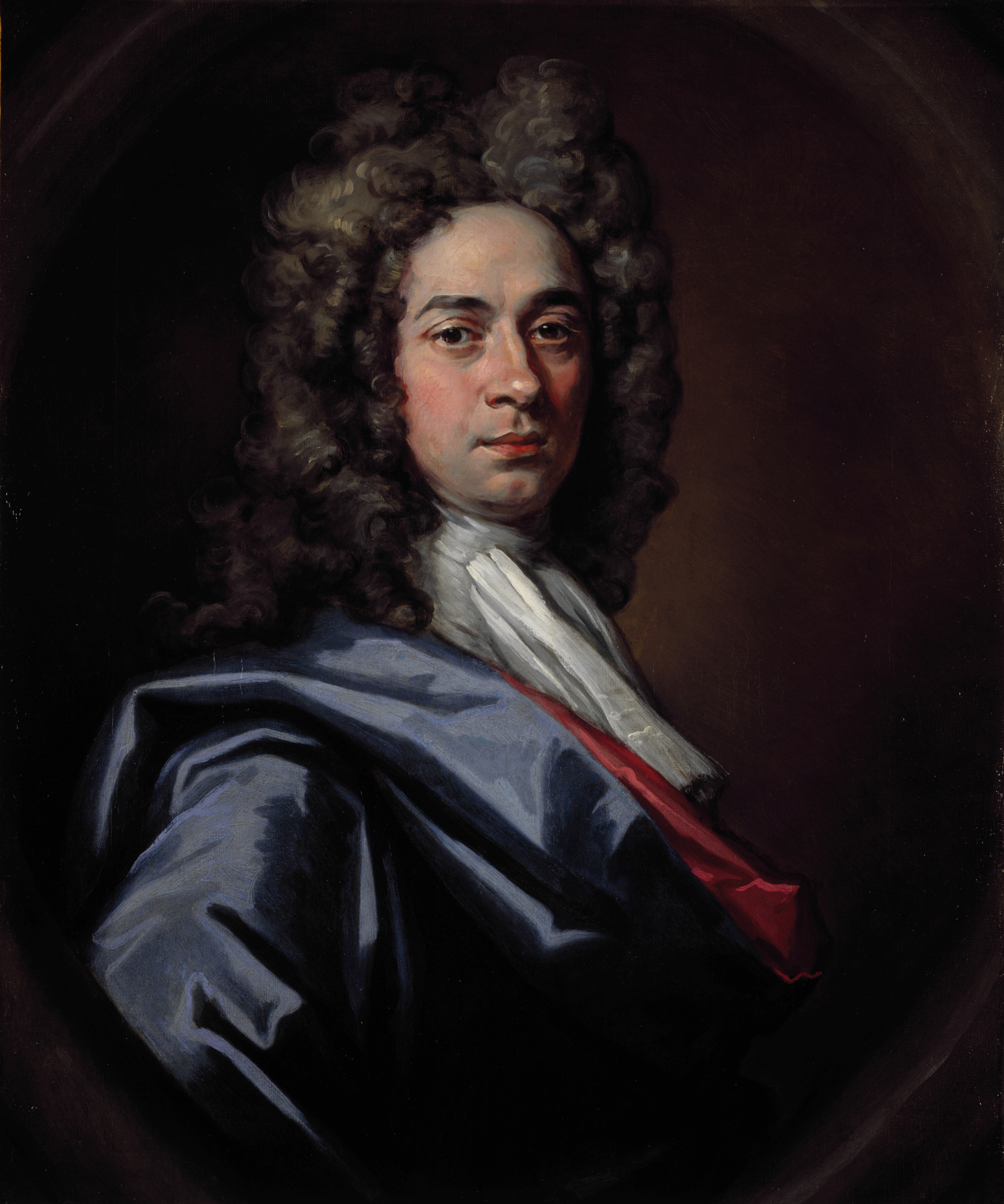
Self portrait by John Baptist Medina (c. 1698)

By the seventeenth century the fashion for portraiture had spread down the social order to lairds such as Colin Campbell of Glenorchy and John Napier of Merchiston. Adam de Colone, perhaps the son of Adrian Vanson and probably trained in the Netherlands, was working in England in the 1620s. In 1623 he painted his portrait of George Seaton, 3rd Earl of Winton and his sons and another of Seaton's wife Anne Hay with her two daughters.

The first significant native artist was George Jamesone of Aberdeen (1589/90–1644), who, having trained in the Netherlands, became one of the most successful portrait painters of the reign of Charles I. He trained the Baroque artist John Michael Wright (1617–94), who also studied in Rome with Poussin and Velázquez. Wright painted both Scottish and English subjects, including his sensitive portrait of the architect William Bruce (1664) and styled himself as "king's painter". His full-length painting of Lord Mungo Murray in Highland dress (c. 1680) is an early example of what became a standard format of Scottish portrait. The Commonwealth period saw the emergence of David Scougall (c.1610–1680), mainly noted for his portrait of the Covenanter leader Archibald Campbell. Also important was the miniaturist David Paton (fl. 1668–1708), who worked mainly in plumbago, but also painted portraits in oil. Visiting artists included Jacob de Wett (c. 1610–c. 1691), who was commissioned in 1684 to paint images of 110 kings for Holyroodhouse and similar work at Glamis Castle.

After the Glorious Revolution, Wright, a Jacobite, fell out of favour at the royal court. The Flemish-Spanish painter John Baptist Medina (1659–1710) came to Scotland in 1693 and became the leading Scottish portrait painter of his generation. Among his best known works are a group of about 30 oval bust-lengths, including a self-portrait, in Surgeons' Hall, Edinburgh. He trained his son, also John, and William Aikman (1682–1731), who became the leading Scottish portrait-painter of the next generation. Aikman migrated to London in 1723, and from this point until the late eighteenth century, most Scottish painters of note followed him.

== Eighteenth century ==
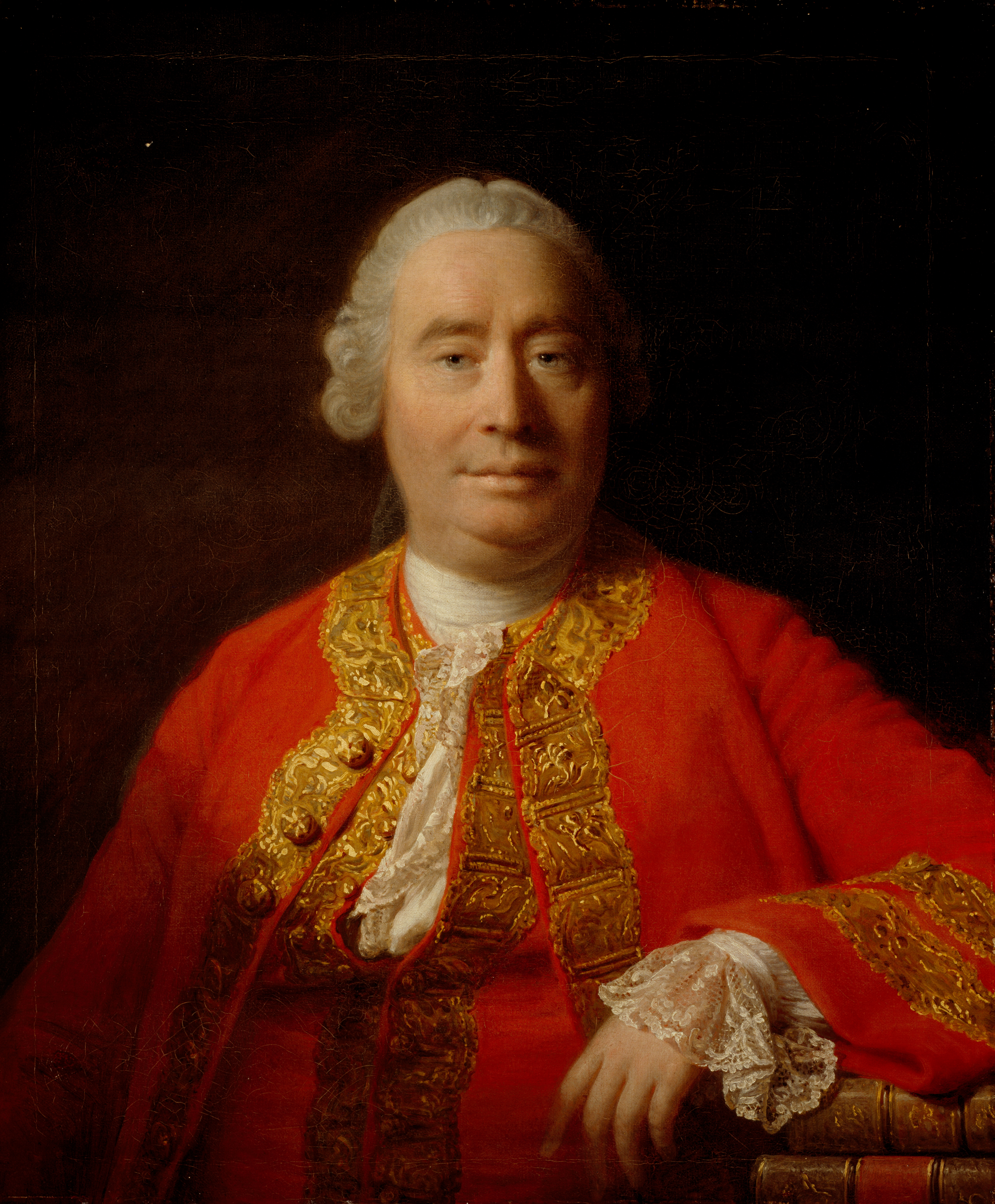
Portrait of David Hume. The key Enlightenment figure David Hume, painted by his friend Allan Ramsay (1766)

John Alexander was born in Aberdeen and was a great grandson of portrait painter George Jamesone. He studied in London and Rome, returning to Scotland about 1720. His younger contemporary William Mossman (1700–1771) was also from Aberdeen and studied in Rome. Both worked predominately in the north-east around their home city, but also painted many of the figures of early-Enlightenment Edinburgh. Alexander's best known work included the portrait of George Drummond the Lord Provost of Edinburgh (1756), who had been responsible for the creation of the New Town in Edinburgh and the Royal Infirmary, which is shown in the background of the painting. Mosman's work included his portrait of John Campbell of the Bank (1749), who was chief cashier of the Royal Bank of Scotland and a Whig, but who is depicted in the recently forbidden Highland dress. Because of his Jacobite sympathies Alexander was forced to leave for the continent after the rebellion of 1745, and in Rome he made a living painting the Jacobite expatriates who congregated there, before his return a few years later.

Allan Ramsay (1713–84) studied in Sweden, London and Italy before basing himself in Edinburgh, where he established himself as a leading portrait painter to the Scottish nobility. He undertook portraits of many of the major figures of the Scottish Enlightenment, including his friend the philosopher David Hume and the visiting Jean-Jacques Rousseau. After a second visit to Italy he moved to London in 1757 and from 1761 he was Principal Painter in Ordinary to George III. He now focused on royal portraits, often presented by the king to ambassadors and colonial governors, but also more intimate works like that of Queen Charlotte and her Children (c. 1755). His work has been seen as anticipating the Grand Manner of Joshua Reynolds, but many of his early portraits, particularly of women, are less formal and more intimate studies.

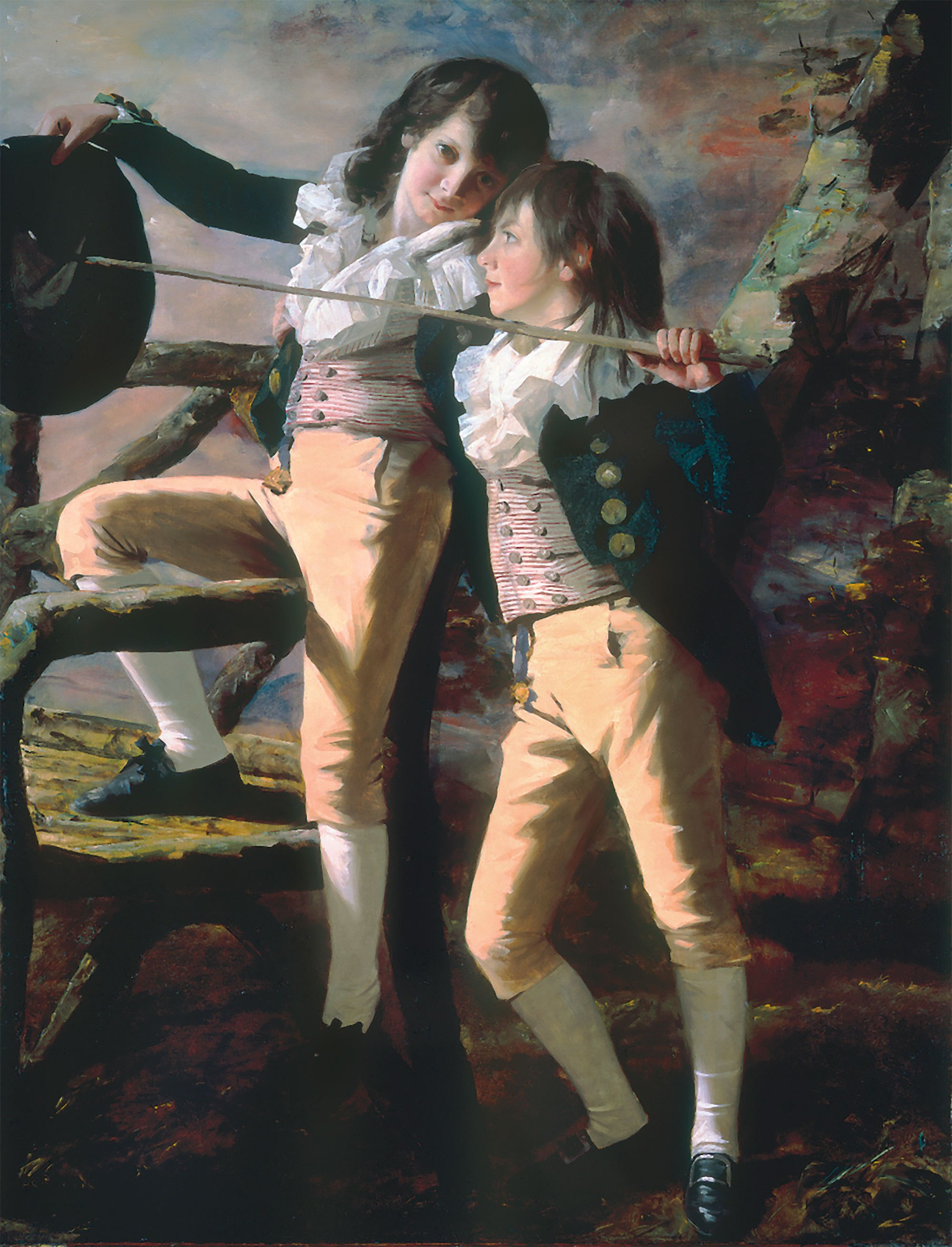
Portrait of James and John Lee Allen by Henry Raeburn, early 1790s

The leading portrait painter of the second half of the century was Henry Raeburn (1756–1823). He was the first significant artist to pursue his entire career in Scotland. Born in Edinburgh and returning there after a trip to Italy in 1786, he is most famous for his intimate portraits of leading figures in Scottish life, going beyond the aristocracy to lawyers, doctors, professors, writers and ministers, adding elements of Romanticism to the Grand Manner tradition. He became a knight in 1822 and the King's painter and limner in 1823, marking a return to the post being associated with the production of art. His pupils included the brothers William (Alexander) (1772–1841), Archibald (1765–1835) and Andrew Robertson (1777–1845). William and Archibald went on to found the Columbian Academy of Painting in New York, and Andrew to be the leading Scottish miniaturist of his day. Also associated with Raeburn towards the end of his career were John Syme (1795–1861) and Colvin Smith (1795–1875).

== Nineteenth century ==
Of the generation of painters that followed Raeburn, David Watson (1767–1837) trained with Reynolds in London before returning home to become the first president of the Scottish Academy in 1826. The influence of both Reynolds and Raeburn can be seen in his work, including A Girl Drawing (1813) and the large group portrait The Children of the Earl of Elgin with their Nurse (c. 1805). He was followed as president of the academy by his nephew John Watson Gordon (1788–1864), who also studied with Raeburn. He painted portraits of leading cultural figures James Hogg and Lady Nairne as part of a series of portraits commissioned by William Blackwood. David Wilkie (1785–1841) worked mainly in London, and produced the flattering painting of the King George IV in Highland dress commemorating the royal visit to Scotland in 1823 that set off the international fashion for the kilt. He succeeding Raeburn as Royal Limner in 1823 and would emerge of one of the most influential British artists of the century. Andrew Geddes (1783–1844) produced some landscapes, but also portraits of Scottish subjects, including Walter Scott, before he finally moved to London in 1831. John Graham-Gilbert (1794–1866) was born in Glasgow and worked in the city from 1834, playing an important part in the professionalisation of painting there. Other figures to pursue their careers largely in portraiture based in Glasgow included Daniel Macnee (1806–82), who only moved to Edinburgh after his election of President of the Academy in 1876.

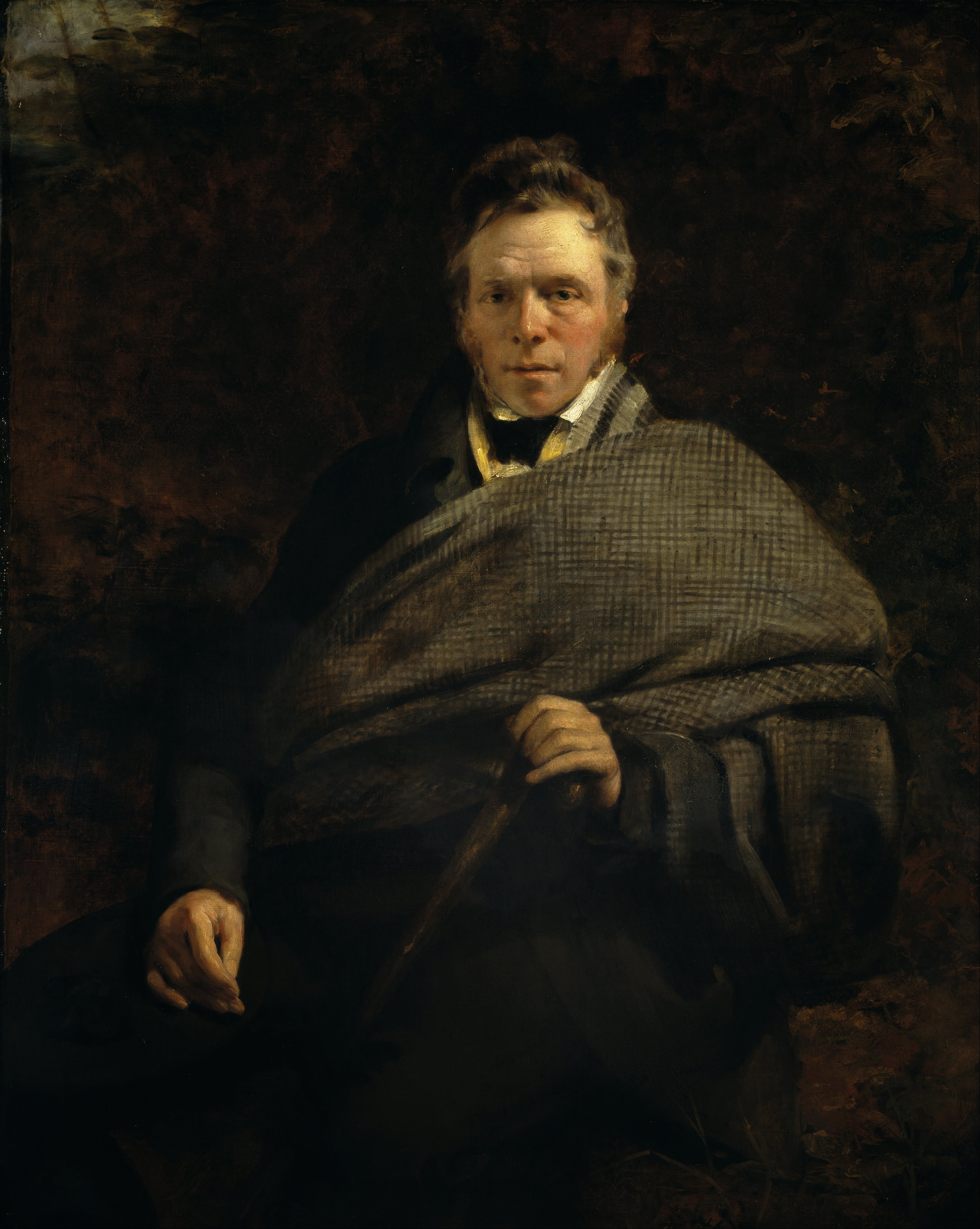
James Hogg, by John Watson Gordon (1830)

From the mid-nineteenth century portrait painting declined as an art. This was partly due to the advent of photography, which could record the human face with greater ease. While grander commissions were still made, the miniature in particular, which had often been in an intimate locket or brooch, was largely replaced. David Octavius Hill (1802–70) originally took an interest in photography as a means of being able to record the figures of Great Disruption of 1843 for a composite painted portrait, but as part of Hill & Adamson he was one of the founding fathers of art photography. Just as portrait photography inherited many of the conventions of painting, photography also began to influence painting. From the 1840s John Watson Gordon's work began to be influenced by early photography, with cool light and muted colours, as can be seen in his full-length portrait of Principal Lee (1847). Major figures who worked in portraiture and came to prominence in the second half of the century included Francis Grant, who became the first Scottish president of the Royal Academy in London, Robert Scott Lauder (1803–69), William Quiller Orchardson (1832–1910) and John Pettie (1839–93). John Zephaniah Bell (1794–1883) was educated in London and was a forerunner of the trend of Parisian education that would become common among Scottish artists from the later nineteenth century. The most significant grouping in late nineteenth-century Scotland, the Glasgow Boys, mainly focused on landscape. They were influenced by the leading continental artists of the day and broke with Victorian convention. A number of artists identified with the group came to support themselves through portrait painting, including James Guthrie (1859–1930) and Belfast-born John Lavery (1856–1944).

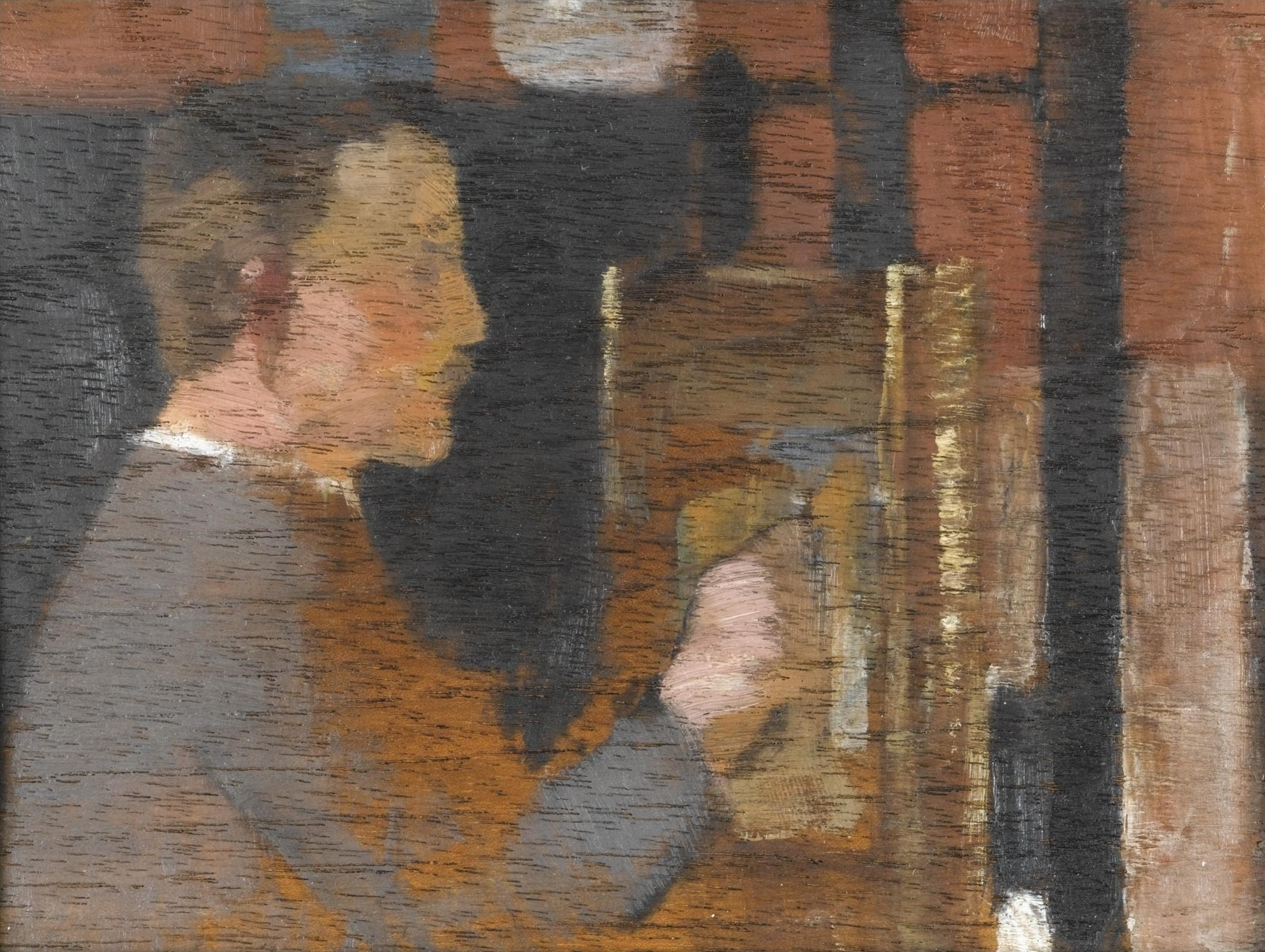
James Guthrie At His Easel by Joseph Crawhall, 1885.

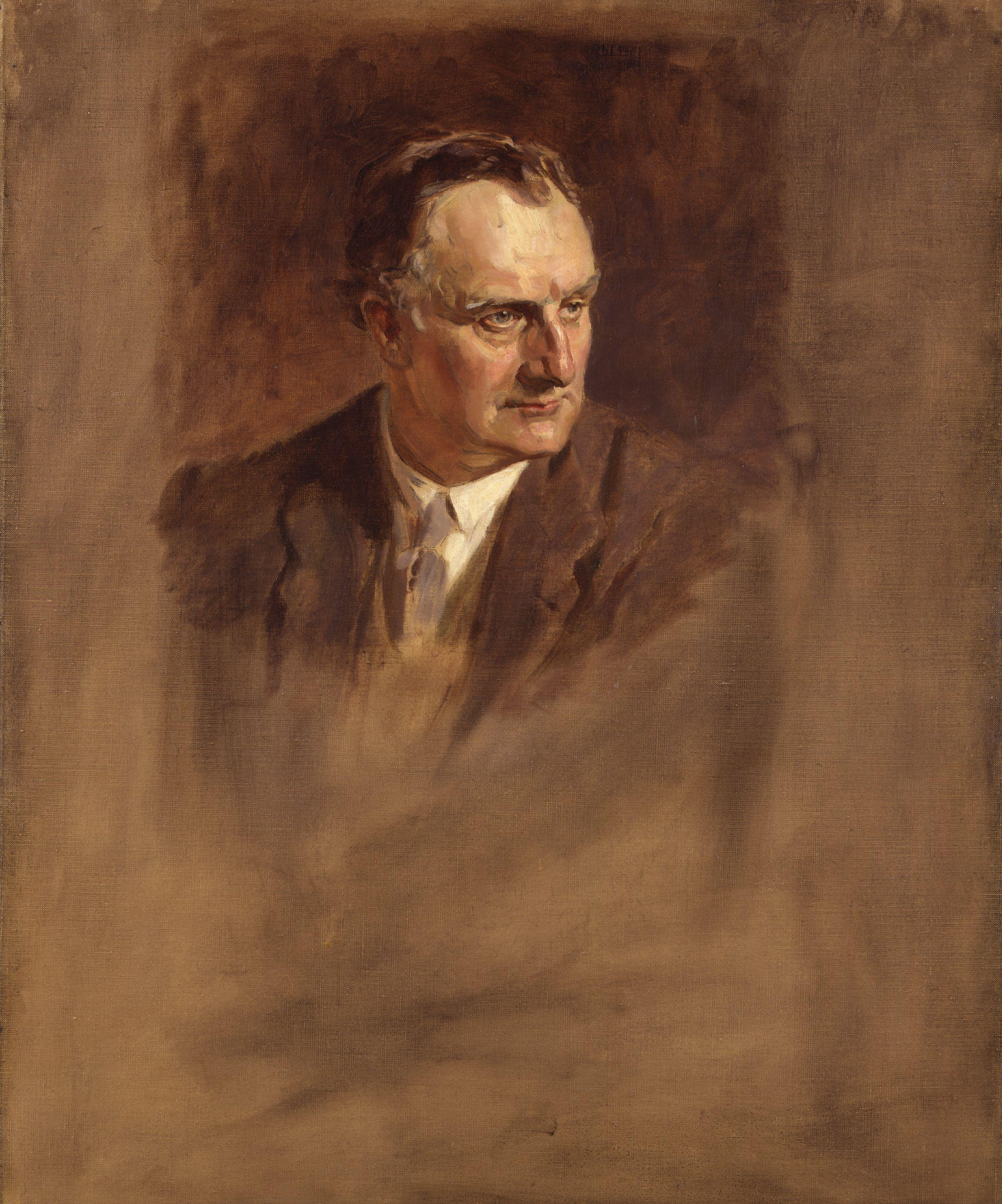
Edward Grey, 1st Viscount Grey of Fallodon by James Guthrie, c. 1924 – c. 1930

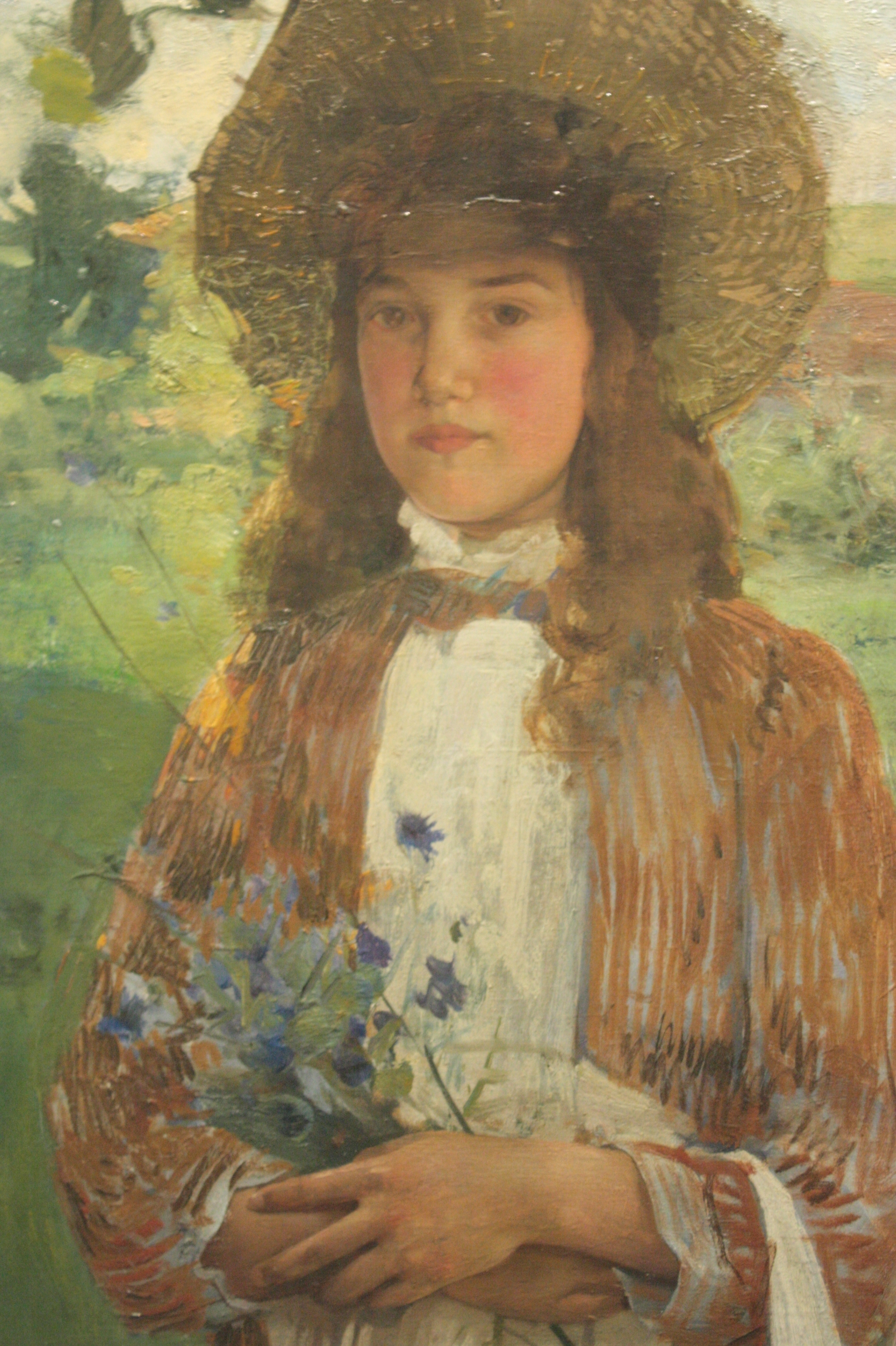
Bluette by Edward Arthur Walton, 1891

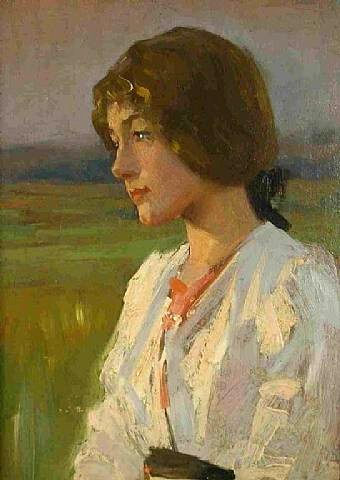
Portrait of a Girl at Dusk by Alexander Mann (date unknown; d. 1908)

== Twentieth century to the present ==
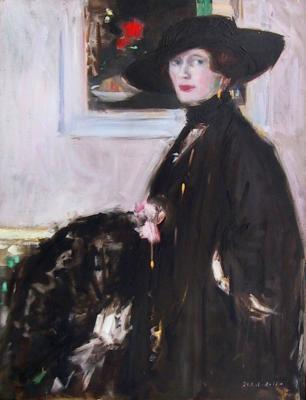
Francis Cadell's Black Hat, Miss Don Wauchope (1929)

In the twentieth century, the move away from figurative painting to Impressionism and abstraction continued the decline of portrait painting. The first significant group of Scottish artists to emerge in the twentieth century were the four members of the Scottish Colourists in the 1920s. They have been described as the first Scottish modern artists and were the major mechanism by which Post-Impressionism reached Scotland. Of their number Francis Cadell (1883–1937), emerged as a significant painter of still lives and single figure compositions, particularly with interior backdrops, before moving closer to abstraction. Of the next significant movement, known as The Edinburgh School, Cecile Walton (1891–1956) referenced classical forms, particularly in her ironic self-portrait Romance (1920), which draws on Titian's Venus of Urbino and Manet's Olympia. Her close friend Dorothy Johnstone's portraits, such as the young girl in September Sunlight (1916), made use of interior natural light. The work of James Cowie (1886–1956), who painted a number of girls in interior settings, is similar in theme to that of Johnstone, but had a more distant and elegiac feel that can be seen in Falling Leaves (1934), which has been read as a commentary as a commentary on the transition from childhood to adolescence.

The second half of the twentieth century saw a general movement back towards figurative representation in European art. Alexander Moffat (b. 1943), who concentrated on portraiture, labelled with the description of "Scottish realism", was among the leading Scottish intellectuals from the 1960s. His work included the allegorical Poet's Pub (1980), which shows leading figures in Scottish twentieth-century intellectual life grouped around the poet Hugh MacDiarmid. The artists associated with Moffat and the Glasgow School of Art who came to prominence in the 1980s are sometimes known as the "new Glasgow Boys", or "Glasgow pups" and included Steven Campbell (1953–2007), Peter Howson (b. 1958), Ken Currie (b. 1960) and Adrian Wisniewski (b. 1958). Strongly influenced by New Image painting that came to prominence in the early 1980s, they have combined figurative art with social commentary. A parallel movement in Edinburgh, focused around the 369 Gallery in the city, included Caroline McNairn (1955–2010), Robert MacLaurin (b. 1965) and Gwen Hardie (b. 1962).
