= Alexander Moffat =

Scottish artist (born 1943)

- Born: 1943 (age 82–83); Dunfermline, Scotland
- Education: Edinburgh Art College
- Occupations: painter, author and teacher
- Employer(s): Glasgow School of Art Honorary President, The Essential School of Painting

Alexander Moffat OBE RSA (born 1943) known as Sandy Moffat, is a Scottish painter, author and teacher.

== Biography ==
Moffat was born in Dunfermline in 1943. He studied at Edinburgh Art College, where he was taught by William Gillies, Robin Philipson and James Cumming. He concentrated on portraiture, described as "Scottish realism", and was among the leading Scottish intellectuals of the 1960s. He was Head of Painting and Printmaking at the Glasgow School of Art, where he worked for 25 years until 2005 and is credited with helping to steer the resurgence of figurative painting at the School. Painters like the so called New Glasgow Boys of the late 1980s including Steven Campbell, Peter Howson, Adrian Wiszniewski and Ken Currie, in addition to Jenny Saville and Alison Watt, were among his students.

In 2018 Moffat received an Honorary Doctorate from Glasgow School of Art in recognition of the contribution that he, along with Sam Ainsley and David Harding, had made in nurturing and developing artists which enhanced Glasgow's reputation as a centre of creative practise.

Since 2010 Moffat has been the Honorary President of The Essential School of Painting in London, an independent artist-led art school dedicated to teaching painting at a high level co-founded by one of his former students and lecturers at GSA, Alison Harper and Andrew Wamae.

== Collections ==
Examples of Moffat's work are held in the collections of the National Galleries of Scotland, the Russell-Cotes art gallery, the University of Edinburgh, Fife Council, the University of St Andrews, the Museum of the Isles, the Orkney Islands Council, the North Ayrshire Council, and the Royal Scottish Academy of Art and Architecture.

== Exhibitions ==
- Scottish National Portrait Gallery
- The Press Club, Warsaw
- The Open Eye Gallery, Edinburgh
- The Peacocks Visual Arts Gallery, Aberdeen

== Books ==
- Arts of Independence (with Alan Riach), Luath Press, 2014
- Arts of Resistance (with Alan Riach), Luath Press, 2009

== See also ==
- Portrait painting in Scotland
