= Doctor of Civil Law =

University conferred law degree or awarded honorary doctorate

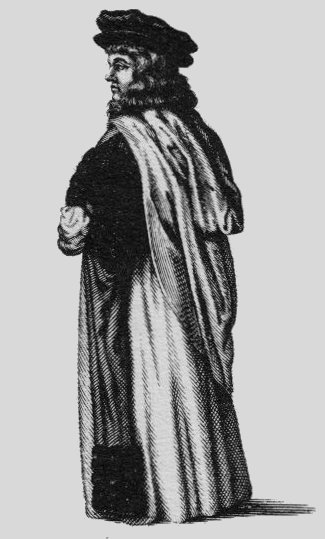
An Oxford Doctor of Civil Law, in Convocation dress, from David Loggan's 1675 engraving Oxonia Illustrata.

Doctor of Civil Law (DCL; Latin: Legis Civilis Doctor or Juris Civilis Doctor) is a degree offered by some universities, such as the University of Oxford, instead of the more common Doctor of Laws (LLD) degrees.

At Oxford, the degree is a higher doctorate usually awarded on the basis of exceptionally insightful and distinctive publications that contain significant and original contributions to the study of law or politics in general. The DCL is senior to all degrees save the Doctor of Divinity which was traditionally the highest degree bestowed by the Universities. The degree of Doctor of Canon Law was replaced by the DCL after the Reformation. The degree of Doctor of Civil Law by Diploma is customarily conferred on foreign Heads of State, as well as on the Chancellor of the university.

The British sovereign cannot receive university degrees, since they would theoretically place them under the jurisdiction of the Chancellor of the university. However, prior to her accession as queen of the UK, Princess Elizabeth accepted several honorary degrees, including a DCL from Oxford in 1948.

In Canada, McGill University offers a Doctor of Civil Law as its research doctorate in law.

In many universities, the DCL is an honorary degree. Examples:

- Mount Allison University, Canada
- University of Durham, United Kingdom
- University of Newcastle upon Tyne, United Kingdom

== See also ==
- Doctor of Laws
- Lambeth degree
- Michael Faraday
