= Jealott's Hill =

Village in Berkshire, England

Coordinates: 51.453°N 0.751°W

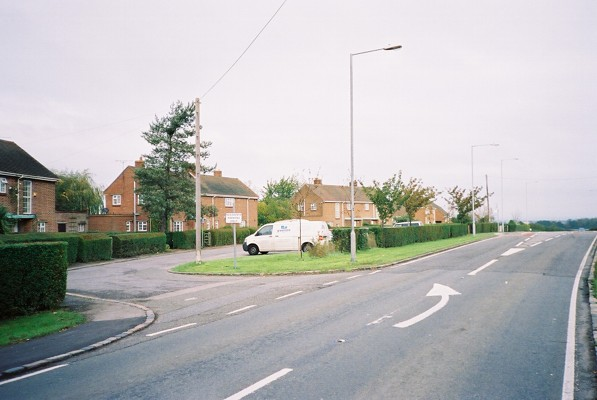
- Jealott's Hill

- Location within Berkshire
- OS grid reference: SU871735
- Metropolitan borough: Bracknell Forest
- Metropolitan county: Berkshire
- Region: South East
- Country: England
- Sovereign state: United Kingdom
- Post town: Bracknell
- Postcode district: RG42
- Dialling code: 01344
- Police: Thames Valley
- Fire: Royal Berkshire
- Ambulance: South Central
- UK Parliament: Maidenhead

Jealott's Hill is a village in the county of Berkshire, England, within the civil parish of Warfield. The settlement is on the A3095 road approximately 3 miles (5 km) north of Bracknell. The nearest railway station is in Bracknell.

== History ==
The name of the hill is reported to have derived from the surname of a 14th-century landowner, Roger Jolyl. This name evolved into "Joyliff's Hill" and then, on Henry Walter's Map of Windsor Forest, 1823, became "Jealous Hill". This changed again to "Jealot's Hill" on John Snare's 1846 map and by the 1920s the modern spelling was established.

== Syngenta research site ==
Jealott's Hill is home to Syngenta's largest research and development site which includes a large agricultural research greenhouse at 4,000 square metres (43,000 sq ft) and a 260 ha (640-acre) farm. As of 2018, Syngenta employed around 800 people there. The site was formed in 1927 by the amalgamation of three farms, Hawthorndale, Nuptown and Jealott's Hill itself. Jealott's Hill House was built in 1928 and officially opened on 28 June 1929 as the offices, laboratory and library of Imperial Chemical Industries's Agricultural Research Station; initially the research focused on nitrogen fertilizers in grassland management.

In 1936, the Hawthorndale Biological Laboratories were opened in the converted mansion building of the former farm. Research there involved the biological evaluation of chemicals as potential pesticides. The site is now called Jealott's Hill International Research Centre. In 2007, the site was recognised by the Royal Society of Chemistry as a National Chemistry Landmark and awarded a blue plaque in recognition of 80 years of scientific research which led to global developments in agriculture.

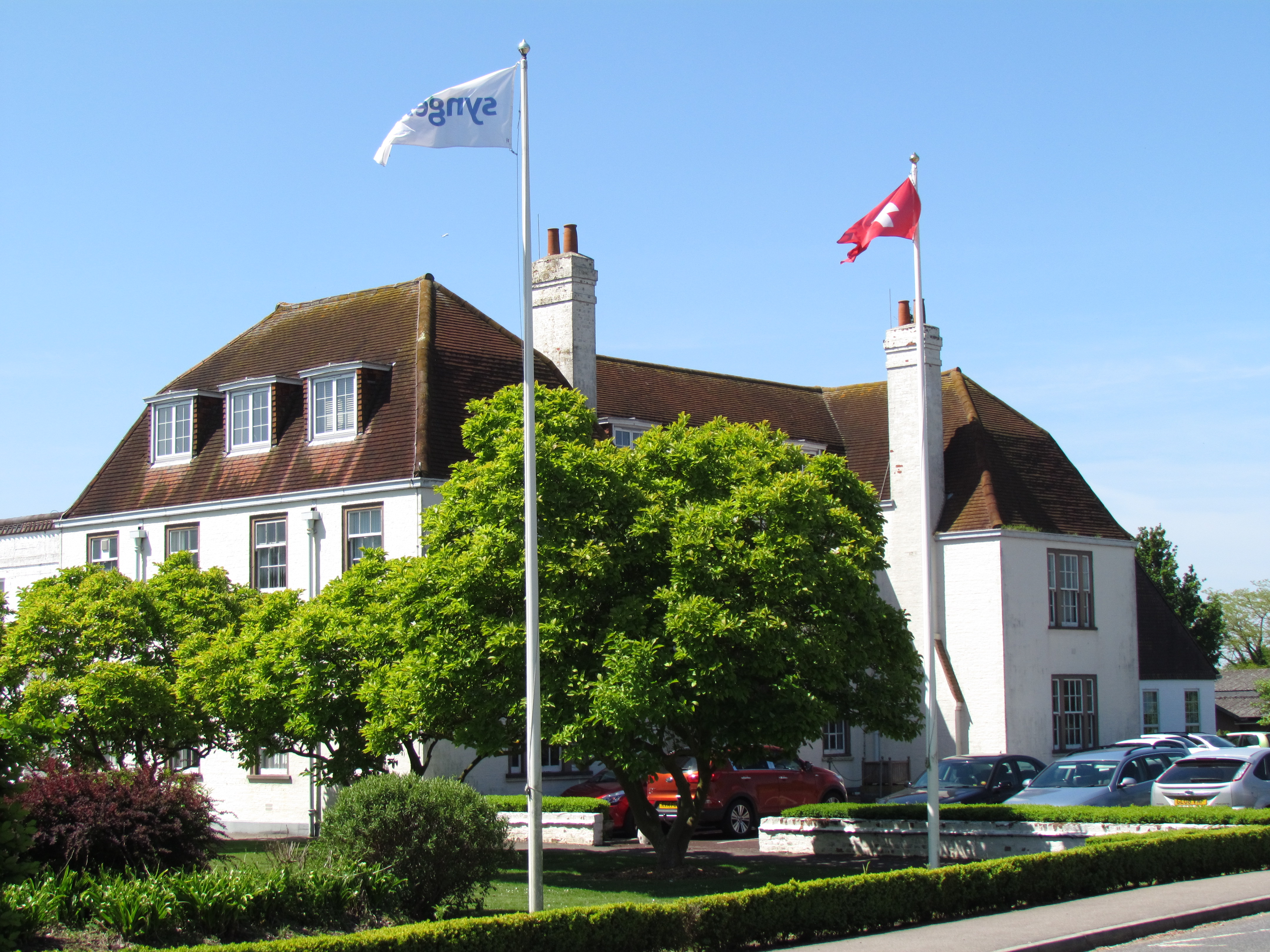
Jealott's Hill House

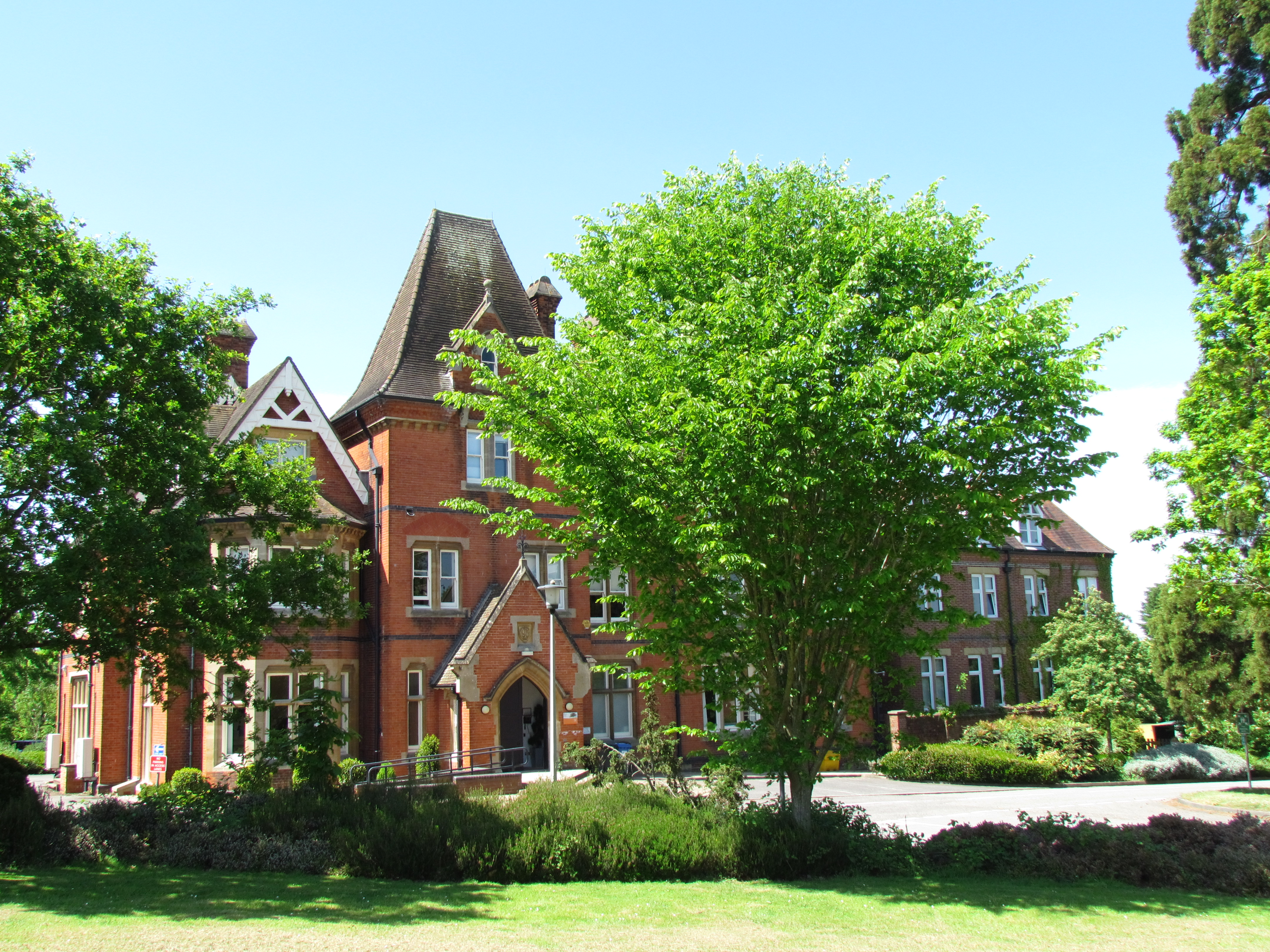
Hawthorndale House
