= Sam Ainsley =

British artist & teacher (born 1950)

- Born: 1950 (age 75–76); North Shields, England,
- Education: Jacob Kramer College; Newcastle Polytechnic; Edinburgh College of Art
- Known for: Painting, Printmaking, Teaching
- Elected: RSA, DLitt (Honorary), Saltire Society Outstanding Women of Scotland
- Website: www.samainsley.com

Sam Ainsley (born Samantha Ainsley, 1950) is a British artist and teacher, living and working in Glasgow, who was the founder and former head of the Master of Fine Art (MFA) programme at the Glasgow School of Art.

== Education ==
Ainsley was born in North Shields, then Northumberland and now in North Tyneside. In 1973 she completed the one-year foundation course at the Jacob Kramer College in Leeds and until 1977 she studied painting at Newcastle Polytechnic. In 1975 she spent six weeks in Japan studying Sukiya architecture which led to her using a very limited palette of colours but with an emphasis on texture and materials. After graduating from Newcastle, Ainsley spent a year in postgraduate study at Edinburgh College of Art. When she completed her post-graduate diploma there in 1978, an Andrew Grant fellowship award allowed to her to teach part-time in the same department for a year.

== Early career ==
Following a visit to New York City in 1979, Ainsley began using unstretched, shaped canvases and her work developed from monochrome canvases into abstract shapes using the full colour spectrum. Her Postgraduate work was heavily influenced by her time in Japan and her interest in Japanese culture. In 1982 Ainsley created a series of banners for the inauguration of the Scottish National Gallery of Modern Art's new building in Edinburgh. A commission for a thirty-foot tapestry woven at the Dovecot Studios, Edinburgh for the headquarters building of the General Accident insurance company in Perth was completed in 1983. Her 1985 Banner for Greenham represented Ainsley's political concerns and featured images of the circle of women protesting at Greenham Common. A solo show of Ainsley's work was held at the Third Eye Centre in Glasgow in 1987, included a semi-autobiographical installation entitled 'Why I Choose Red', and was her first major one person exhibition in Scotland. In 2004 she was also included in the permanent collection of women artists in the New Hall, Cambridge collection.

== Teaching ==
From 1985 Ainsley taught Environmental Art at the Glasgow School of Art before co-founding the School's MFA course in 1989 with fellow GSA lecturer John Calcutt. Ainsley was appointed the MFA programme director in 1991 and held the post until 2005. Since leaving full-time teaching, Ainsley has continued to paint and participated in numerous joint and solo exhibitions.

Ainsley is a respected and published spokeswoman for the visual arts and her own artwork is in a number of public and private collections nationally and internationally. Ainsley has contributed to a broad range of visual art initiatives in Scotland and has served as a board member on many arts organisations. She has exhibited in and curated independent exhibitions and undertaken residencies in numerous institutions and arts organisations across the US, Australasia, Europe and the UK. More recent presentations of her work include the New Scots, RSA Edinburgh, Atlas of Encounters at I Space Gallery, Chicago and Athens, Live your Questions Now and Studio 58, Mackintosh Museum, GSA and After Growth and Form at the Glasgow Print Studio. In 2017 she was invited to have a one-person exhibition at An Tobar on the Isle of Mull. Ainsley was also represented in two recent exhibitions in Edinburgh and Glasgow to mark the 30th anniversary of The Vigorous Imagination, a landmark exhibition held the Scottish National Gallery of Modern Art in 1987. She was also elected to the Royal Scottish Academy and was inducted into the 'Outstanding Women of Scotland' by the Saltire Society in 2017.

Ainsley has worked collaboratively with David Harding and Sandy Moffat as AHM and continues to work independently in her studio. Alongside Harding and Moffat, Ainsley was granted an Honorary Doctorate by the Glasgow School of Art in June 2018, for their "seminal contribution to art practice and education over the last 40 years."

== Exhibitions and public Collections ==
=== Solo exhibitions include ===
Out of Redness Comes Kindness (2023), Vernon Street Gallery, Leeds; Sam Ainsley (2023), WINDOW, Perth; Stories Real and Imagined (2022), Royal Scottish Academy, Edinburgh; Alternating Currents (2019), Islensk Grafik, Reykjavik, Iceland; Sam Ainsley (2017) An Tobar, Tobermory, Mull.

=== Group exhibitions include ===
Scottish Women Artists: 250 Years of Challenging Perception (2023), Dovecot, Edinburgh; Transforming Tradition; Scottish Women Artists (2022), Sainsbury Centre, Norwich; On John Berger (2022), Zembla Gallery, Hawick; New Scots, RSA Edinburgh, Atlas of Encounters at I Space Gallery, Chicago and Athens, Live your questions now and Studio 58 Mackintosh Museum, GSA and After Growth and Form at Glasgow Print Studio.

=== Public collections ===
Leeds City Gallery, National Museum of Scotland, Edinburgh; Jardine Collection, Royal Edinburgh Hospital, Edinburgh; Scottish National Gallery of Modern Art, Edinburgh; 20th Century Collection of Women's Art, New Hall, Cambridge; Bank of America, London; Hunterian Museum, Glasgow; Highland Council; Gallery of Modern Art, Glasgow.
