= Robert MacLaurin =

Scottish Artist

Robert MacLaurin (born 1961) is a Scottish artist.

== Biography ==
Robert MacLaurin was born in London in June 1961. His early influence was Arnold Balmer his art teacher at Woodleigh School. He studied art at Edinburgh College of Art, graduating with distinction.

MacLaurin was part of a movement focused around the 369 Gallery in Edinburgh, alongside Fionna Carlisle, June Redfern, Ian Hughes, Caroline McNairn and Gwen Hardie. Since receiving his Sir Robert Menzies Fellowship, he lives in Castlemaine, Victoria, Australia.

== Awards and distinctions ==
- Sir Robert Menzies Fellowship, Menzies Foundation, 1995
- Noble Grossart Scottish Painting Prize, 1998
- John Farrell Self Portrait Award, Castlemaine Art Museum, 2005

== Museums and galleries ==
- City of Edinburgh Council
- National Galleries of Scotland
- The Fleming Collection
- University of Edinburgh
- Castlemaine Art Museum

== Exhibitions ==
MacLaurin's exhibitions include:

- Mercury Gallery, Edinburgh, 1987
- 369 Gallery, Edinburgh, 1989
- Benjamin Rhodes Gallery, London, 1991, 1993
- Glasgow Print Studio, 1995
- Niagara Galleries, Melbourne, 1998
- Edinburgh International Festival, 1999
- Berkeley Square Gallery, London, 1990, 1997, 1999, 2001, 2003
- Osborne Samuel Gallery, London, 2006, 2008
- Australian Galleries, Melbourne, 2012
- Open Eye Gallery, Edinburgh, 2016
