= Francesca Alexander =

American artist

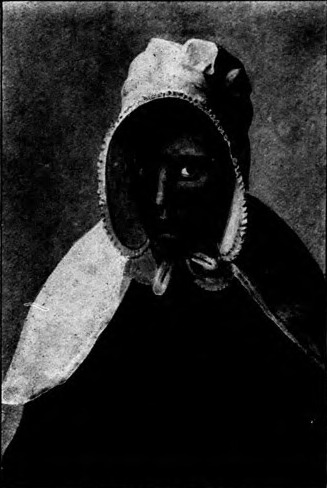
- Born: Esther Frances Alexander; February 27, 1837; Boston, U.S.
- Died: January 21, 1917 (aged 79); Florence, Italy
- Known for: Illustration

Francesca Alexander (born Esther Frances Alexander; February 27, 1837 – January 21, 1917) also known as Fanny Alexander, was an American expatriate illustrator, author, folklorist, and translator.

== Early life ==
Esther Frances Alexander was born in Boston, Massachusetts, on February 27, 1837. Her father was the portrait painter Francis Alexander and her mother Lucia Grey Alexander (née Swett) was a philanthropist from a wealthy Massachusetts family. When she was 16, the family moved to Florence, Italy.

== Career ==
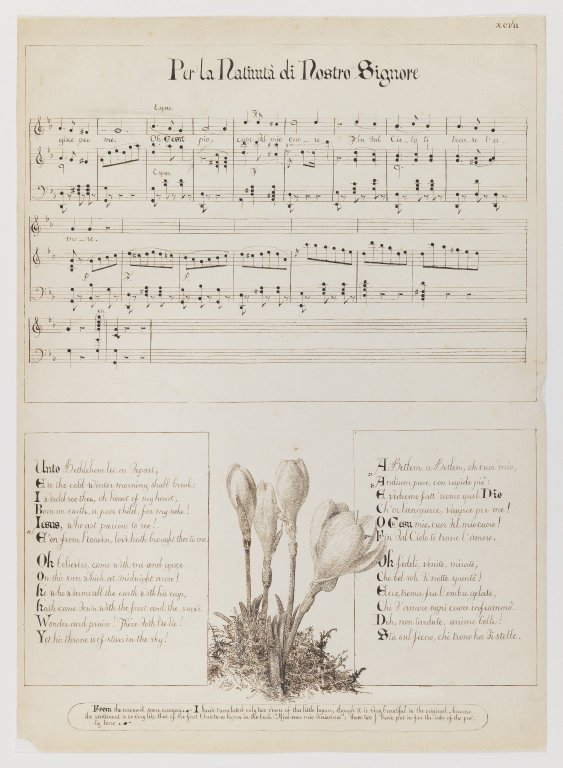
Illustrations by Francesca Alexander

In Italy, Alexander's early artistic output was as part of her mother's charity work and she wrote about and drew portraits of poor Tuscan farmers as gifts for wealthy American donors to their cause. In the process, she became familiar with local folkways and customs, collecting songs and stories and translating them for publication.

In 1882, she was introduced to the English critic John Ruskin by a family friend. He was interested in her work, especially her simple, spiritual illustrations, and purchased two manuscripts from her for £600. The first was published in 1883 as The Story of Ida with its author identified as "Francesca". The volume was republished in several editions in both the United States and Great Britain.

Ruskin published her most celebrated work, Roadside Songs, in 1885. The book drew from the work of celebrated story-teller Beatrice Bernardi of Pian degli Ontani. It also contained a translation of a 17th-century ottava rima ballad with the Italian original opposite the translated English stanzas. A third collection, Christ's Folk in the Apennines, was published in 1887-89.

After Ruskin's death, Alexander published Tuscan Songs (1897) and The Hidden Servants and Other Very Old Stories Told Over (1900).

Alexander was blind and in poor health in her final years. She died in Florence on January 21, 1917. She is buried in the Cimitero degli Allori.

== Selected illustrations ==
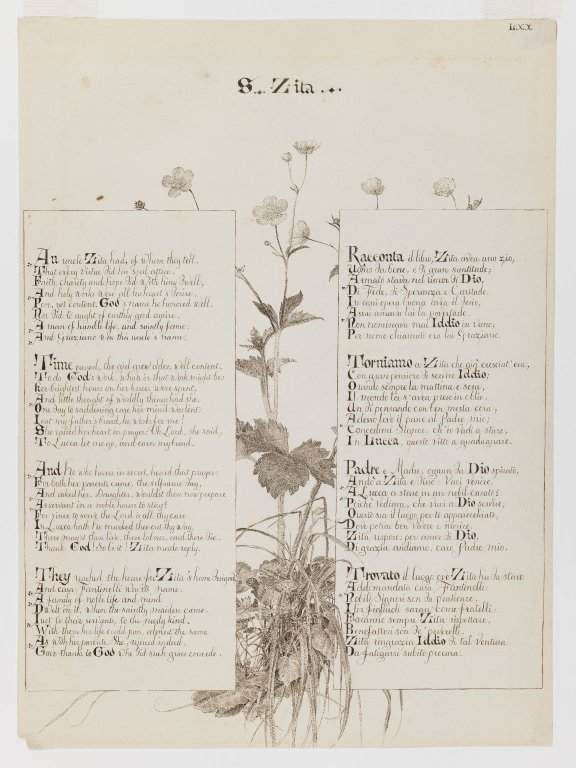
An illustrated page from Roadside Songs of Tuscany

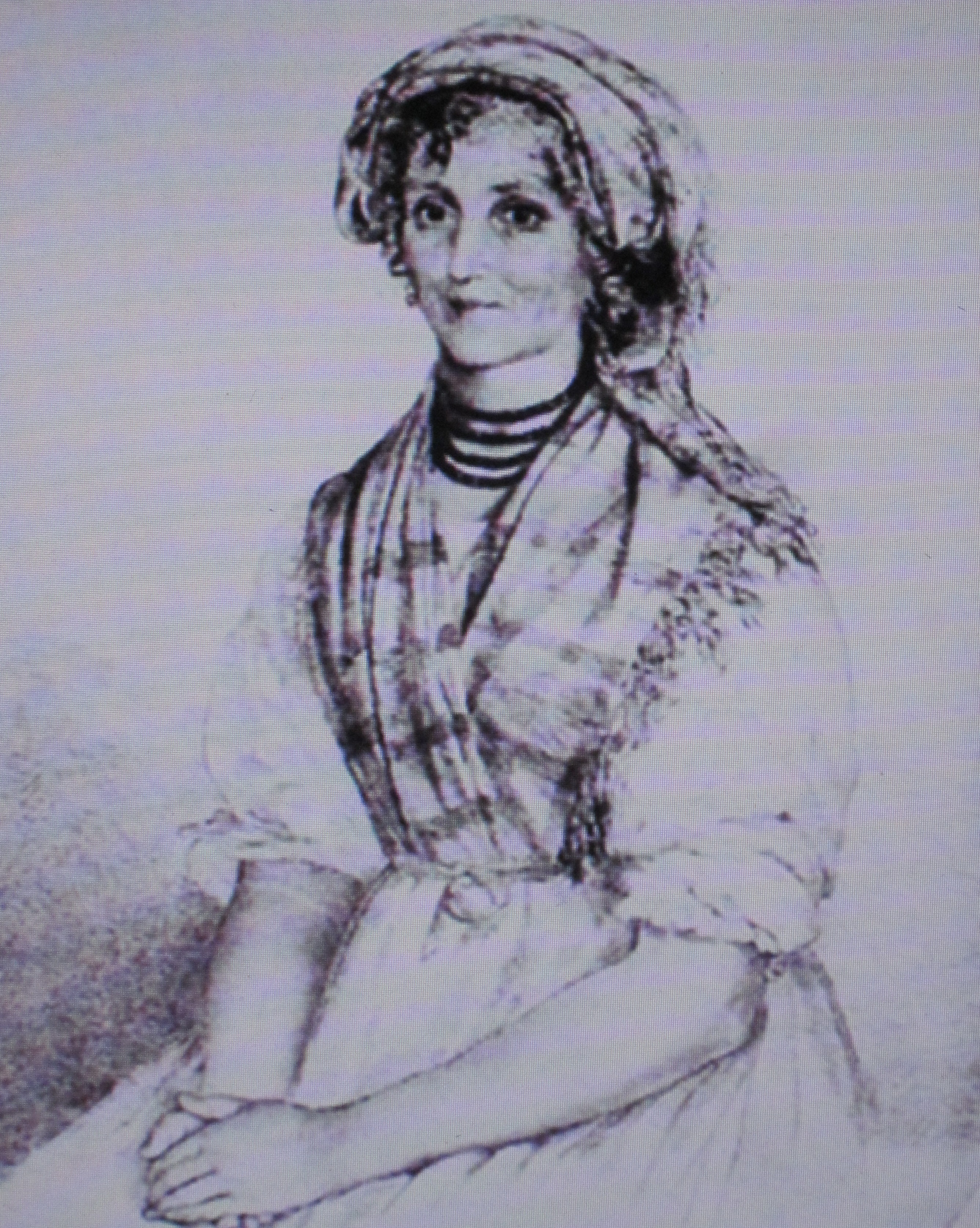
Alexander's drawing of Beatrice di Pian degli Ontani

== Selected writings ==
- 1883 The Story of Ida, John Ruskin, ed. Boston: Cupples, Upham.
- 1884-85 Roadside Songs of Tuscany, Francesca Alexander, tr. and ill. John Ruskin, ed. 4 vols. New York: Wiley.
- 1887-89 Christ's Folk In The Apennini. Reminiscences of Her Friends Among the Tuscan Peasantry. London: George Allen.
- 1897 Tuscan Songs.
- 1900 The Hidden Servants and Other Very Old Stories Told Over.

== Legacy ==
Francesca Alexander's papers are collected in the Boston Athenæum. Correspondence between Alexander and Ruskin and letters from Alexander to Ruskin's cousin and heir Joan Severn are held by the Morgan Library.

Her book The Story of Ida inspired poems by James Russell Lowell and John Greenleaf Whittier
