= Columbian Academy of Painting =

Former art school in New York City

Coordinates: 40.709251°N 74.010814°W

Columbian Academy of Painting was one of the earliest art schools in the United States. It was founded by brothers Archibald and Alexander Robertson in 1792. The school was located in New York at 79 Liberty Street. (Note: Avery states that the school was on Williams Street.)

Robertson and his brother were key in disseminating a conservative taste and mode of expression in America.

— Architecture & Art in New Jersey

It was one of the country's first art schools. Their students included John Vanderlyn, Francis Alexander, and, rare for the time, woman miniaturist Ann Hall. The brothers taught art to amateur and professional students with a wide variety of mediums and subjects. Their methods were based upon those taught in European and British art schools at that time. The Columbian Academy of Art was renamed the Academy of Painting, which continued to be managed by Archibald. (Note: Avery claims that Alexander continued to run the Columbian Academy.) Alexander opened his own art school in 1802.

The school operated for 30 years.
