= Andrew Robertson (miniaturist) =

Scottish miniature painter (1777–1845)

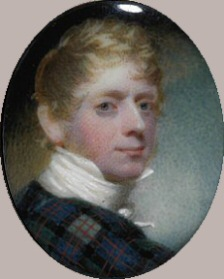
- Self-portrait, 1811
- Born: 1777; Aberdeen, Scotland, Great Britain
- Died: 1845 (aged 67–68)

Andrew Robertson (1777–1845) was a Scottish miniaturist painter.

== Biography ==
Andrew Robertson was born in Aberdeen in 1777. He was the brother of Alexander and Archibald Robertson, who were also painters.

== Works ==
Robertson's self-portrait hangs in the National Portrait Gallery, London.

Robertson created a new style of miniature portrait that became dominant by the middle of the nineteenth century; at least four examples are held in the Victoria and Albert Museum. He broke with previous styles, particularly the work of Richard Cosway, and was critical of these earlier painters, describing their works as 'pretty things but not pictures'. Robertson's style included larger and more detail paintings, usually rectangular, and with a use of paint trying to emulate large oils on canvas, adding more gum to the paint to give it a greater lustre and depth of colour.
