= Laura Cumming =

British journalist and author

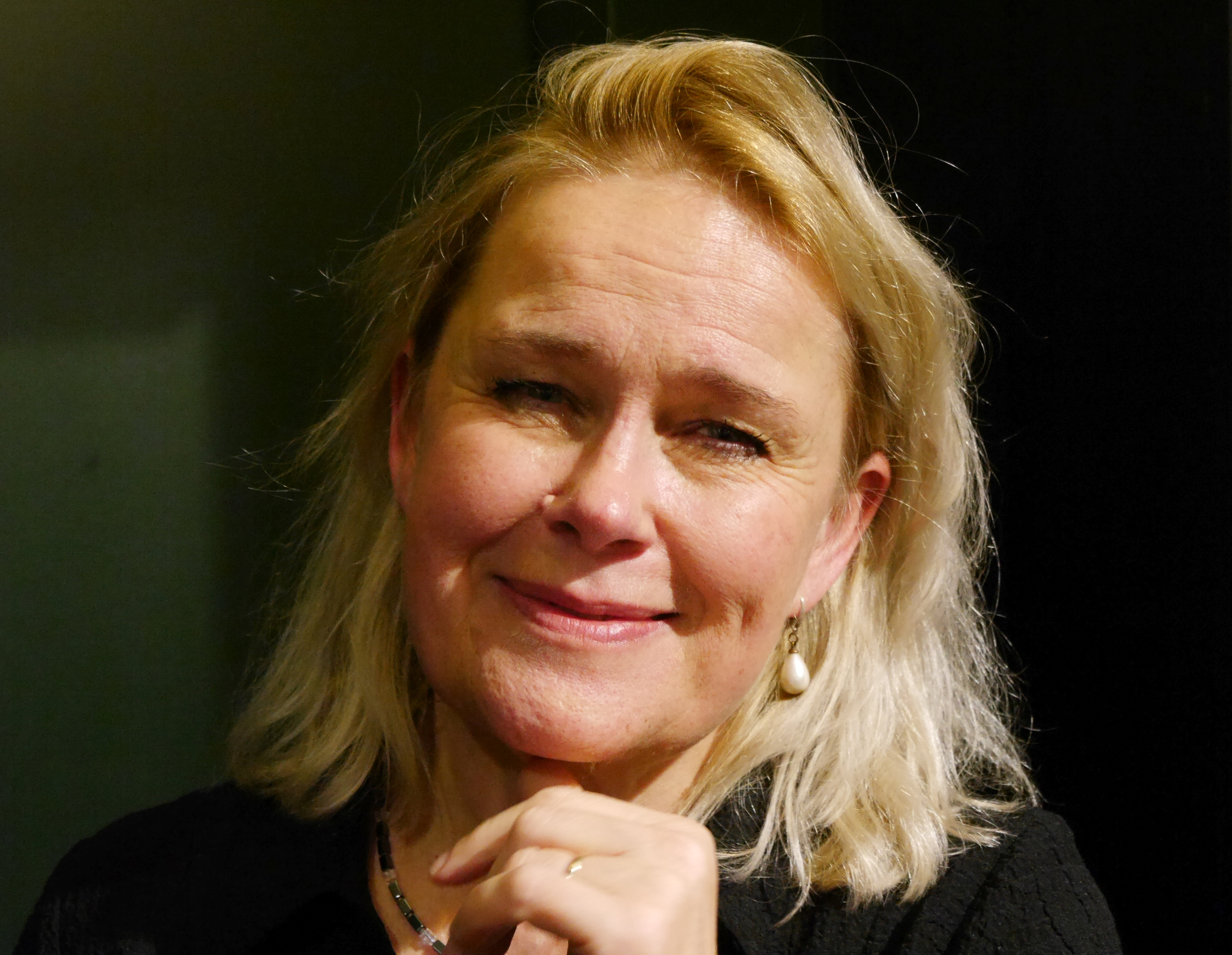
- Laura Cumming, Hatchards, London, 2023
- Occupations: Journalist and art critic
- Years active: c. 1990–present
- Notable work: The Vanishing Man: In Pursuit of Velázquez (2016); On Chapel Sands: My Mother and Other Missing Persons (2019)
- Father: James Cumming

Laura Cumming is a British journalist who is the art critic of The Observer newspaper, a position she has held since 1999. Before that she worked for The Guardian, the New Statesman and the BBC. In addition to her career in journalism, Cumming has written well-received books on self-portraits in art and the discovery of a lost portrait by Diego Velázquez in 1845. The Vanishing Man was a New York Times bestseller and won the James Tait Black Memorial Prize in 2016.

== Early life ==
Cumming is the daughter of the Scottish artists James Cumming and Betty Elston, his wife. She initially studied literature, came to London in her early twenties, and worked there in publishing in the 1980s, though she found her 'sense of life' came 'through streams of pictures' rather than sentences. A memoir based on her mother's disappearance for five days as a child, On Chapel Sands: My Mother and Other Missing Persons, (Note: a.k.a. Five Days Gone: The Mystery of My Mother's Disappearance as a Child, for US Edition) was published in July 2019 by Chatto. It was shortlisted for the 2019 Baillie Gifford Prize.

== Career ==
Cumming was literary editor of the BBC's The Listener, assistant editor of the New Statesman, and the presenter of Nightwaves on BBC Radio 3.

Cumming has written two books on art. Her work on self-portraits, A Face to the World: On Self-Portraits (2009), was praised by Serena Davies in The Daily Telegraph for seeking to "persuade us, with sumptuous superlatives, how great her subjects are" rather than baffling the reader with art theory as some other works do. Her work on the discovery of a lost Diego Velázquez portrait by John Snare in 1845, The Vanishing Man: In Pursuit of Velázquez (2016), was described by Honor Clerk in The Spectator as "a study in obsession, a paean of praise to an artist of genius, a detective story and, for the author, an exorcism of grief". Fisun Güner, in The Independent praised the "beautifully compelling accounts of Velázquez's paintings" that revealed as much about Cumming's own relationship with the work of Velázquez as it did about the ostensible subject of the book. Jonathan Beckman in The Times, however, felt that the book was "breathless" and that its source materials (or lack thereof) didn't completely support the weight that Cumming placed on them. The book was serialised on BBC Radio 4 in a reading by Siobhan Redmond.

Cumming's book On Chapel Sands: My Mother and Other Missing Persons, published in 2019, was shortlisted for the Costa Book award in the Biography and Memoir category, 2019. Her 2023 book, Thunderclap: A Memoir of Art and Life & Sudden Death, received positive reviews; writing for The Washington Post, Becca Rothfeld called it "an autobiography in images that doubles as a tour through the art of the [17th-century] Dutch Golden Age" and noted how "[I]ts elegiac meanderings return time and time again to the figure of Carel Fabritius", while Time included the book on its year-end list of "The 100 Must-Read Books of 2023".

== Selected publications ==
=== UK first editions ===
- Julian Barnes pamphlet Book Trust in association with the British Council, London, 1990.
- A Face to the World: On Self-Portraits. HarperPress, London, 2009. ISBN 9780007118434
- The Vanishing Man: In Pursuit of Velázquez. Chatto & Windus, London, 2016, ISBN 9780701188443
- On Chapel Sands: My Mother and Other Missing Persons. Chatto & Windus, London, 2019, ISBN 9781784742478
- Thunderclap: A Memoir of Art and Life & Sudden Death. Chatto & Windus, London, 2023, ISBN 9781982181765

=== US editions ===
- The Vanishing Velázquez: A 19th-Century Bookseller's Obsession with a Lost Masterpiece Scribner, New York, 2016, ISBN 9781476762159.
- Five Days Gone: The Mystery of My Mother's Disappearance as a Child. Scriber, New York, 2019, ISBN 9781501198717
  - note: US version of On Chapel Sands: My Mother and Other Missing Persons
- Thunderclap: A Memoir of Art and Life & Sudden Death. Scribner, New York, 2023, ISBN 9781982181741
