= James Cumming (artist) =

Scottish painter, lecturer (1922–1991)

James Cumming (1922–1991) was a Scottish painter and lecturer influential in The Edinburgh School in the postwar period.

== Biography ==
Cumming was born in Dunfermline, Scotland, in 1922. His father was superintendent of the local swimming baths, where James swam 100 lengths every morning before school. His mother was a factory worker, James was the first of her three children. He was educated at Dunfermline High School, where he won prizes in several subjects. At the school he was remembered as a serious student who strove for the best results in everything he did. He showed early promise in music, excelling in piano and winning distinction at every grade. His artistic talents were nurtured at school by the teacher and artist George Watson.

He displayed an early determination to become an artist, winning an Andrew Grant Scholarship to attend the Edinburgh College of Art between 1939 and 1947, but his studies were interrupted by the Second World War. He tried to sign up for pilot training early, lying about his age, and eventually, in 1941, joined the Royal Air Force, completed pilot training at Terrell, Texas, in 1944 and served in RAF Transport Command in India and Burma.

Following his service he returned to live with his parents and his studies at Edinburgh College of Art completing his Diploma in 1948 and his postgraduate degree in 1949. He was awarded a Travelling Scholarship, which he used to live and work in the remote island community of Callanish on the Isle of Lewis, Scotland. By living frugally he lived a full two years in Callanish, partly by teaching art at the village school. In this period he made a series of abstracted figurative paintings based on the landscape and figures he there. He continued to paint from these memory for almost 18 years. These are known as the Hebridean paintings, and they later helped to establish Cumming as a painter of The Edinburgh School.

Cumming's work was included in the Scottish Gallery retrospective exhibition in 1993 entitled The Edinburgh School. This exhibition also showed the works of Robin Philipson and William Gillies, both of whom were close artistic and academic associates of Cumming.

=== Teaching ===
Cumming lectured at the Edinburgh College of Art between 1950 and 1982, teaching both in the Humanities and the Painting school. Students of this time included Sandy Moffat, John Bellany and latterly Richard Wright who won the Turner Prize in 2009. Cumming is remembered with great affection for his gentlemanly encouragement, sparkling wit and the range of his intellect. He was elected Academian of the Royal Scottish Academy in 1970 and acted as its Secretary between 1978 and 1980.

=== Family ===
He married the artist Betty Elston in 1953 and their marriage continued until his death in 1991. He was survived by Betty, his son Timothy Cumming, entrepreneur and artist, and daughter Laura Cumming, author and art critic of The Observer newspaper.

== His art ==
The two principal periods in Cumming's painting are the figurative abstraction of the early sixties derived in main part from his Lewis experience and the more geometrical and purer abstraction of the seventies onwards. The "painterly" yet thinly applied textures of Cumming's early work contrasts with the heavy impasto and rich colour themes of his contemporaries in the Edinburgh School. His later colour experimentations were to be as much intellectual as expressive, leading to a deeper synthesis of harmony and contrast. A strong element of fine draughtsmanship is a constant throughout Cumming's work.

Cumming's position in post-war Scottish art is perhaps best summed up by the art critic Duncan Macmillan in 1994: "Cumming and Philipson were ambitious artists who strove to create a genuinely original vision; others achieved as much reputation with less struggle".

The work of Scottish artist Alan Davie, who has achieved an International reputation, and was a contemporary of Cumming, has given rise to many interesting comparisons. This was succinctly put by the critic and artist Edward Gage in 1977: "Cumming's language is drawn logically from scientific research and procedure while Davie's is a haphazard and personal affair of ritual symbols and dances".

Aside from a series of carefully composed still lifes, many of Cumming's later works were derived from investigations into recent discoveries with the electron microscope. This latter period has its apotheosis in the painting 'Metaphase' (Acceleration) 1971, which demonstrates Cummings exceptional abilities in composition, draughtsmanship and his acute colour sensitivity.

Cumming's paintings, spanning a 30-year period, were celebrated in 2012 in a retrospective exhibition of his work at the Talbot Rice Gallery in Edinburgh.

== Chronology ==
- 1922: Born Dunfermline
- 1939–41: Studied Edinburgh College of Art, Andrew Grant Scholar
- 1941–46: Royal Air Force Volunteer Reserve
- 1950: Appointed Tutor in the Painting School, ECA.
- 1951: Royal Scottish Academy Award
- 1958–61: President Society of Scottish Artists
- 1964: Awarded International Scholarship in the Humanities, Harvard USA
- 1966: Retrospective Exhibition, Dunfermline
- 1969–73: Member of the National Broadcasting Council for Scotland.
- 1970: Elected Academician of the Royal Scottish Academy
- 1973–78: Treasurer of the RSA
- 1974: Member of the National Council for Academic Awards, London
- 1978–80: Secretary of the RSA
- 1980: Lothian Region Prize in the RSW Centenary Exhibition
- 1982: Retired from Teaching
- 1990: Saltire Society Award for mural The Community: A Festival of Time, Linlithgow
