= Adrian Wiszniewski =

Scottish artist (born 1958)

Adrian Wiszniewski (born 1958) is a Scottish artist and one of the members of the New Glasgow Boys a group of artists who emerged from Glasgow School of Art and led the resurgence of Scottish figurative painting in the late 20th century. Other members of this group included the late Steven Campbell, who was a close friend of Adrian, Peter Howson and Ken Currie. Under the tutelage of artists like Alexander Moffat in the 1980s the four later went on to attain national and international status.

== Biography ==
Adrian Wiszniewski was born in Glasgow in 1958. He was educated at the Mackintosh School of Architecture and then the Glasgow School of Art from 1979 to 1983. He was influenced by New Image painting in the early 1980s, combining figurative art with social commentary. And he belonged to a group known as the New Glasgow Boys where he played a leading role. They were known in the mid-1980s with their "figure paintings as redolent of fantasy and myth as they were attuned to the workings of contemporary thought and everyday life." He gave his first solo show in 1984 in London and Glasgow; the Tate acquired some of his paintings at that time.

Between 1986 and 1987 his paintings resided at the Walker Gallery, Liverpool. Since then he tried different directions in his work. He was engaged with printmaking, sculpture, installations, furniture and interior design and writing. As an author he explored "new media as a central part of the art of communicating fresh ideas". In 2011 an exhibition of his recent paintings were shown at 108 Fine Art, Harrogate in a collaborative exhibition with the musician and artist Edwyn Collins.

He has worked with the Scottish Philharmonic Orchestra in the production of the musical narrative The Girl, The Boy and The Hag and Adrian wrote and illustrated an accompanying book.

== Awards and distinctions ==
Wiszniewski won the Haldane Trust Award (1982), the David Cargill Scholarship (1983), the Mark Rothko Memorial Award (1984), the I.C.C.F. Best Design Award New York (1993) and the Lord Provost Gold Medal of the City of Glasgow (1999).

== Exhibitions ==
- 1984 Compass Gallery first solo show
- 1987 The Vigorous Imagination: New Scottish Art, Scottish National Gallery of Modern Art
- 2015 Cyril Gerber Fine Art solo show
- 2018, London, Glasgow Print Studio at London Art Fair
- 2018, London, Cyril Gerber Fine Art/ Compass Gallery at London Art Fair
- 2015, London, Glasgow Print Studio at London Original Print Fair
- 2025, Glasgow, ‘’Adrian Wiszniewski: In Full Colour’’ at Glasgow Print Studio

== Museums and galleries ==
Wiszniewski's paintings are held in collections including:

- Metropolitan Museum of Art, New York
- Middlesbrough Museum of Modern Art, Middlesbrough
- Museum of Modern Art
- Setagaya Museum, Tokyo
- Scottish National Gallery of Modern Art, Edinburgh
- Tate Britain, London
- Victoria and Albert Museum, London

== His selected works ==
- The Sculptors Nightmare, pastel on paper, 1984
- Shepherds, oil on canvas
- The Barber, oil on canvas, on panel, 1984
- Highland Mary, gouache on paper, 2011
- Yellow Dog, oil on canvas
- Taking Cuttings, oil on canvas
- The Falls of the Clyde, oil
- Dance of the Maidens, gouache on paper
- Japanese Garden, oil on canvas
- Portrait on a Floral Background, mixed media
- Refugee, mixed media on wood
