= David Loggan =

English painter (1634–1692)

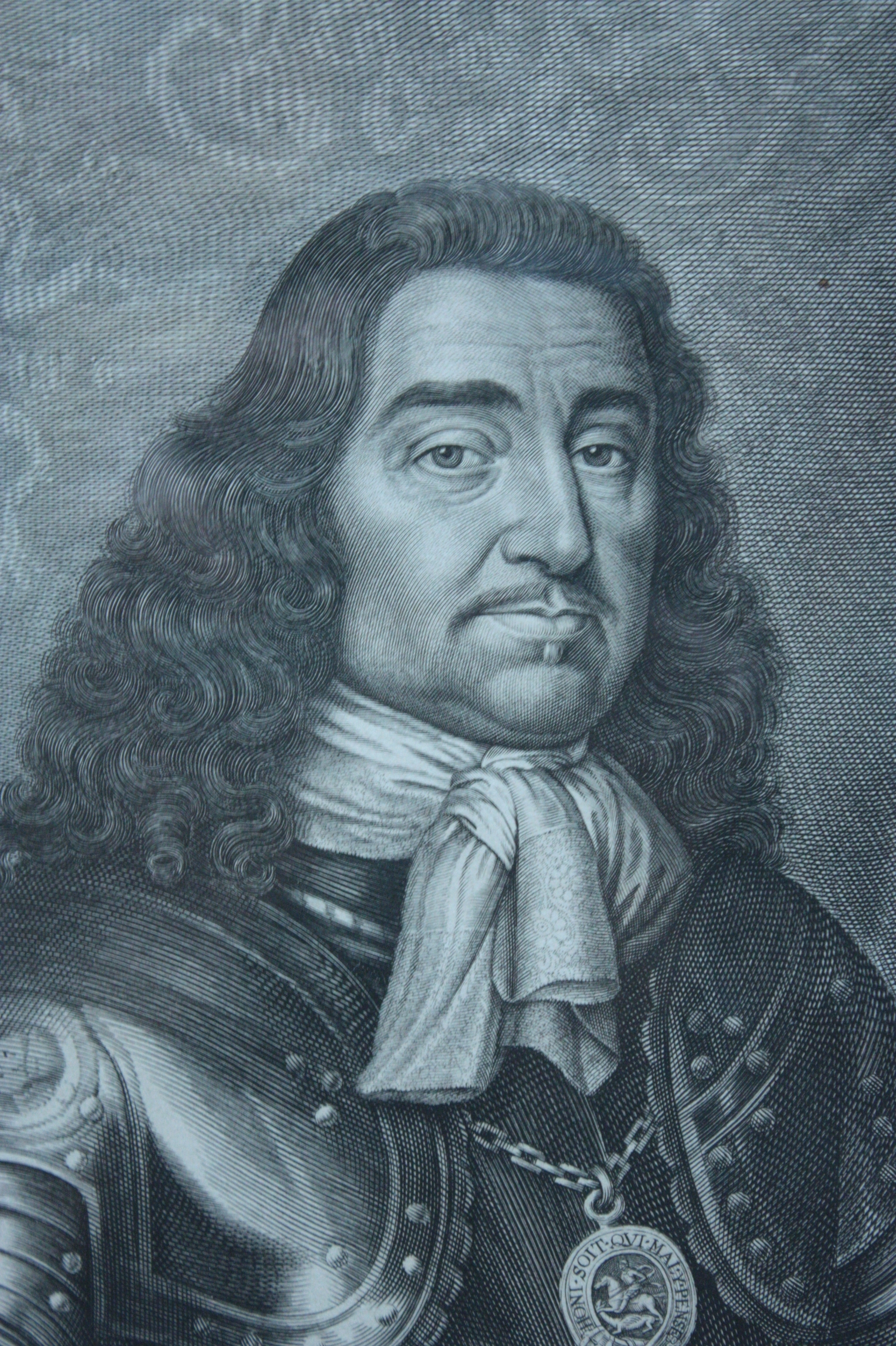
General Monck as engraved by David Loggan, 1661, National Portrait Gallery, London

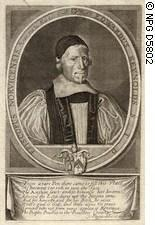
David Loggan, Edward Reynolds, Bishop of Norwich, 1658

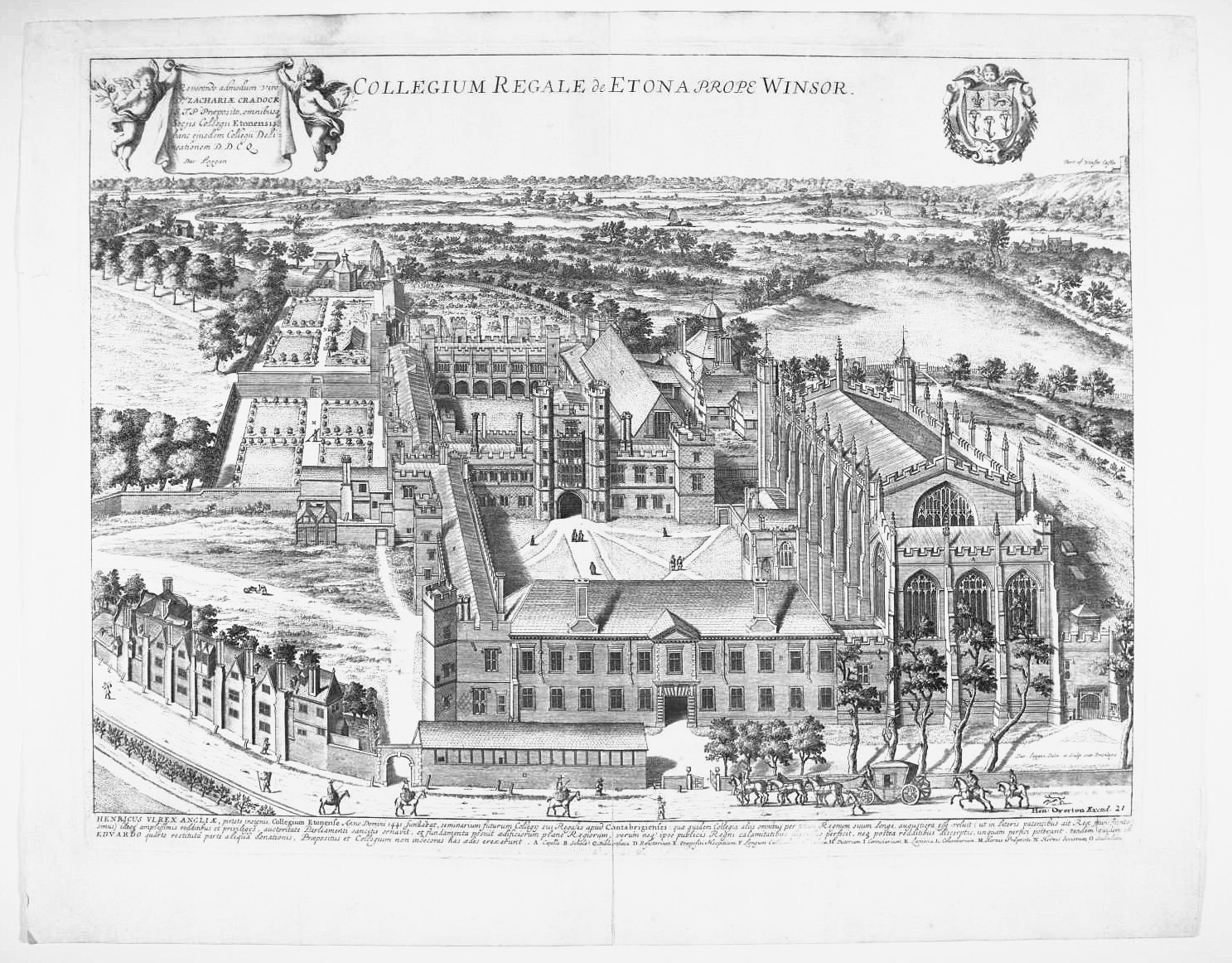
Eton College from Cantabrigia illustrata (1690)

David Loggan (1634–1692) was an English baroque engraver, draughtsman, and painter.

== Life ==
He was baptised on 27 August 1634 in Danzig, then a semi-autonomous city (granted by the Danzig law) within Polish Prussia (Prusy Królewskie) and a member of the Hanseatic League. His parents were English and Scottish, probably merchants or refugees.

The young David first studied in Danzig under Willem Hondius, and later in Amsterdam under Crispijn van de Passe II. He moved to London in the late 1650s. There he produced various engravings, among them the title-page for the folio Book of Common Prayer (1662). In addition, he did a number of miniature portraits as plumbago drawings.

He married in 1663, and in 1665 moved from London to Nuffield, Oxfordshire, to avoid the Great Plague. In 1669, Loggan was appointed "public sculptor" to the University of Oxford. Then he proceeded to draw and engrave all the Oxford colleges in bird's-eye views. His folio Oxonia illustrata was published in 1675.

In 1675, Loggan was naturalised as an English subject. That year he once again settled in London, living in Leicester Fields, where he let rooms to aristocratic patrons and acted as their agent in the acquisition of works of art.

From 1676 he was involved in preparing the new folio Cantabrigia illustrata, which was eventually published in 1690. In that year he was made engraver to Cambridge University.

Loggan was buried on 1 August 1692 in London.

== Major works ==
Loggan's illustrated book on the University of Oxford, Oxonia Illustrata, was a product of several years of dedicated efforts in which he was assisted by Robert White (1645–1704).

His illustrated book on the University of Cambridge, Cantabrigia illustrata (sive, Omnium celeberrimæ istius universitatis collegiorum, aularum, bibliothecæ academicæ scholarum publicarum sacelli coll: regalis / nec non totius oppidi ichnographia.) contains a series of views of the university and its colleges, as well as of Eton College.

More than 100 of his portraits are held by the National Portrait Gallery, London.

== Sources ==
- Cambridge Library
- National Portrait Gallery (London)
