= Francis Alexander (painter) =

American painter (1800–1880)

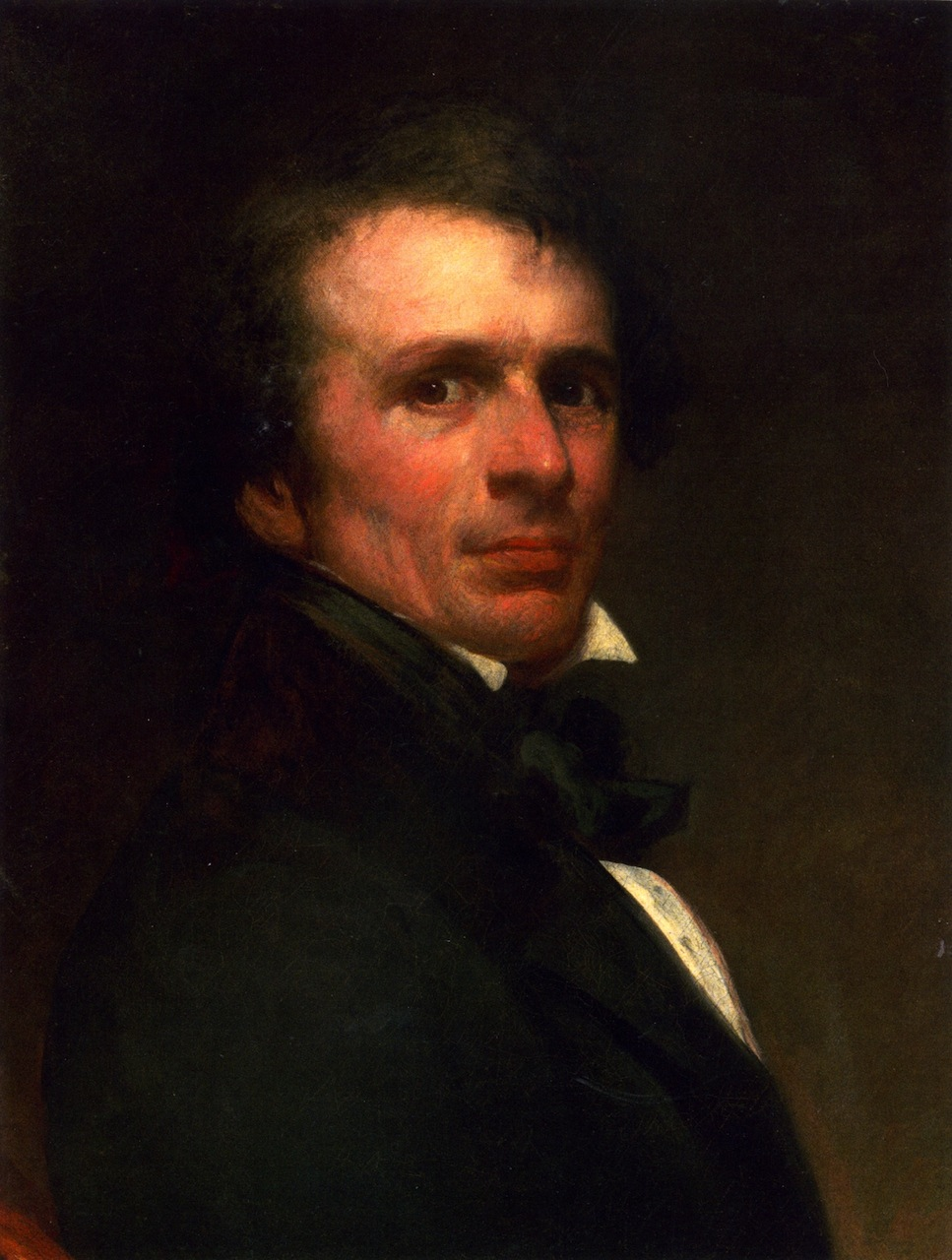
- Self-portrait, c. 1830
- Born: February 3, 1800; Killingly, Connecticut, U.S.
- Died: March 27, 1880 (aged 80); Florence, Italy
- Education: Alexander Robertson
- Known for: Portrait painter
- Spouse: Lucia Grey

Francis Alexander (February 3, 1800 – March 27, 1880) was an American portrait-painter.

== Biography ==
Alexander was born in Windham county Connecticut in February 1800. Brought up on a farm, he taught himself the use of colors, and in 1820 went to New York City and studied painting with Alexander Robertson.

He spent the winters of 1831 and 1832 in Rome. Afterwards, he resided for nearly a decade in Boston, Massachusetts, where he had considerable vogue, and where he painted a portrait of Charles Dickens (1842).

In 1840, he was elected to the National Academy of Design as an honorary member. Francis Alexander died in 1881 in Florence.

== Family ==
Alexander married Lucia Grey Swett in 1836. Their daughter Francesca Alexander was a popular illustrator, author, and translator.

== Works ==
One of Alexander's best portraits is that of Mrs. Fletcher Webster, formerly in the Boston Museum of Fine Arts. This romantic portrait, in which the sitter appears swathed in ermine, was deaccessioned from the Museum early in the 20th century and returned to descendants in the Sargent family.
