= Gwen Hardie =

Scottish artist

Gwen Hardie (born 1962) is a Scottish artist.

== Biography ==
Gwen Hardie was born in Fife, Scotland in 1962. She spent her childhood in Aberdeenshire and studied art at the Edinburgh College of Art. She lived in London and Berlin before moving to the Upper West Side of Manhattan, New York in 2000.

== Awards and distinctions ==
Hardie has been given residencies at the Bogliasco Foundation, Italy; and at Yaddo, MacDowell, the VCCA and the Bogliasco Foundation in America. In 1990, she became the youngest artist to have a solo show at the Scottish National Gallery of Modern Art, Edinburgh.

== Museums and galleries ==
Hardie's work is in collections including the Metropolitan Museum of Art, New York, the British Council, the Scottish National Gallery of Modern Art, Edinburgh, the Gulbenkian Collection, Lisbon, Leicestershire County Council, City of Edinburgh Council, Aberdeen Art Gallery, the Highland Council, Manchester City Galleries, and the University of Edinburgh. She was one of the Scottish artists whose portraits were painted in the 1980s by Alexander Moffat.

== Exhibitions ==
- Sainsbury Centre, Norwich, 2015
- Walker Art Gallery, Liverpool, 2015
- Smoyer Gallery, Roanoke College, USA, 2014
- Garis & Hahn, New York
- The Royal Hibernian Academy, Dublin
- Ann Lanntair and Taigh Chearsabhagh, The Hebrides, Scotland, 2013
