= Alexander Robertson (artist) =

American painter

Alexander Robertson (1772–1841) was a Scottish-American artist. In the 1790s he founded the Columbian Academy of Painting in New York with his brother Archibald Robertson.

== Early life ==
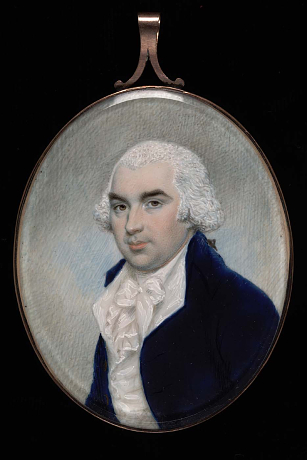
Dr. William Beekman, ca. 1795, watercolor on ivory, sight 2 7/8 x 2 3/8 in. (7.3 x 5.9 cm), Smithsonian American Art Museum

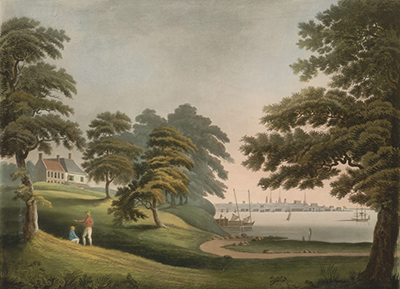
Distant View of New York City with Hobuck Ferry House on the Left, hand-colored engraving, The British Library.

Robertson was born in Monymusk, near Aberdeen, Scotland in 1772. (Note: Dunlap's biography from 1834 states that Robertson was born in 1768.) His father, William Robertson, was a draftsman and architect. Alexander was the middle of three artistic brothers; the others were Archibald and Andrew.

== Education ==
Robertson, who was a miniaturist, studied art in Scotland and then in London at the Royal Academy of Art. He was also taught by his brother Archibald.

== Career ==
Robertson painted miniature portraits and landscapes, influenced by William Sawrey Gilpin. He engraved, and among his works are some topographical engravings. Archibald and Alexander collaborated on the engravings and other works.

With his brother Archibald, Robertson came to the United States to teach art at the invitation of several wealthy individuals. Archibald arrived in 1791, and Alexander joined his brother in the autumn of 1792. In the 1790s the brothers established the Columbian Academy of Painting in New York on William Street. It was one of the country's first art schools. Their students included John Vanderlyn, Francis Alexander, and, rare for the time, a woman miniaturist named Ann Hall. Alexander taught painting and drawing. The brothers taught art to amateur and professional students with a wide variety of mediums and subjects. Their methods were based upon those taught in European and British art schools at that time.

Around 1800 Alexander drew an illustration of Mount Vernon in Virginia, home of George Washington. This work was engraved by Francis Jukes of London shortly thereafter.

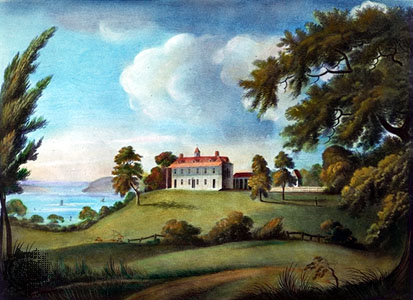
Mount Vernon, after Alexander Robertson, aquatint by Francis Jukes, circa 1800

Robertson opened his own art school in 1802. The Columbian Academy of Art was renamed the Academy of Painting, which continued to be managed by Archibald. (Note: Avery claims that Alexander continued to run the Columbian Academy.)

Robertson exhibited at the American Academy of the Fine Arts (AAFA) in New York and was made director in 1816. Both of the Robertson brothers were active in the management of the AAFA. From 1817 to 1825 Alexander was the school's secretary. He was the curator from 1820 to 1835. In 1821 he became an honorary member of the Academy of Fine Arts in South Carolina.

Robertson traveled along the Mohawk and Hudson rivers and captured the landscape and towns in a travel sketchbook of pen and ink drawings. According to Elizabeth Allen, "Robertson's stylized approach reveals a preconceived notion of what a landscape should look like, based upon his exposure to the topographical tradition of Great Britain. It was up to the next generations of American landscape artists to free themselves from the restraints of that tradition to produce drawings that were more spontaneous and more faithful to nature."

== Personal life ==
Robertson married Miss Provost, who was the niece of Bishop Provost.

== Death ==
Robertson died in New York in 1841.

== Collections ==
His works are in the following collections:

- Albany Institute of History & Art
- British Library
- Brooklyn Museum of Art
- Metropolitan Museum of Art
- Smithsonian Institution
