= John Snare =

English bookseller and publisher

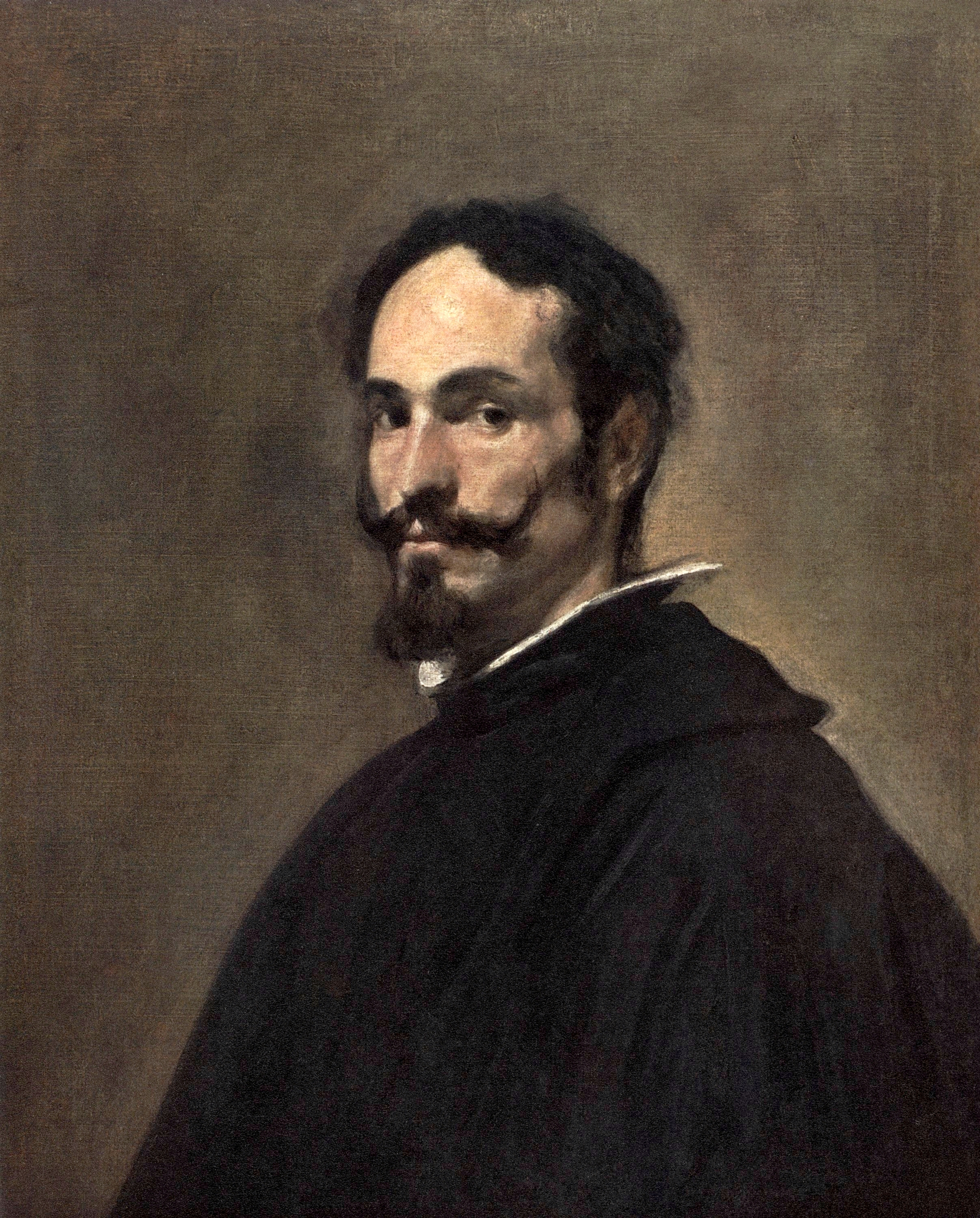
Diego Velázquez, Portrait of a Man (possibly José Nieto), c. 1635–45. Oil on canvas, Apsley House, London.

John Snare (christened 31 July 1808 born c.1811, died 10 January 1884) was a bookseller and publisher from Reading, England, whose life was dominated by the discovery at a country house auction in 1845 of a hitherto lost Diego Velázquez painting, which Snare identified as a young Charles Stuart. It was supposed that the portrait was painted in 1623 during Charles' eight-month visit to Spain where the future monarch failed in his attempt to secure the hand of the Spanish Habsburg princess Maria Anna. A protracted court case in Scotland with trustees from the estate of the Earl of Fife arose over the ownership of the work and this eventually brought Snare to financial ruin. Following the trial, Snare emigrated to New York City. After Snare's death, the Velázquez passed to Snare's son, and went on display briefly in 1885 at the Metropolitan Museum of Art. The painting has not been seen again since. No images of the work survive, only Snare's written descriptions of the painting.

In 2016, Snare's story was told by Observer art critic Laura Cumming in her book, The Vanishing Man: A 19th Century Bookseller's Obsession with a Lost Masterpiece (Chatto & Windus).

== Selected publications ==
- The Post-Office Reading directory. Compiled ... by John Snare. John Snare, Reading, 1842.
- Snare's map of the country ten miles round Reading, compiled ... under the superintendence of M. Dodd. Reading, 1846. (map)
- The history and pedigree of the portrait of Prince Charles (afterwards Charles I) painted by Velasquez in 1623. 1847.
- A brief description of the portrait of Prince Charles, afterwards Charles the First, painted at Madrid, in 1623, by Velasquez: now exhibiting at No. 21, Old Bond Street, London. London, 1847.
