= David Paton (artist) =

- Died: in or after 1709
- Known for: Portrait miniature
- Patrons: Elizabeth Maitland, Duchess of Lauderdale

David Paton was a Scottish artist active between 1660–1700.

He is known for his high quality Portrait miniatures and is considered one of the best draughtsmen in late seventeenth-century Britain. He worked mainly in plumbago, pencil and sepia, but also painted portraits in oil.

== Biography ==
His earliest known works are copies of oils formerly in the collection of Charles I by Giovanni Cariani and Titian dating from 1667. Paton also copied works of older contemporary Samuel Cooper including the famous 1665 large rectangular miniature of Charles II. One copy, signed and dated 1668, is at Ham House, the other, a year later, is in the collection of the duke of Buccleuch.

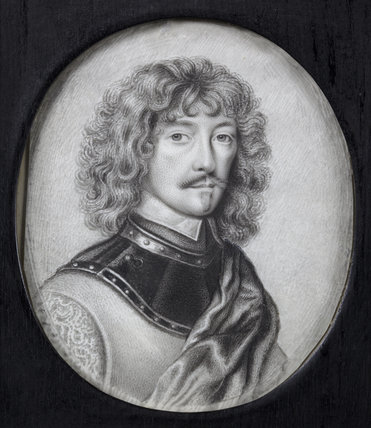
William Murray, 1st Earl of Dysart Portrait miniature by David Paton

A copy by Paton after the miniature of William Murray, 1st Earl of Dysart, attributed to David des Granges, is also at Ham House as are both the original and Paton's copy of John Hoskins' large rectangular limning of Murray's wife; Katherine Bruce, dated 1638.

Paton is known to have been in Italy in the 1670s and 1680s with The Hon. William Tollemache (1662–1694), the youngest son of his patron, Murray's daughter; Elizabeth Maitland, Duchess of Lauderdale, on his Grand Tour. Paton's self-portrait, a miniature dated 1683, is held in the collection of the Uffizi Gallery, Florence.

Following the tour, Paton appears to have worked mainly in Edinburgh. Perhaps Paton's most notable work, The Yester Lords dates from this period, now thought to depict John Maitland, and his younger brother Charles (c.1620–1691) and not, as previously believed, members of the Hay family, who lived at Yester House.

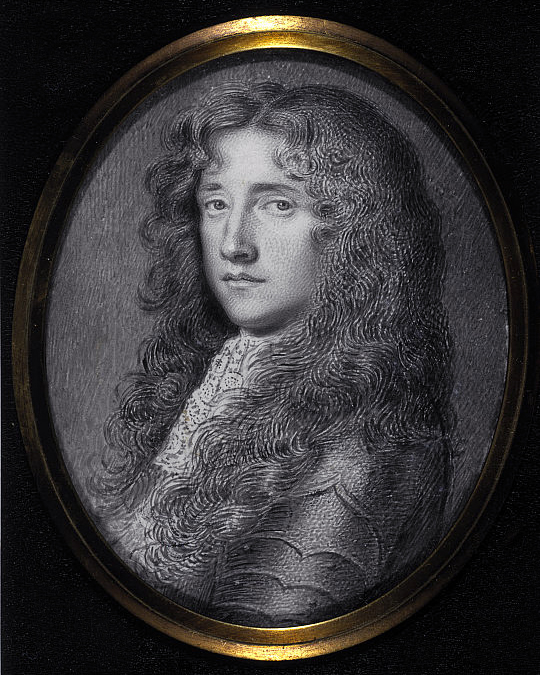
John Graham of Claverhouse, Viscount (‘Bonnie’) Dundee by David Paton

Paton's other works of the period include Jacobite leader John Graham of Claverhouse, Viscount (‘Bonnie’) Dundee, Charles II; James Scott, First Earl of Dalkeith; Sir John Dalrymple, 1st Earl of Stair; and William III (1695), Sir John Clerk of Penicuik, First Baronet, Charles Stuart, 4th Earl of Traquair and his wife, Mary Maxwell, Countess of Traquair.

Three groups, each containing five small medallion portraits (chiefly of members of the Hamilton family), which were at Hamilton Palace, Lanarkshire, bear his name and the date 1693. In 1698 he received £2 18s. for a picture for James Douglas, 2nd Duke of Queensberry, and £5 16s. from the same source the year after.

A portrait of General Tam Dalyell of the Binns was also ascribed to Paton. Other works include a portrait of Sir Isaac Newton sent to Cosimo III de' Medici, Grand Duke of Tuscany in 1708, his last documented work.
