= Plumbago drawing =

Graphite portraits of the 17th and 18th centuries

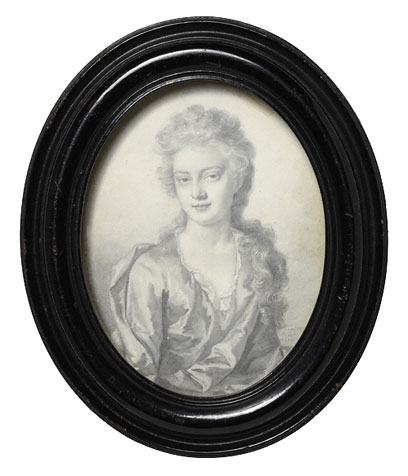
Thomas Forster, worked 1690–1717. Portrait of Lady Anne Churchill, dated 1700. Graphite on vellum Museum no. P.20-1910. Victoria and Albert Museum, London.

Plumbago drawings are graphite drawings from the 17th and 18th centuries. There was a group of artists whose work in plumbago is remarkable for their portraits drawn with finely pointed pieces of graphite and on vellum. These works were initially prepared as the basis of an engraving. Eventually they would be produced as works in their own right.

== Early artists in plumbago ==
One of the earliest of this group of workers was Simon Van de Pass (1595–1647), and his pencil drawings were probably either for reproduction on silver tablets or counters or for engraved plates. The earlier miniature painters also drew in this manner, notably Nicholas Hilliard in preparing designs for jewels and seals, and Isaac Oliver and Peter Oliver in portraits.

A few pencil portraits by Abraham Blooteling, the Dutch engraver, have been preserved, which appear to have been first sketches, from which plates were afterwards engraved. David Loggan (1635–1700), a pupil of Van de Pass, also left a few portraits, as a rule drawn on vellum and executed with dexterity.

These works were not always prepared for engraving. There is one representing Charles II, set in a gold snuff box, which was given by the King to the Duchess of Portsmouth, and which went to the Duke of Richmond, and a similar portrait of Oliver Cromwell which was in the possession of Lord Verulam; and there are no engravings corresponding to these.

== Later works ==
William Faithorne (1616–1691) derived much of his skill from the time he spent with Robert Nanteuil, whose style he followed. There are drawings by him in the Bodleian Library, at Welbeck Abbey and at Montagu House, and two fine portraits in the British Museum. Thomas Forster (c. 1695–1712) was one of the major draughtsmen in this form of portraiture, on vellum and on paper. His work was at Welbeck Abbey, in the Holburne Museum at Bath, in the Victoria and Albert Museum and elsewhere.

Robert and George White, were English artists, father and son. The former (1645–1704) was a pupil of Loggan and a prolific engraver, and most of his drawings executed on vellum were for the purpose of engraving. George White (c. 1684–1732) was taught by his father, and finished some of his father's plates. Forster and the two Whites signed their drawings and dated them. By Robert White there are portraits of John Bunyan and Sir Matthew Hale in the British Museum, and his own portrait at Welbeck; and by him and his son there are other drawings, depicting Sir Godfrey Kneller, Archbishop Tenison and others.

The two John Fabers, John Faber the Elder (c.1660–1721) and John Faber the Younger (1684–1756), were Dutch; they usually added drawn inscriptions, often found within circles around the portraits and occasionally extending to many lines below them. The son was the more significant artist, known for mezzotints. The portrait painter Jonathan Richardson (1665–1745) executed many drawings in pencil, examples of which can be seen in the British Museum.

The Scot David Paton was working in 1670. Most of his drawings belonged to the Earl of Dysart and were at Ham House; examples of his portraiture were in the possession of the Daizell family. Paton was attached to the court of Charles II, when the king was in Scotland; at that time he drew his portrait of the King. There are drawings of the same character as his, the work of George Glover (d. 1618) and Thomas Cecill (fl. 1630), but they were evidently studies for engravings. A Swiss artist, Joseph Werner (b. 1637) drew in pencil, adopting brown paper as the material on which his best drawings were done, and in some cases heightening them with touches of white paint.

Later miniature artists, including Nathaniel Hone, Grimaldi, Bernard Lens and John Downman, also drew in plumbago. Other exponents of this art were Thomas Worlidge (1700–1766), F. Steele (c. 1714), W. Robins (c. 1730), G. A. Wolffgang (1692–1775), George Vertue the engraver (1684–1756), Johann Zoffany (1733–1810), and the Swede, Charles Bancks (c. 1748).
