= David Harding (artist) =

Scottish artist (1937–2026)

David Harding OBE
- Born: 3 March 1937; Leith, Edinburgh, Scotland
- Died: 21 February 2026 (aged 88)
- Education: Edinburgh College of Art, Moray House College of Education
- Occupations: Artist and teacher
- Known for: Glenrothes town artist and Head of Environmental Art at Glasgow School of Art
- Notable work: Henge, Industry, Heritage
- Website: www.davidharding.net

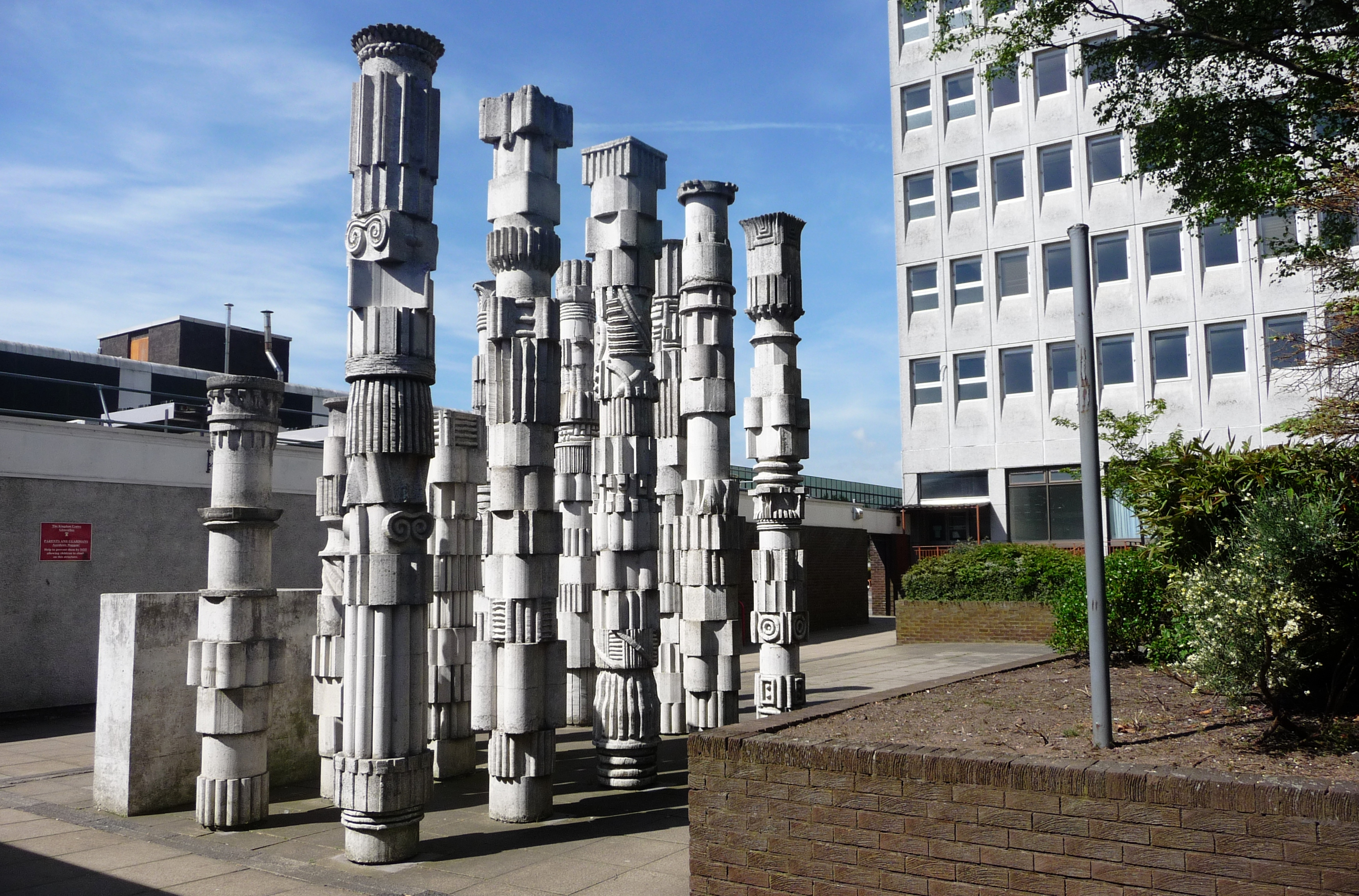
Heritage, a sculpture in Glenrothes by David Harding - as shown in its original location at Falkland Gate pre-2009

David Harding (3 March 1937 – 21 February 2026) was a Scottish artist best known for his residency as a town artist in the new town of Glenrothes and as Head of Environmental Art at Glasgow School of Art.

== Early life and education ==
Born in Leith on 3 March 1937 to ship's plumber Alfred Harding and his wife Kathleen (nee Murray), from 1955 to 1959 Harding attended Edinburgh College of Art, where he studied the sculptural use of glass, concrete and ceramics. He attended Moray House College of Education in 1960.

== Career ==
From 1961 to 1963, Harding taught in various schools in Scotland before moving to Nigeria (1963–1967) to work in the art department in a bush teacher training college. He returned from Nigeria at the age of 30 and decided to give up teaching, instead undertaking sculpture commissions.

Having spent a year as a self-employed artist, Harding answered an advert in The Scotsman for a post with Glenrothes Development Corporation. From 1968 to 1978 he was town artist, working with the planning department to create site-specific work using the same concrete and brick as the newly developed housing. His works in Glenrothes include Henge, a spiral of cast concrete slabs; Industry, a mural on an underpass based on patterns on African huts; Heritage, rows of concrete embossed columns; Dark Cemetery in Pitteuchar; and ten poetry slabs at bus stops, phone boxes, and the Glenwood shopping centre. Henge and Industry are now listed. As his assistant, Stanley Bonnar created a concrete hippo; Harding and Bonnar placed them in groups at multiple sites in the town.

From 1978 to 1985, he lectured at Dartington College of Art in the department of Art and Social Contexts.

In 1985 Harding started teaching the new subject of Environmental Art at Glasgow School of Art; he eventually became Head of Environmental Art and Sculpture. Several of Harding's former students have been nominated for or received the Turner Prize. He retired in 2001.

== Personal life and death ==
Harding married Frances McKechnie in 1962. They had six children.

Harding died after a short illness at a hospital, on 21 February 2026, at the age of 88.

== Exhibitions ==
- You Like This Garden?, (with Ross Birrell) Portikus, Frankfurt, 2011.
- Winter Line (with Ross Birrell), Kunsthalle Basel, Basel, 2014.
- Where language ends (with Ross Birrell), Talbot Rice Gallery, Edinburgh, 14 March – 2 May 2015.
- Grey Gardens, Dundee Contemporary Arts, Dundee, 2016.
- Documenta 14, (with Ross Birrell) Athens and Kassel, 2017.

== Honours ==
Harding was appointed an Officer of the Order of the British Empire (OBE) in the 2002 New Year Honours for services to higher education, and in 2018 he was made an honorary D.Litt by the University of Glasgow.
