= Caroline McNairn =

Scottish painter (1955–2010)

- Born: 16 May 1955; Selkirk, Scotland
- Died: 29 September 2010 (aged 55); Melrose, Scotland
- Known for: Painting
- Spouse: Hugh Collins

Caroline McNairn (16 May 1955 – 29 September 2010) was a Scottish figurative painter.

== Biography ==
Caroline McNairn was born in Selkirk in 1955. Her father (John McNairn) and grandfather (also John McNairn) were also painters. Her father died in 2009 aged 98 and he, too, had studied at Edinburgh College of Art in the 1920s, and then in the early 1930s in Paris under Othon Friesz, a friend and pupil of Cezanne. Caroline was therefore only 2 steps away from the father of modern art and his work had a marked influence on her. She studied art at the University of Edinburgh and then Edinburgh College of Art.

In the early 1980s, McNairn was one of the first of a new generation of Scottish expressionist artists to exhibit in New York and Chicago, promoted by the 369 Gallery in Edinburgh, with which she had been closely associated from its foundation in 1978, not only as a regular exhibitor but also as an inspiring teacher and artistic adviser. She had a critically acclaimed and ground-breaking show in 1986 at the cutting edge Avenue B Gallery in Manhattan, where her work was admired by Keith Haring and Jean-Michel Basquiat. In the same year, she also had shows in Hong Kong, Los Angeles and Santa Fe, and in 1990 spent a year working in the Soviet Union exhibiting with the notorious Kievsky Station Group in Moscow and Odessa.

McNairn was one of a group of artists, including Fionna Carlisle, June Redfern and Ian Hughes, who were closely associated with 369, an innovative Edinburgh gallery that opened in 1978. It was there that McNairn held four solo exhibitions, acted as a lecturer and adviser and, in the late 1980s, met Hugh Collins, her future husband, once dubbed Scotland's most dangerous prisoner, where Collins was serving a life sentence for the knifing murder of rival gangster William 'Willie' Mooney in the Glasgow pub Lunar Seven on 7 April 1977. Collins was on day release from the special unit of HM Prison Barlinnie. McNairn played a vital role in Collins' rehabilitation. Collins was released from prison in 1993 and they married soon afterwards. Collins became a sculptor and author whose first book, Autobiography of a Murderer, was published in 1997.

On 29 September 2010, aged 55, McNairn died of cervical cancer.

== Exhibitions ==
- Avenue B Gallery, New York, 1986
- Summerhall (Edinburgh Art Festival), 2014 (posthumous)
- Hawick Museum, 2010 (posthumous)

== Museums and galleries ==
- Pushkin Museum of Fine Arts, Moscow
- Scottish National Gallery of Modern Art, Edinburgh
