= Archibald Robertson (painter) =

American painter

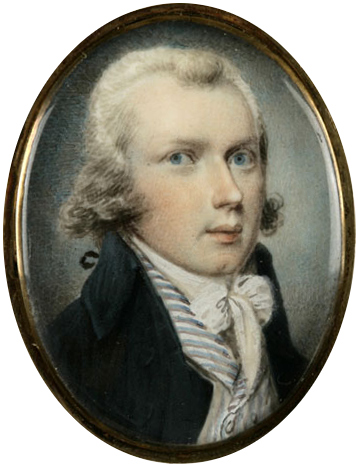
Archibald Robertson (1765 1835), self-portrait, ca 1790 1795

Archibald Robertson (May 8, 1765 – December 6, 1835) was a Scottish born painter who operated the Columbian Academy of Painting in New York with his brother Alexander. Known for his miniature portrait paintings, he was asked to paint George and Martha Washington soon after coming to the United States from Scotland. He also made watercolor landscape paintings and engravings. His book Elements of the Graphic Arts was published in 1802.

== Early life ==
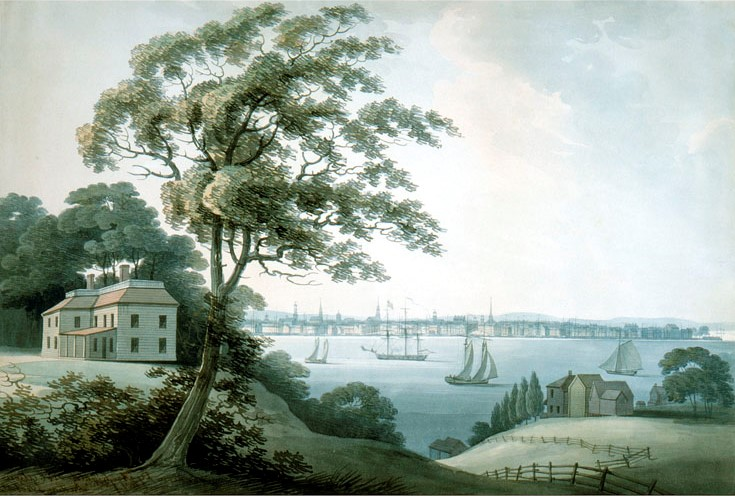
New York seen from Long Island, 1795

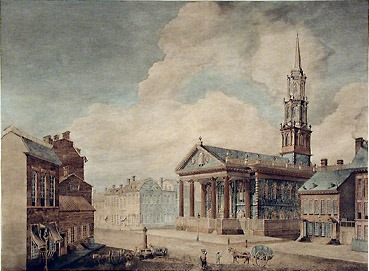
New York St. Paul's Chapel, 1799

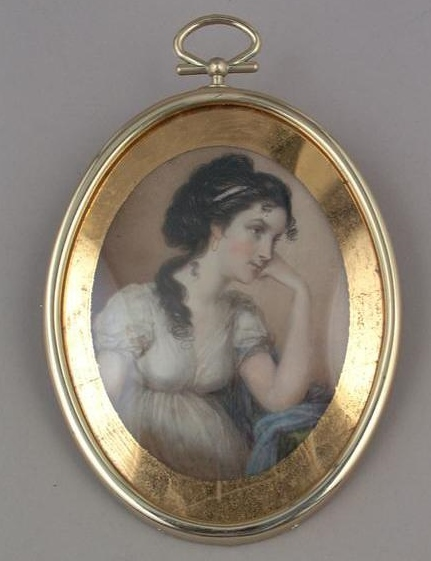
Archibald Robertson, Eliza Abramse Robertson, 1794, watercolor on ivory

Robertson was born in Monymusk, (Note: Sidney Lee states that his father was of Drumnahoy, near Aberdeen. Archibald's gravestone says that he was born in Monymusk.) near Aberdeen on May 8, 1765. His mother was Jean Ross and his father, William Robertson, was a draftsman and architect. He was the eldest of three artistic brothers, which included Alexander and Andrew.

== Education ==
Robertson attended Marischal College in Aberdeen from 1782 to 1786, where he studied art. He then studied art in Edinburgh. (Note: Avery stated that Robertson studied art in EDinburgh before 1786, but did not provide a college or university name.) In 1786 began his studies with Joshua Reynolds and Benjamin West in London. He also studied art at the Royal Academy of Arts.

== Career ==
Robertson opened an art school and studio in Aberdeen, Scotland following his training in London. Robertson was a successful painter of portraits and miniature portraits. He also engraved, including topographical engravings. Archibald and Alexander collaborated on works, like the engravings.

Archibald came to the United States in 1791 at the invitation of several wealthy individuals to teach art. He was asked to paint the portrait of George and Martha Washington.

Alexander joined his brother in the United States in the autumn of 1792. They established the Columbian Academy of Painting in New York on William Street. It was one of the country's first art schools. The Columbian Academy of Art was renamed the Academy of Painting, which continued to be managed by Archibald. (Note: Avery claims that Alexander continued to run the Columbian Academy.) Alexander opened his own art school in 1802.

Both of the Robertson brothers were active exhibitors and involved in the management of the American Academy of the Fine Arts (AAFA) in New York. Archibald joined in 1817 and was on the board of directors for 15 years.

In New York, Archibald made watercolor landscape paintings of the Hudson River Valley and New York City. In 1802 he had the book, Elements of Drawing, of his systematized approach toward drawing for amateur artists. His approach was inspired by William Sawrey Gilpin.

== Personal life ==
Robertson met Eliza Abramse in the United States and married her in December, 1794 and made several portraits of her. He taught her to paint with watercolors and her work was exhibited at the American Academy of Fine Arts. They had a son, Anthony Lispenard Robertson, who was an attorney and became chief justice. He was the fourth son of many children the couple had.

== Death ==
Roberson died December 6, 1835. He is buried at Green-Wood Cemetery in Brooklyn, New York.

== Published works ==
He published the following books:

- Elements of the Graphic Arts, 1802
- On the Art of Sketching, about 1800, manuscript
- A book on the art of miniature painting
