= Eulabee Dix =

American painter

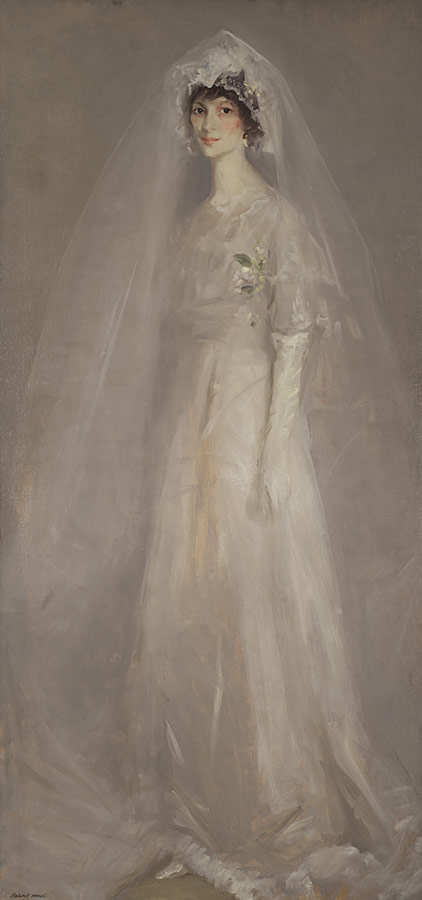
- Girl in Wedding Gown (Mrs. Eulabee Dix Becker), painting by Robert Henri, 1910.
- Born: October 5, 1878; Greenfield, Illinois, United States
- Died: June 14, 1961 (aged 82); Waterbury, Connecticut, United States
- Known for: Painting
- Movement: Miniaturism, Still life

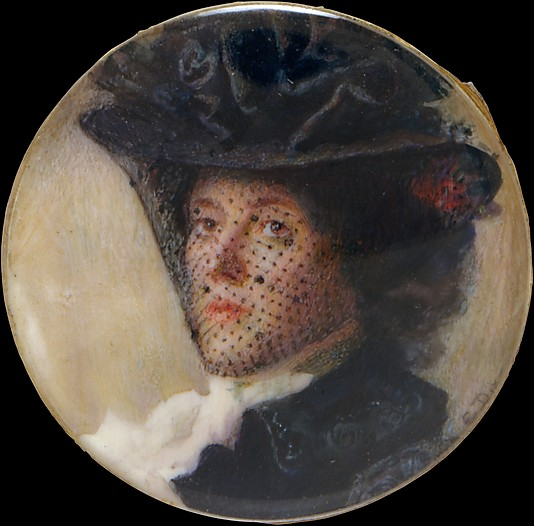
Eulabee Dix, Mrs. Cox, watercolor on ivory, 2" in diameter, c. 1907, Metropolitan Museum of Art

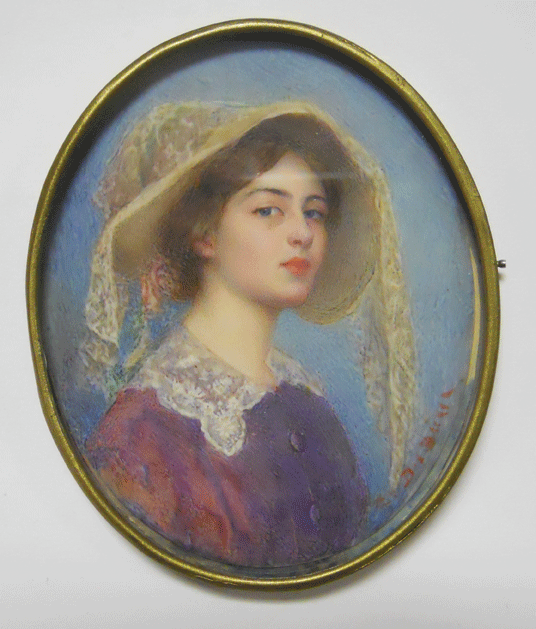
Eulabee Dix, Woman in Lace Trimmed Hat, c. 1911, watercolor on ivory, 4 1/8 x 3 1/4 in. (oval). Donated by Mrs. Philip Dix Becker and Family

Eulabee Dix Becker (October 5, 1878 – June 14, 1961) was an American artist, who favoured the medium of watercolours on ivory to paint portrait miniatures. During the early 20th century, when the medium was at the height of fashion, she painted many prominent figures, including European nobility and famous actresses of the day.

== Early life ==
Dix was born in Greenfield, Illinois, to Mary Bartholomew and Horace Wells Dix, She had an early interest in art, and her talents and love of reading were encouraged from an early age. Her family moved several times during her early years due to financial setbacks. During her teens, Dix went to live with wealthy family members in St. Louis, where she attended Washington University in St. Louis, and spent a year studying oil painting and life drawing at the St. Louis School of Fine Arts. Her work there was recognised with two medals. Dix returned to her parents in 1895, when they set up home in Grand Rapids, Michigan. There she taught art classes, and was inspired by the daughter of an Episcopal minister to paint portrait miniatures.

== New York studies ==
In 1899 Dix moved to New York City, where she first studied with William Merritt Chase, however she left after one week, partly due to Chase's focus on oil painting, and also because she disagreed with his philosophy of colour. She went on to continue her studies at the Art Students League with George Bridgman, of whom she did approve. She also underwent tuition with William J. Whittemore, who taught her the technique of painting on ivory. Whittlemore was a founder of the recently established American Society of Miniature Painters (ASMP), where she exhibited some of her work. She also studied under Isaac A. Josephi, who was the first president of the ASMP.

== Carnegie Hall Towers studio ==
Dix took a tiny studio apartment at 152 West 57th Street, on the 15th floor of one of the Carnegie Hall towers. Here she worked on commissions for many prominent New Yorkers, including the actress Ethel Barrymore and photographer Gertrude Käsebier. By coincidence her neighbour, Frederick S. Church, was also from Grand Rapids, and he helped her make contacts within New York artistic circles. Miniaturist Theodora Thayer, whom Dix associated with and admired, also had a studio nearby.

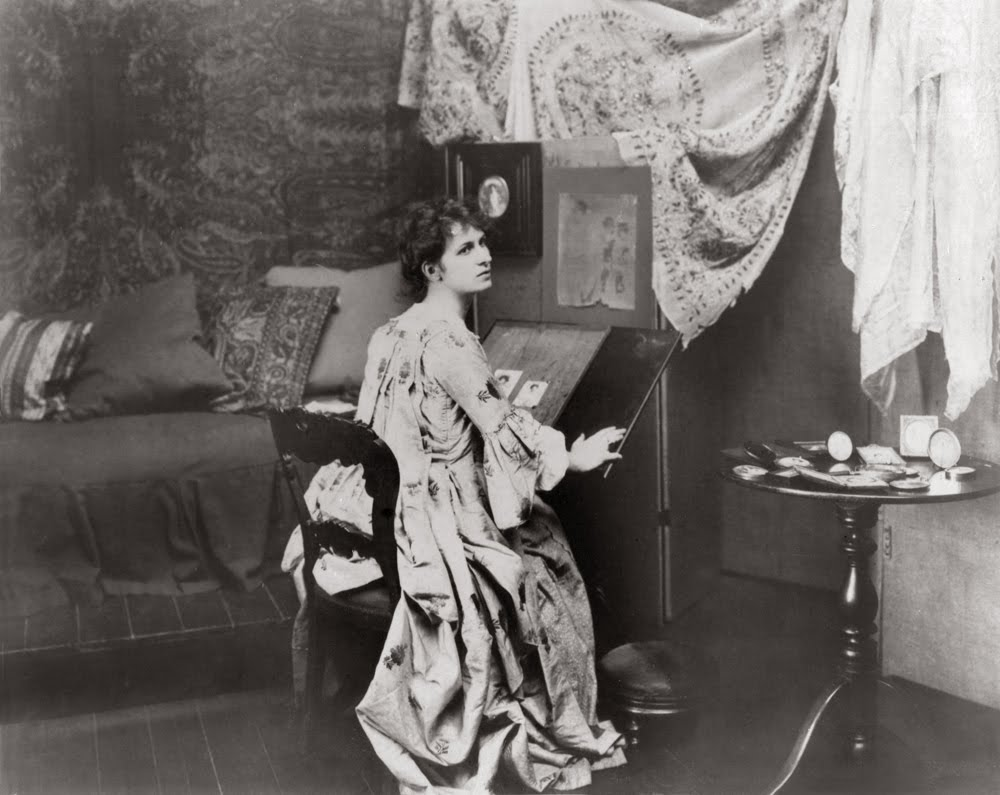
Eulabee Dix at her work table at her Carnegie Hall Towers studio, depicted in 1903 New York Times advertisement

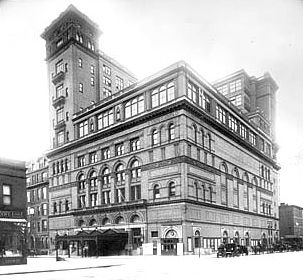
Carnegie Hall, 1899, showing added studio towers

== Gaining recognition ==
Even with a limited income, Dix made a conscious effort to dress fashionably, and held regular Friday afternoon gatherings at her home, where she showed off her work to potential buyers.

In 1904 Dix met Minnie Stevens Paget, a close friend of Edward VII, and wife of Arthur Paget, a high-ranking officer in the British Army, who later reached the rank of General, and was knighted. They became close friends, and it was to be near Paget that Dix began to divide her time between New York and London. When in London, she took up residence in an up-market residential hotel near Stanhope Gardens, in Kensington. Through her connection with Paget, Dix received commissions from many prominent figures, including the Holywood actress Ethel Barrymore, whom she painted in Philadelphia in around 1905, fashion designer Countess Fabricotti, as well as several from Paget herself.

Dix made a number of trips to Europe starting in In 1906, where she profited from greater access to historical miniatures and European paintings than was possible in America. She held her first exhibition, Exhibition of Portrait Miniature by Miss Eulabee Dix, at the Fine Art Society on London's New Bond Street, where she exhibited 24 works. That same year she also held shows at the Royal Academy of Arts in London, and the Walker Art Gallery in Liverpool.

In New York Dix had the opportunity to paint writer Samuel Langhorne Clemens, better known by his pseudonym Mark Twain. In 1908 she did the last painting of him from life.

== Dix as a subject ==
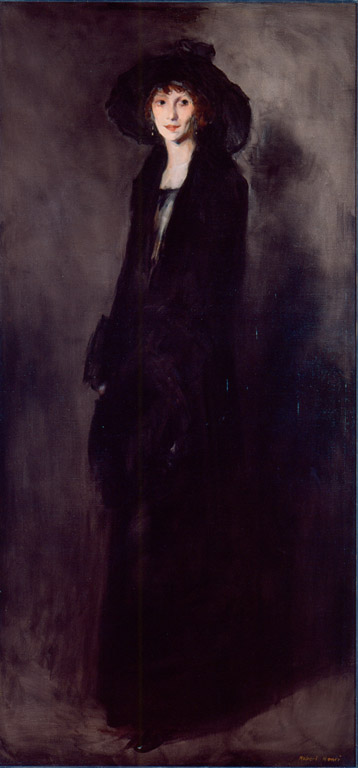
Robert Henri, Lady in Black Velvet. Portrait of Eulabee Dix, 1911

Dix herself was the subject of two portraits by renowned artist Robert Henri, to whom she was introduced in 1910 by prominent Irish artist John Butler Yeats. For one of these, she posed for a full-length portrait in her wedding dress. She was also photographed on at least four occasions by her friend Gertrude Kasebier.

== Marriage ==
On December 22, 1910, Dix married Alfred Leroy Becker, a New York lawyer, after a three-year engagement. The marriage produced two children, Philip and Joan.

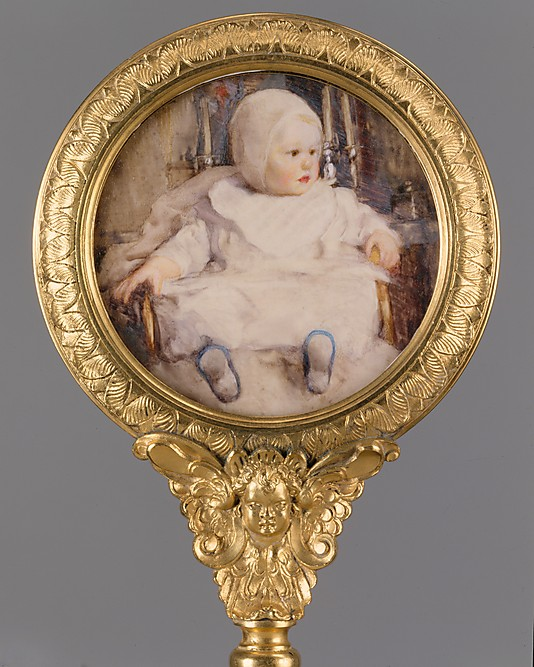
Eulabee Dix, Philip Dix Becker, 1912, watercolor on ivory, 3" in diameter, Metropolitan Museum of Art, New York

John Butler Yeats, referring to Eulabee Dix's strong personality, wrote to his daughter Lily the day after the wedding:

I once told her [Dix] I would not envy the man that she married, for she would be sure to devour him. She has a clinging way like ivy, which we know always kills the tree to which it attaches itself

The marriage ended in 1925, after 15 years. It had been a strained marriage, partly because both of them had pursued successful careers in their chosen field. The situation was made worse when Dix aborted a pregnancy against her husband's wishes. Becker ended the marriage by declaring his love for another woman.

== Changing fortunes ==
Following her divorce in 1925, Dix sailed with her children to France, and divided her time between Europe and New York. She won a medal at the Paris Salon in 1927, and also in New York and Philadelphia in 1929.

The stock market crash of 1929 and the resulting depression were to affect Dix's work, as many of her former clientele had seen their fortunes wiped out. Frustrated with her stagnant career, she became estranged from her son, Philip, who went to live with his father.

Dix moved to East 57th Street, where she lived for around seven years. Despite now living in a working-class neighbourhood, she continued to dress in extravagant outfits, always wearing a hat and carrying a cane. When miniaturism went out of favour in the 1930s, she gave lectures on the art of miniature painting. She also adapted her techniques, turning to floral still life paintings, and large oil works.

In 1937, with her daughter now married, Dix moved to Southern California, where at first she lived on a ranch near Santa Barbara. In an attempt to find emotional stability, she briefly joined a community of monks led by Ananda Ashrama, who preached religious tolerance and simple living. Despite her impatience, the experience reportedly had a calming effect on her.

== Declining years ==
During World War II Dix took a job with the Plas-Tex Corporation painting radium on airplane parts. During this time she suffered from exposure to radiation, which resulted in a small pension. Following this, she worked in a laundry, and joined the International Association of Machinists, drilling holes in airplane parts. She was justifiably proud of her part in contributing to the war effort, but her painting all but stopped. Despite this, she exhibited in the miniature division of the California Art Club.

Her last miniature portrait was of her granddaughter, Elizabeth Becker, started in January 1950, added to in April, 1950 at her 3d avenue studio in NYC and unfinished due to her failing eyesight. Her grandson was visiting during Easter break from Hingham, MA, and noted her difficulty in getting ".. good light" (her words) in the studio under the 3d ave EL. It remains in her archives at The American Museum of Women in the arts. Her grandson, Peter Becker, delivered it there spring 1998 from her daughter-in-law (Mildred P. Becker) holdings during the final distribution of Mrs. Becker's remaining art work holdings under her trust.

Her last portrait commission, in 1951, was from Kaufman Thuma Keller, who at the time was chairman of the board of the Chrysler Corporation. However deteriorating eyesight meant she was unable to finish the painting.

In 1956, aged 78, Dix sold her possessions and moved to Lisbon, Portugal where in 1958 an exhibition spanning her life's work was held at Museu Nacional de Arte Antiga. It was her last exhibition, and newspapers in New York and Portugal carried articles.

Her last portrait, a head and shoulders, thought to be of the wife of the American Ambassador to Portugal (1958), was done in Lisbon during this time. It is on loan to the Museum of Nebraska Art in Kearney, from her grandson, Peter Becker. Robert Henri's wedding dress portrait of Dix is also in The Museum of Nebraska Art's permanent collection.

Dix returned to the United States in 1961, moving in with her son and his wife in Woodbury, Connecticut. On June 14, 1961, the day before she was due to be moved to a care home, Eulabee Dix died. She was interred at Bellefontaine Cemetery in St. Louis.

== Legacy ==
Dix's work hangs in several institutions including the Metropolitan Museum of Art, New York; Museu Nacional de Arte Antiga, Lisbon; the National Museum of American Art, Washington DC; and the National Portrait Gallery, Washington, D.C. The Museum of Nebraska Art holds Robert Henri's wedding portrait of Dix as well as a dozen of her works.

The National Museum of Women in the Arts has in its permanent collection over 86 of her paintings. They also hold an archive of letters, journals and other manuscripts relating to Dix's life, as well as her palette and brush, her awards, and a pencil sketch by John Butler Yeats. The archive, known collectively as the Eulabee Dix Papers, was entrusted to the museum in 1989 by Joan Becker Gaines, Dix's daughter. The Museum held several exhibitions of her miniatures from April 11, 1991–April 11, 1992, from June 30, 1994–January 29, 1995, and from December 9, 1997–August 23, 1998.
