= Louise Willis Snead =

American artist, writer (1870–1958)

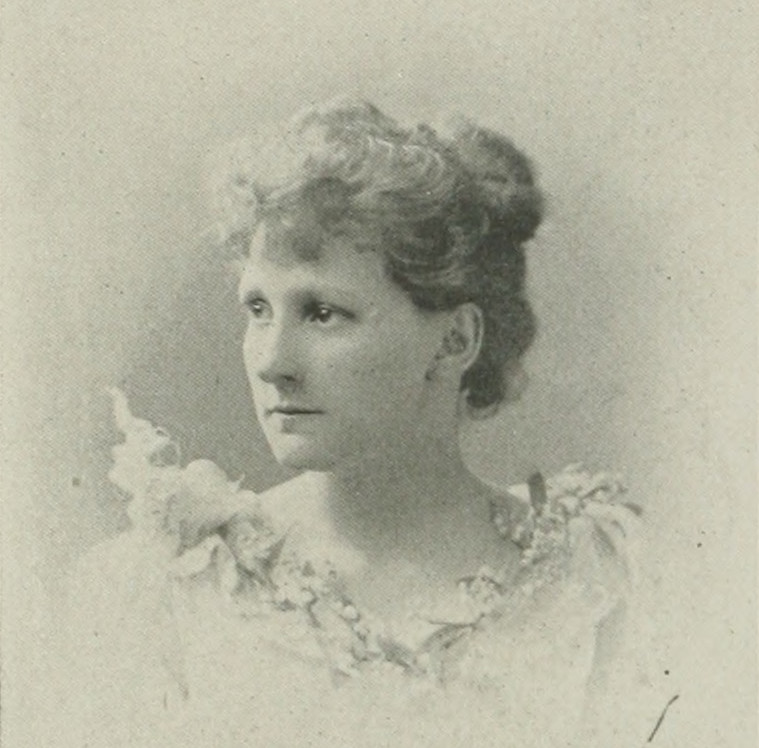
- Photo in A Woman of the Century
- Born: Louise Hammond Willis; December 14, 1868; Charleston, South Carolina, U.S.
- Died: October 7, 1958 (aged 89); Darien, Connecticut, U.S.
- Education: Charleston Female Seminary; Art Students League of New York; New York School of Art
- Occupations: artist; writer; composer
- Spouse: Harry Vairin Snead (m. 1894)
- Children: 1
- Writing career
- Pen name: Louis Hammond Willis
- Genres: miniature painting, illustrations, needlework
- Notable works: Silver and gold

Signature
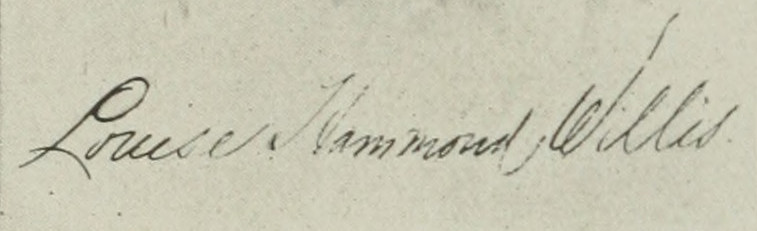

Louise Hammond Snead (née Willis; pen name: Louis Hammond Willis; December 14, 1868 – October 7, 1958) was an American artist, writer, and composer. Her art specialized in miniature painting, illustrations, and needlework. She lectured on Persian rugs, wrote articles of various topics under a masculine pseudonym, and even composed a march.

== Early life and education ==
Louise Hammond Willis was born in Charleston, South Carolina on December 14, 1868. (Note: According to the "Directory of Southern Women Artists", Louise was born in 1866.) From her mother, Elizabeth Louise Hammond, Louise inherited a love of nature and a scientific mind. From her father, Major Edward Willis, she inherited ambition, an indomitable will, and perseverance. The Willis home was the meeting place of people of talent and distinction.

She was graduated with first-honor medal and diploma from the Charleston Female Seminary. Her art studies were carried on in Charleston, under E. Whittock McDowell, and in New York City under James Carroll Beckwith and Harry Siddons Mowbray. She studied drawing, painting and modeling under William Merritt Chase, Frank DuMond, Irving Ramsey Wiles, and others at Art Students League of New York, New York School of Art and in European galleries, as well as being a pupil of Theodora Thayer and Alice Beckington. Snead also completed a post-graduate course in literature and languages.

== Career ==
While still a student, Snead had charge of the painting and drawing classes at Charleston Female Seminary. She was the assistant teacher in the Carolina Art School. Believing that everything helps everything else, she applied herself to the study of architecture, and in so doing, developed plans. While her specialty was portraiture, her illustrations and pen-and-ink drawings were meritorious, while she also excelled in the art of fine and artistic needle work, point-laces and art embroideries.

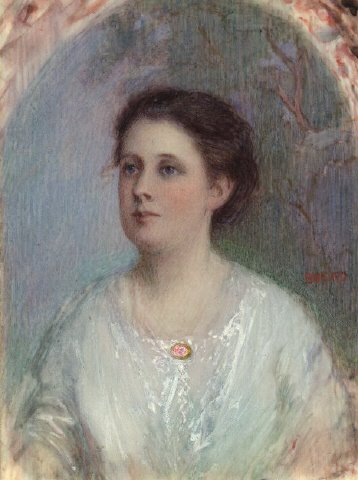
"Emma C Rose" a 1907 artwork by Louise Hammond Willis Snead

Snead exhibited for years in the New York Watercolor Society and at the American Society of Miniature Painters. She designed houseboats and model modern suburban homes for ten years. She received Honorable mention at the South Carolina Inter-State and West Indian Exposition, 1902.

Snead lectured on “The Magic Carpet," or the making of real Persian rugs. Other lectures were on topics of special interest to women's clubs, one being point laces. She illustrated a series of articles on the subject of point-lace making for Chautauqua Magazine. Snead copied many antique embroideries from museums, in the line of art needlework. She was interested in handicrafts, weaving, hammered brass, illuminated leather, tapestry and in all lines of interior decoration.

Snead was familiar with a half-dozen languages. She wrote both prose and poetry for magazines, her writings appeared over the pen name "Louis Hammond Willis." Snead contributed largely to women's magazines for fifteen years, and illustrated her own articles. She also played on a number of musical instruments. Having studied the theory of music, her compositions demonstrated originality. Snead composed approximately 20 songs and a march that was orchestrated by Victor Herbert and played by Patrick Gilmore's Band.

== Personal life ==
Snead made her home at 1 Wilson Avenue, Murray Hill, Flushing, Long Island, New York. She was a member of Daughters of the American Revolution, and the Pennsylvania Society of Miniature Painters. By religion, she was Protestant. Her recreations included landscape gardening, building stone pillars and walls, and making concrete garden furniture.

On September 4, 1894, she married Harry Vairin Snead (1867–deceased) of New York City, son of Col. Thomas L. Snead of Virginia. They had one daughter, Louise Vairin Snead (1897-1984).

Louise Willis Snead died in Darien, Connecticut, October 7, 1958.

== Selected works ==
- Silver and gold, 1916
