= Mrs. Beckington (Alice Beckington) =

1913 painting by Alice Beckington

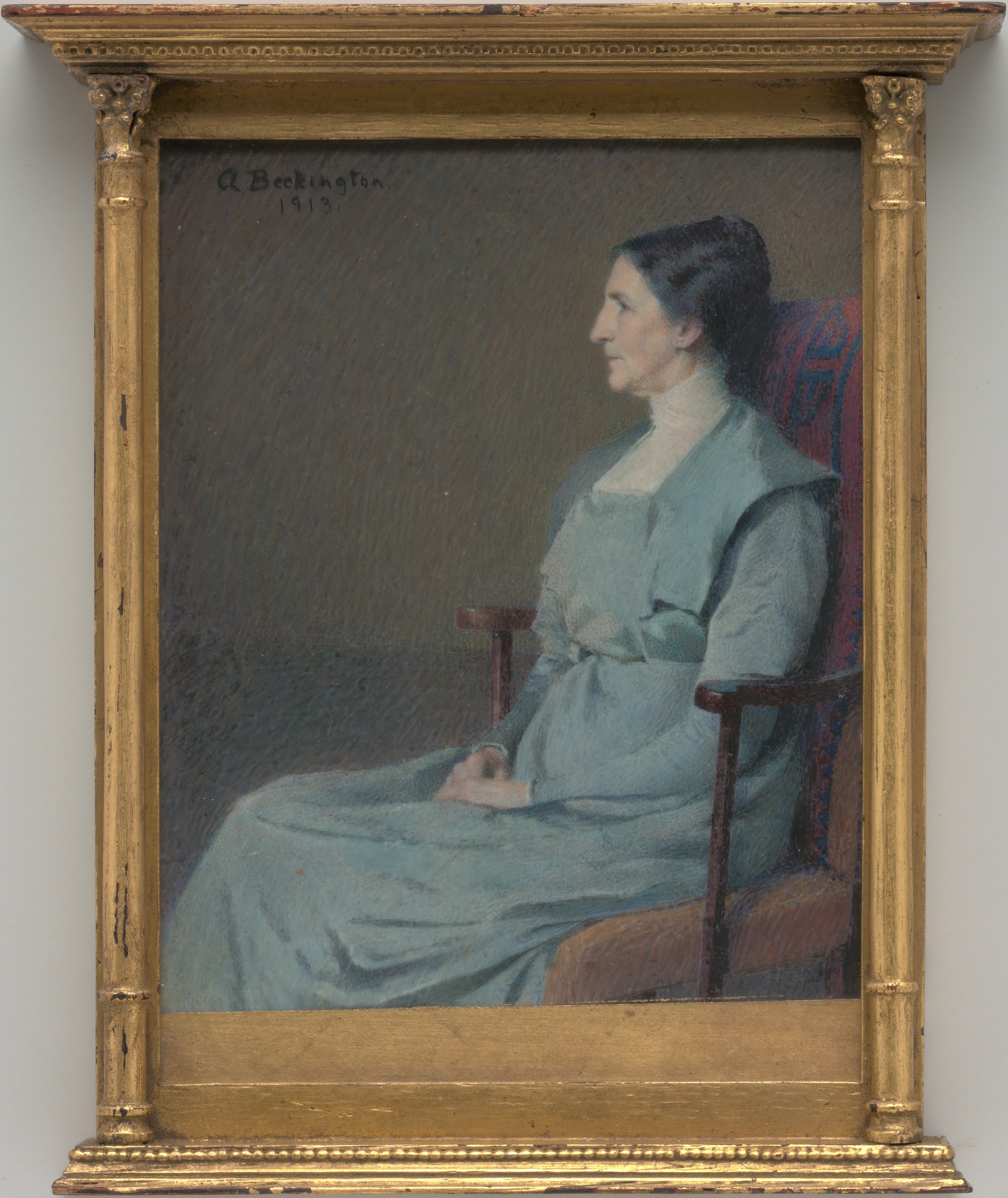
- Artist: Alice Beckington
- Year: 1913
- Dimensions: 15.2 cm (6.0 in) × 11.4 cm (4.5 in)
- Location: Metropolitan Museum of Art
- Accession no.: 14.57.2
- Identifiers: The Met object ID: 10129

Mrs. Beckington is a 1913 miniature painting in watercolour on ivory by Alice Beckington. It is in the collection of the Metropolitan Museum of Art in New York.

== Early history and creation ==
The miniature painting was acquired by the Metropolitan Museum of Art in 1914. The painting was part of the Pennsylvania Academy of the Fine Arts and Pennsylvania Society of Miniature Painters' 12th annual exhibition.

== Description and interpretation ==
The work depicts Alice Beckington's mother. The artist signed the painting on the front top left.

== Influence ==
The painting was influenced by Arrangement in Grey and Black No. 1 (1871) by James Abbott McNeill Whistler.
