= Manfred L. Keiler =

German-born American painter (1908–1960)

- Born: 1908; Berlin, Germany
- Died: 1960 (aged 51–52); Lincoln, Nebraska, U.S.
- Occupations: Art educator, painter

Manfred L. Keiler (1908-1960) was a German-born American painter, art educator and author. He was a professor of Art at the University of Nebraska–Lincoln from 1950 to 1960. His work can be seen at the Museum of Nebraska Art.

== Selected works ==
- Keiler, Manfred L. (1951). Art in the Schoolroom. Lincoln, Nebraska: University of Nebraska Press. OCLC 683426.
- Keiler, Manfred L. (1961). The Art in Teaching Art. Lincoln, Nebraska: University of Nebraska Press. OCLC 528152.
