= Alice Beckington =

American painter

- Born: July 30, 1868; St. Charles, Missouri
- Died: January 4, 1942 (aged 73)
- Occupation: Artist

Alice Beckington (July 30, 1868 – January 4, 1942) was an American painter.

Born in St. Charles, Missouri, Beckington studied art at the Art Students League of New York, where she was a pupil of J. Carroll Beckwith; she also studied for a month with Kenyon Cox. She next traveled to Paris for study at the Académie Julian, where her instructors included Jules Joseph Lefebvre and Jean-Joseph Benjamin-Constant, and taking lessons with Charles Lasar at his studio. She had exhibitions at Paris Salons and Paris Expositions through 1900, including the Salon du Champ de Mars. Upon returning to the United States, Beckington began exhibiting work in venues including the Pan-American Exposition, where she received an honorable mention, Louisiana Purchase Exposition, where she received a bronze medal, and Poland Spring Exhibition.

She was a founder member of the American Society of Miniature Painters, of which organization she served as president for a number of years, and from 1905 to 1916 she taught miniature painting at the Art Students League. She was also a member, during her career, of the American Federation of Arts and the Pennsylvania Society of Miniature Painters. Beckington was among the women artists, including Theodora W. Thayer, Thomas Meteyard, sisters Matilda Lewis and Josephine Lewis, and Mabel Stewart who began summering at Scituate, Massachusetts around the turn of the century, founding a small artistic colony. During this time she also spent time with notable feminist author Inez Haynes Irwin, and she and Thayer both painted portraits of Irwin that were exhibited in the Knoedler Gallery. In 1935, she was awarded the medal of honor by the Brooklyn Society of Miniature Painters.

A portrait by Beckington of her pupil Rosina Cox Boardman is currently in the collection of the Smithsonian American Art Museum. Three portraits, including one of her mother, are owned by the Metropolitan Museum of Art.

== Gallery ==
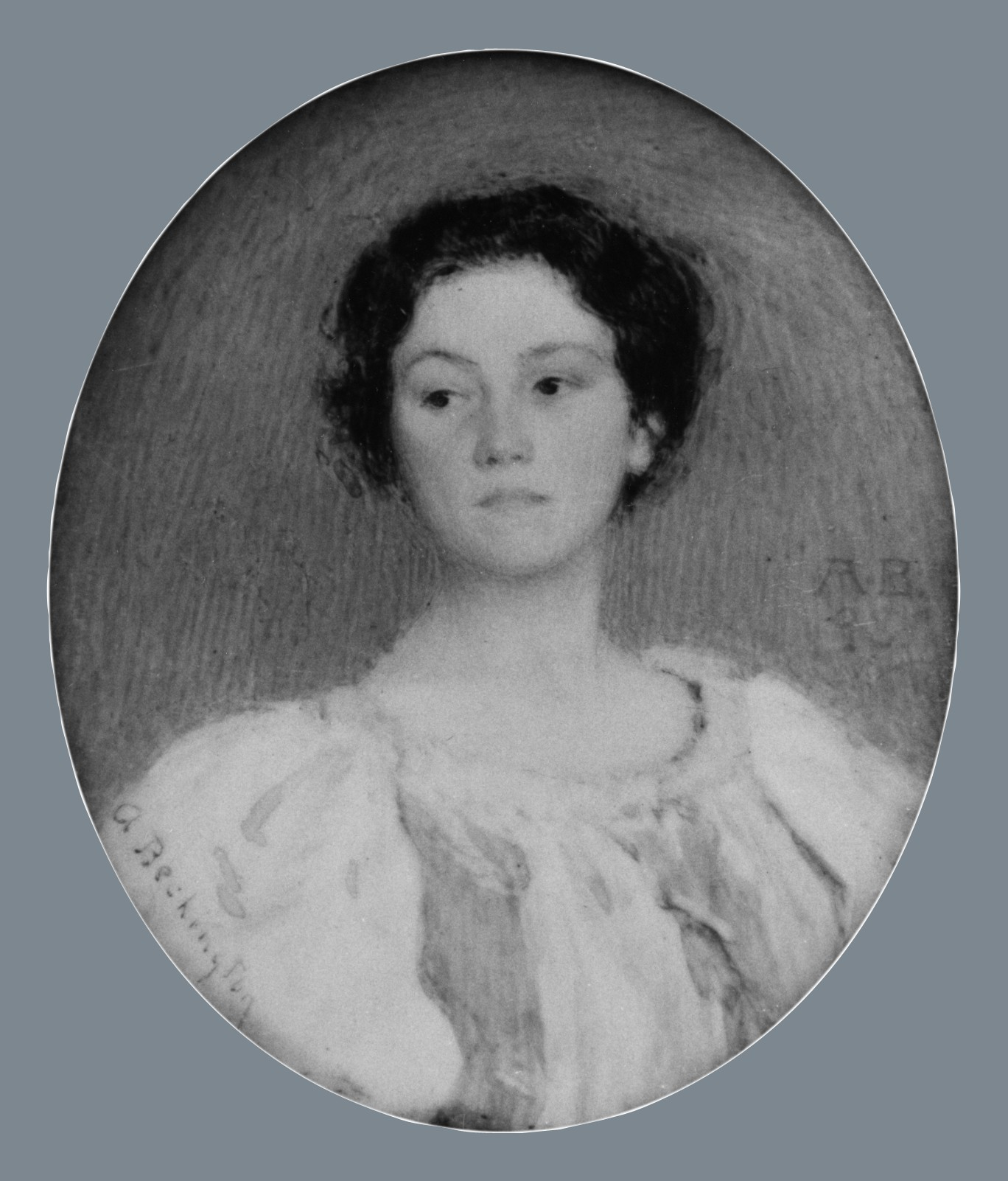
Portrait of Miss T., 1898

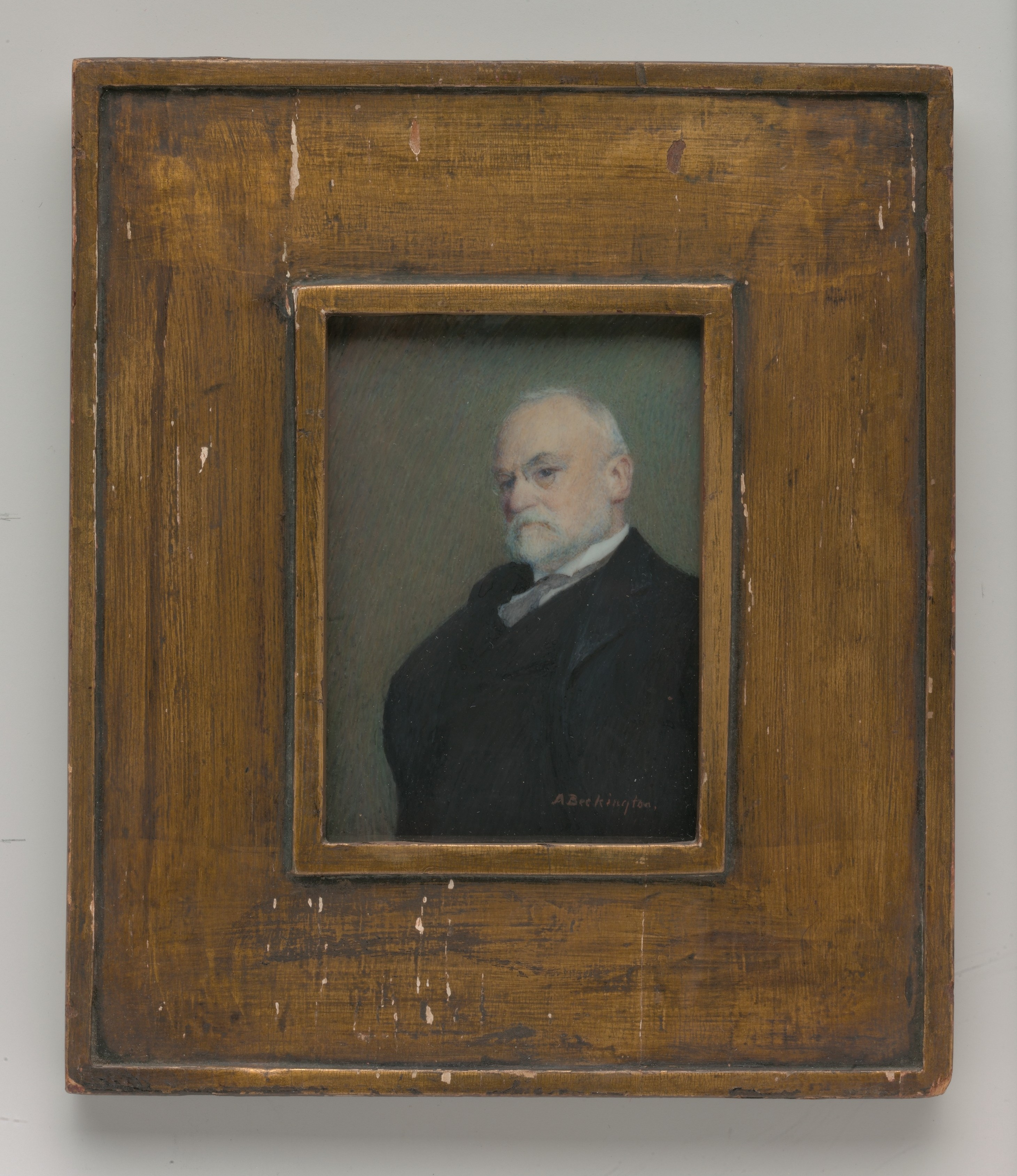
Portrait of Richard Vaughn Lewis. c. 1910

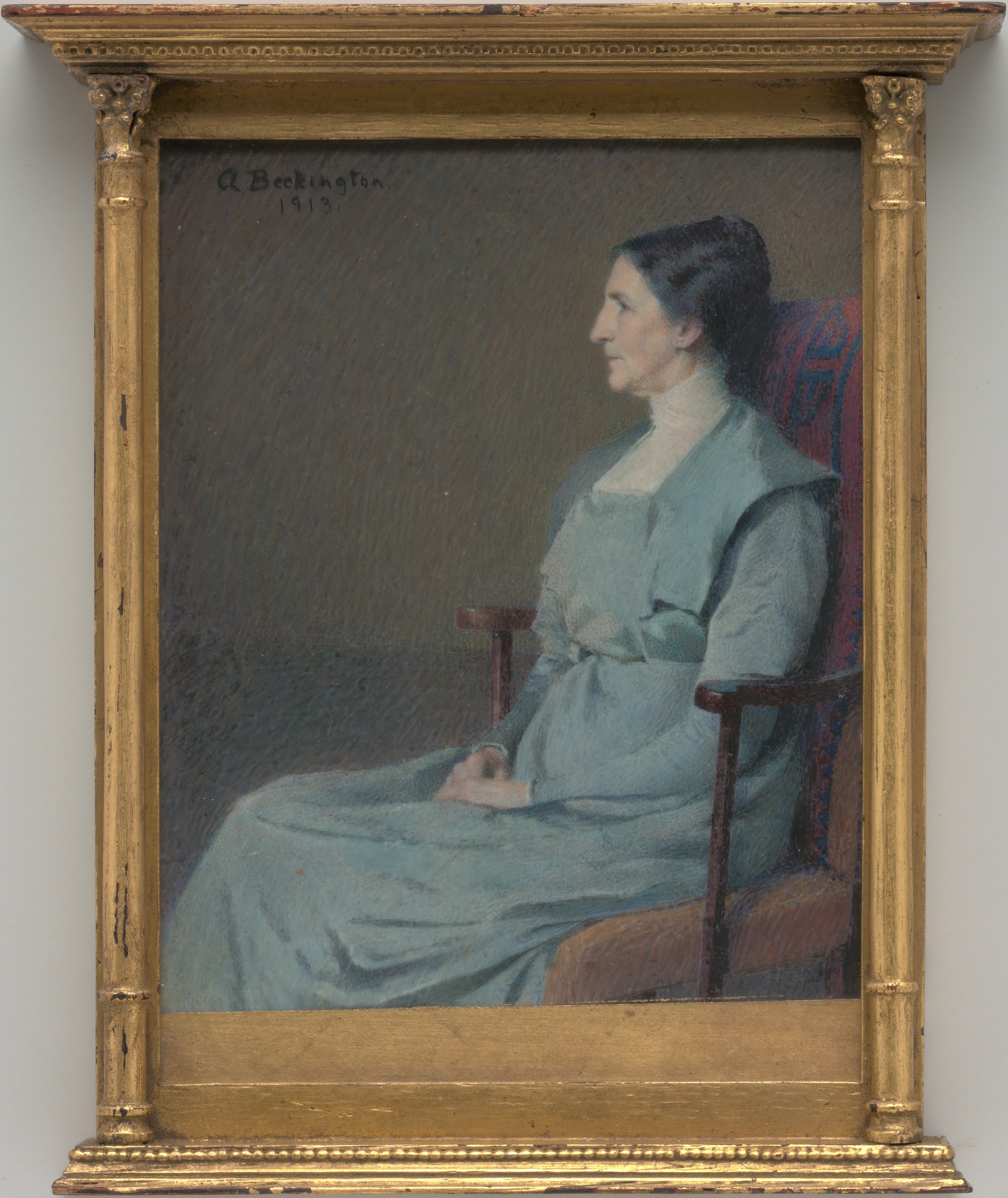
Portrait of Mrs. Beckington (the artist's mother), 1913
