= Alice Cleaver =

Alice Cleaver may refer to:

- Alice Cleaver (nursemaid), nursemaid of Titanic survivor Trevor Allison, subject of much dispute
- Alice E. Cleaver, American artist
