= Julie Kahle =

American painter

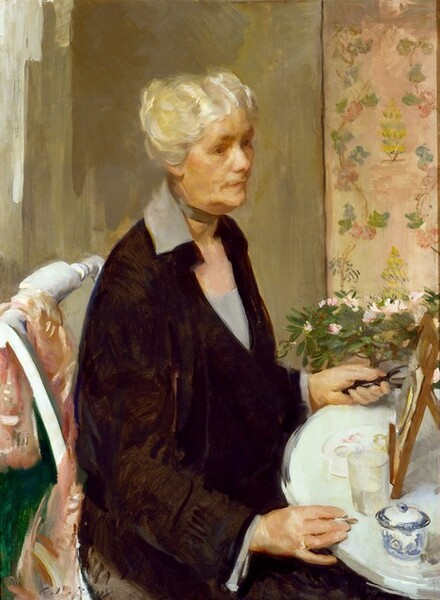
- portrait by Cecilia Beaux
- Born: January 30, 1858; St. Peter
- Died: April 7, 1931 (aged 73); Bridgehampton
- Occupation: Painter

Julie Bruhns Kahle (January 30, 1858 – April 7, 1931) was an American miniature painter.

Julie Bruhns was the child of German immigrants. She married German-born Marcel Kahle, a wealthy importer, and they had seven children.

Julie Kahle began painting miniatures when nearing the age of sixty and studied at the American School of Miniature Painting in New York City. She was a member of the American Society of Miniature Painters and the National Association of Women Painters and Sculptors. One of her miniatures, The Girl with the White Fur, is in the collection of the Metropolitan Museum of Art.

Her son Herman Kahle was a student of portraitist Cecilia Beaux and he commissioned Beaux to paint her mother's portrait. Julie Kahle's granddaughter donated the portrait to the Corcoran Gallery of Art and it is now in the collection of the National Gallery of Art.
