= Henry Clarence Pitz =

American artist and writer

Henry C. Pitz
- Born: Henry Clarence Pitz; June 16, 1895; Philadelphia, Pennsylvania
- Died: November 26, 1976 (aged 81); Philadelphia, Pennsylvania
- Known for: Illustration, painting

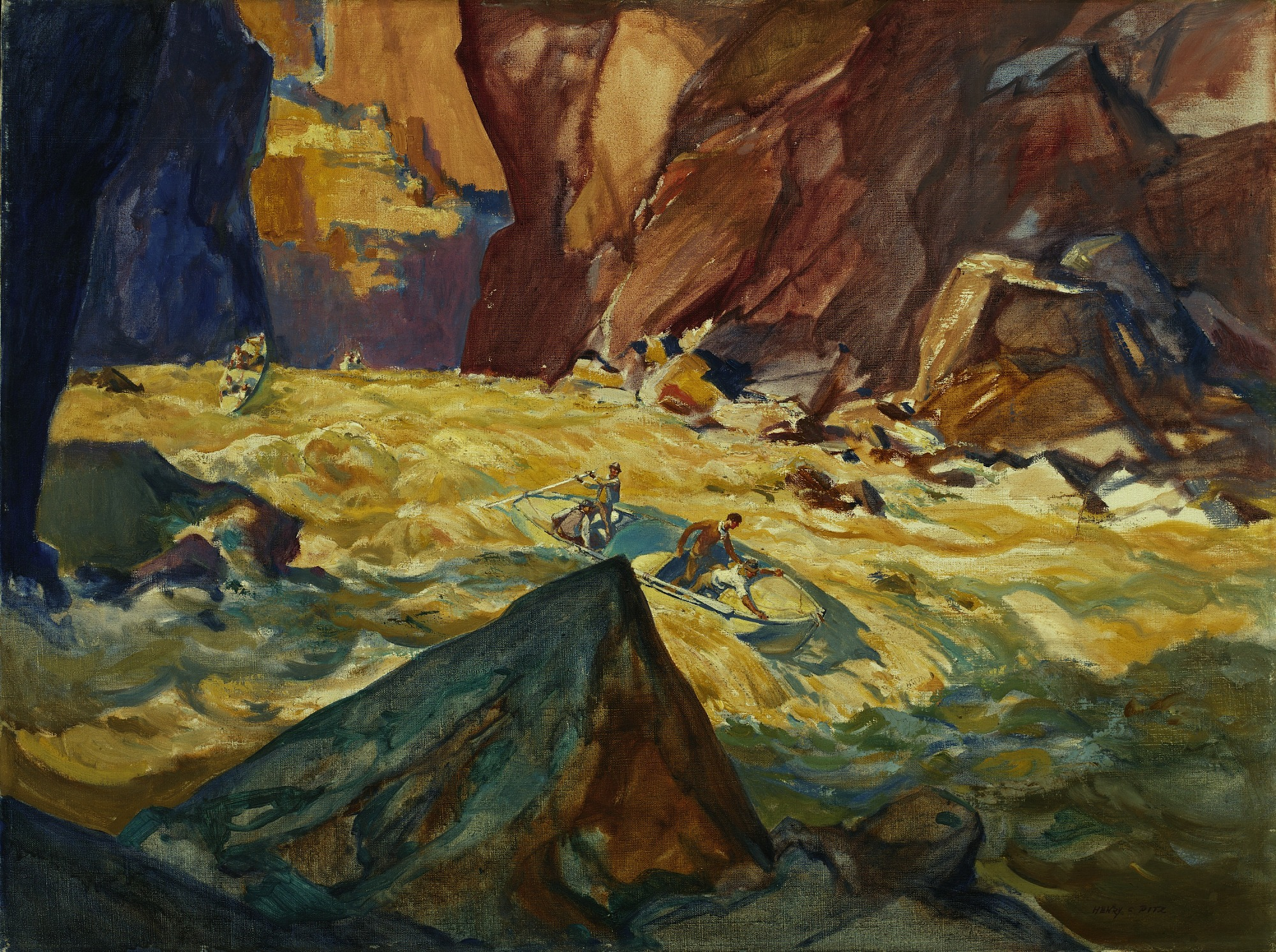
Major Powell Descends the Colorado River through the Grand Canyon, a painting by Henry C. Pitz commissioned for the Smithsonian exhibit at the Century of Progress exposition (1933–1934)

Henry Clarence Pitz (June 16, 1895 – November 26, 1976) was an American artist, illustrator, editor, author, and teacher who wrote and/or illustrated over 160 books, and dozens of magazine covers and articles. His most well-known book is The Brandywine Tradition (1968).

== Life and career ==
Pitz was born in Philadelphia in 1895. His father was a bookbinder who immigrated from Germany. Pitz graduated from West Philadelphia High School and was awarded a scholarship to the Philadelphia Museum School of Industrial Art (now a part of the University of the Arts). There Pitz studied illustration and became particularly fond of the work of Howard Pyle. One of Pitz's instructors at the Museum School was Thornton Oakley, who had been a student of Pyle.

He enlisted in the United States Army Medical Corps in 1917 and became an x-ray technician. He was assigned to Base Camp 56, Allerey, France, assisting Colonel Coates, the unit surgeon. After the war, he returned to Philadelphia. There he began a career of teaching and book illustration, his first notable book being Early American Costume, published by The Century Company of New York.

In 1935, Pitz married Mary "Molly" Wheeler Wood. They remained married until his death in 1976. In 1988, she wrote a short summary of his life, now available online.

In the 1930s, Pitz joined the monthly magazine American Artist as an associate editor and writer. He was a regular contributor to the magazine for the rest of his life. In 1950 Pitz was elected to the National Academy of Design.

In the 1960s, Pitz was commissioned by Houghton, Mifflin and Company to write The Brandywine Tradition, which remained on the best seller list for ten weeks. A few years later, in 1975, Pitz published a comprehensive book on his favorite illustrator, Howard Pyle.

Henry Clarence Pitz died at his home in Chestnut Hill, Philadelphia, on November 26, 1976, after working on a painting the day before.

== Partial bibliography ==
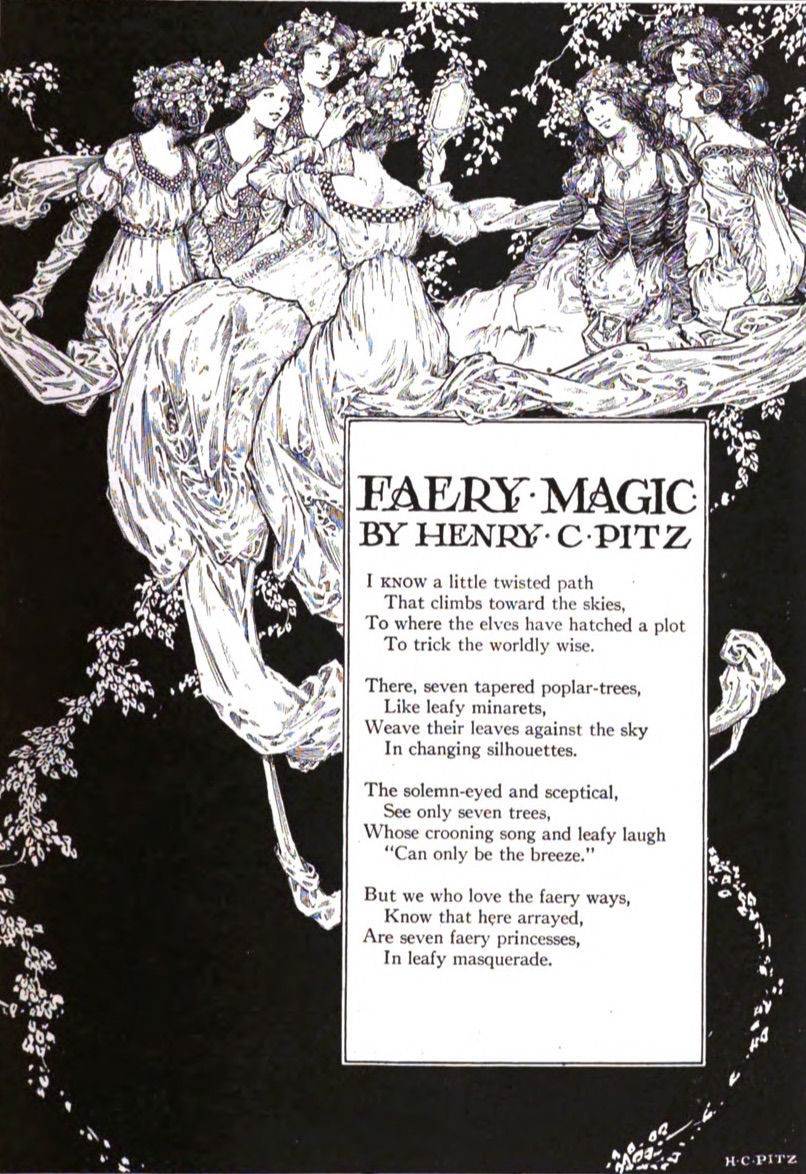
Faery Magic Illustration and poem in St. Nicholas magazine, June 1921

The following is a partial list of published works by Pitz:

- A Treasury of American Book Illustration (editor). New York: Watson-Guptill Publications, 1947. OCLC 459521213
- The Practice of Illustration New York, Watson-Guptill, 1947. OCLC 491120297
- Drawing Trees. New York: Watson-Guptill, 1956. Rev. and enlarged ed. How to Draw Trees. New York: Watson-Guptill, 1972 ISBN 978-0-823-01441-5
- Ink Drawing Techniques. New York, Watson-Guptill Publications, 1957. ISBN 978-0-823-02550-3
- Illustrating Children’s Books: History, Technique, Production. New York: Watson-Guptill, 1963. ISBN 978-0-82302-535-0
- Drawing Outdoors. New York: Watson-Guptill, 1965. ISBN 978-0-273-01155-2
- Early American Costume (with Edward Warwick). New York: Century, 1929. Revised edition Early American Dress: The Colonial and Revolutionary Periods (with Edward Warwick and Alexander Wyckoff). New York: Benjamin Blom, 1965. OCLC 607002650
- Howard Pyle: Writer, Illustrator, Founder of the Brandywine School. New York: Clarkson N. Potter, MCMLXV 1965. ISBN 978-0-517-51665-2
- The Brandywine Tradition. New York, Weathervane Books, 1968. ISBN 978-0-517-16431-0
- Charcoal Drawing. New York: Watson-Guptill, 1971. ISBN 978-0-823-00615-1
- 173 Drawings and Illustrations (with Frederic Remington). New York: Dover, 1972. ISBN 978-0-486-20714-8
- 200 Years of American Illustration. New York: Random House, 1977. ISBN 978-0-394-41474-4
