= Elsie Dodge Pattee =

American miniature painter

Elsie Dodge Pattee Augur
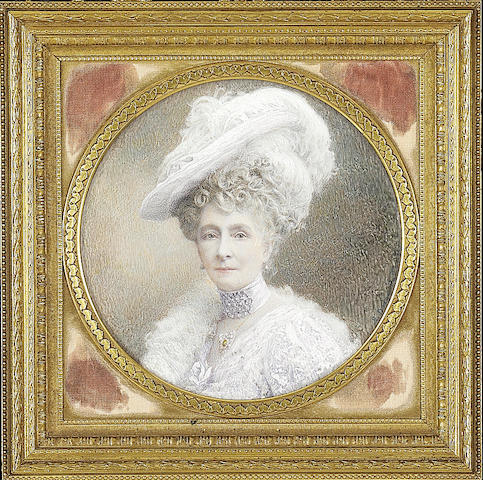
- Miniature portrait by Elsie Dodge Pattee
- Born: Elsie Dodge; September 4, 1876; Chelsea, Massachusetts, U.S.
- Died: 1975 (aged 97–98); Old Lyme, Connecticut, U.S.

Elsie Dodge Pattee Augur (1876–1975) was an American miniature painter.

== Early life ==
She was the daughter of David L. Dodge and Emma H. Dodge; her parents were wealthy from their business in dry goods. In her youth she studied in London and Dresden. While in London, she married Elmer Ellsworth Pattee in 1900.

She studied at the Académie Julian in Paris. She stayed in France for twenty years, returning to the United States in 1912. Her first husband Elmer Ellsworth Pattee died in 1925 in France, while Pattee was in New York. Her second husband was Charles E. Augur.

== Art career ==
Dodge was a member of the American Society of Miniature Painters. She illustrated children's books, including Christmas, The Animal Book by William Allen Butler. In 1915 she received a medal at the Panama-Pacific Exposition.

One of her students was painter Virginia Hendrickson Irvin.

Her work is included in the collections of the Smithsonian American Art Museum, the Metropolitan Museum of Art, the Brooklyn Museum, and the Philadelphia Museum of Art.
