= Virginia Hendrickson Irvin =

American painter (1904–1992)

- Born: Virginia Gray Hendrickson; October 9, 1904; Chicago, Illinois, U.S.
- Died: January 6, 1992 (aged 87); Ypsilanti, Michigan, U.S.
- Burial place: Saint Thomas Catholic Cemetery
- Other name: Virginia H. Irvin
- Education: School of the Art Institute of Chicago
- Occupation: Painter
- Spouse: Charles E. Irvin
- Children: 1

Virginia Hendrickson Irvin (née Virginia Gray Hendrickson; October 9, 1904 – January 6, 1992) was an American painter. She was known for her miniature paintings.

== Life and career ==
Virginia Hendrickson Irvin was born as Virginia Gray Hendrickson on October 9, 1904, in Chicago, Illinois. Her parents were Edith (née Gray) and Forman Hendrickson. Her father died when she was young and the family moved from Chicago to Ann Arbor to be closer to her maternal grandparents. Irvin took an interest to making art in childhood. She graduated in 1921 from Ann Arbor High School (now Pioneer High School) in Michigan.

Irvin studied at the School of the Art Institute of Chicago. One of her teachers was miniature painter Elsie Dodge Pattee.

Irvin was a member of the American Society of Miniature Painters. Her work is in museum collections, include at the Smithsonian American Art Museum in Washington, D.C., and the Metropolitan Museum of Art in New York City.

== Personal life and death ==
In 1924, she married Charles Edgar Irvin (1898–1956). They had one son. She was a long time resident of Ann Arbor, Michigan.

In her late life she lived in a nursing home in Ypsilanti, Michigan. She died on January 6, 1992, in Ypsilanti.
