= Sarah Visanska =

- Born: Sarah Fredericka Bentschner; July 16, 1870; Charleston, South Carolina
- Died: February 28, 1926 (aged 55)
- Occupation: Social Organizer
- Spouse: Julius Marion Visanska (m. 1895)

Sarah Visanska (July 16, 1870 – February 28, 1926) was an American clubwoman, president of the South Carolina Federation of Women's Clubs from 1910 to 1912.

== Early life and education ==
Sarah Fredericka Bentschner was born in Charleston, South Carolina, in 1870, the daughter of David and Hannah Jacobi Bentschner. Her German-born father owned a men's clothing store. She graduated from Charleston Female Seminary in 1889.

== Club work ==
Sarah Visanska was the founder and first president of the Charleston section of the National Council of Jewish Women. She spent six years as president of the Charleston Civic Club and two years as president of the South Carolina Federation of Women's Clubs. From these and other posts in women-run organizations, she was active in advocating for women's suffrage in South Carolina and for issues such as early childhood education. She was also a member of the Ladies' Hebrew Benevolent Society, the Society for the Study and Prevention of Tuberculosis, the Charleston Female Seminary Alumnae Association, the Charleston Guild of Arts and Crafts, and the Roper Hospital Auxiliary. She was one of South Carolina's delegates to the National Meeting of the General Federation of Women's Clubs in St. Louis in 1904.

While she was president of the Kelly Kindergarten Association, the first free kindergarten in the American South opened in Charleston. She was also active in the establishment of the first public playground in South Carolina.

During World War I, she organized Charleston's Women's Division of the Red Cross and the Community Club for Enlisted Men and worked especially on wartime food conservation efforts.

== Personal life ==
Sarah Bentschner married businessman Julius Marion Visanska in 1895. He bought a lot of land in 1919, and in 1920, they built a new house on East Battery Street in Charleston on land historically associated with Fort Mechanic. She died in 1926, at age 55; her remains were interred at the Kahal Kadosh Beth Elohim Cemetery in Charleston, the oldest Jewish cemetery in the American South.

Visanska was posthumously elected to the Charleston Federation of Women's Clubs Hall of Fame. The 1920 Julius M. Visanska House is a historic yellow brick mansion on East Battery Street in Charleston.
