= Frank Armstrong Crawford Vanderbilt =

American socialite and philanthropist (1839–1885)

Frank Armstrong Crawford-Vanderbilt
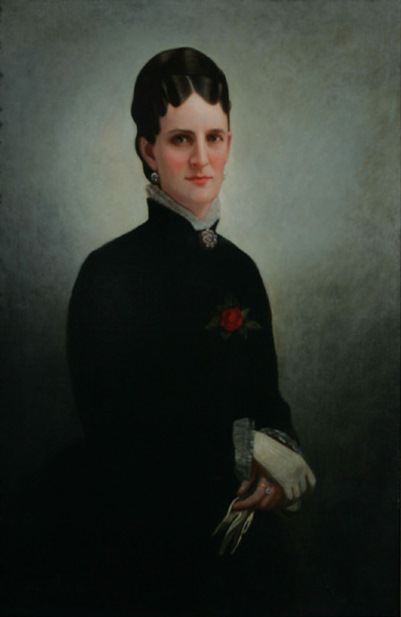
- Portrait by William J. Whittemore
- Born: Frank Armstrong Crawford; January 18, 1839; Mobile, Alabama, U.S.
- Died: May 4, 1885 (aged 46); Staten Island, New York, U.S.
- Burial place: Vanderbilt Family Mausoleum, New York, U.S.
- Occupation: Philanthropist
- Spouse: Cornelius Vanderbilt (m. 1869; died 1877)

Frank Armstrong Crawford Vanderbilt (January 18, 1839 – May 4, 1885) was an American socialite and philanthropist. During the American Civil War, she was a strong supporter of the Confederate States of America. After the war, she lived in New York City and married multi-millionaire Cornelius Vanderbilt.

== Early life ==
Frank Armstrong Crawford was born on January 18, 1839, in Mobile, Alabama, to Robert Leighton Crawford and Martha Eliza Everett. Her parents named her after their best friend, Frank Armstrong, before she was born, not knowing she would be female. Growing up in Mobile, she attended St. Francis Street Methodist Church.

During the American Civil War of 1861–1865, she was "an unrepentant Confederate." After the war, she moved to New York City with her mother. Augusta Jane Evans described her as a "zealous Methodist."

== Philanthropy ==
In 1873 Crawford persuaded her husband, Cornelius Vanderbilt, to give $1 million to Bishop Holland Nimmons McTyeire, the husband of her cousin, Amelia Townsend, to found Vanderbilt University in Nashville, Tennessee. Cornelius saw this gift as a sign of reconciliation to the South, after he had helped defeat the Confederate States Army with his USS Vanderbilt during the Civil War. However, he never visited the university.

== Personal life ==
Crawford was briefly married to John Elliott, but quickly divorced. In 1869, she married Cornelius Vanderbilt after the death of his first wife, Sophia Johnson (a mutual cousin). He died in 1877, and was her mother's cousin. She signed a pre-nuptial agreement, agreeing to receive $500,000 in bonds after his death, a great sum at the time but a fraction of Vanderbilt's fortune. Confederate General Braxton Bragg and his brother, Confederate Attorney General Thomas Bragg, both attended the wedding.

== Death and legacy ==
She died on May 4, 1885, in Staten Island. Her funeral was conducted by Charles Deems in the Church of the Strangers, a church for Southerners in New York that she attended regularly.

Her portrait, painted by William J. Whittemore in 1906, was donated by her brother Robert Leighton Crawford Jr. to Vanderbilt University; it is in Kirkland Hall.

Crawford Hall, one of the ten houses on the Martha Rivers Ingram Commons at Vanderbilt University, was named in her honor. An article in the Vanderbilt Political Review about the university's links to slavery notes, "During our research, for example, it was shockingly difficult to find information on Frank Armstrong Crawford’s stance on the Civil War on the Vanderbilt website or in Vanderbilt archives, yet other sources plainly cited her dedication to the Confederate cause."
