= Glenora Richards =

American painter

- Born: Glenora Case; February 18, 1909; New London, Ohio, United States
- Died: October 21, 2009 (aged 100); Fitchburg, Massachusetts, United States
- Known for: Portrait miniatures Postage stamp design
- Spouse: Walter DuBois Richards
- Awards: Medal of Honor, National Association of Women Artists; 1953; National Association of Women Artists Prize; 1962

Glenora Richards (February 18, 1909 – October 21, 2009) was an American miniature painter and designer of postage stamps. The collector Lewis Rabbage called her the "greatest miniature painter of her time, and perhaps ever."

== Early life, education, and family ==
Glenora Case was born in 1909 in New London, Ohio. Her parents were Bertha and Tracy Case.

She attended high school in Litchfield, Ohio, where she played the violin. She studied art at the Cleveland Institute of Art (CIA) in the 1920s. She met her future husband, Walter DuBois Richards, also a student at the CIA, while she was sketching at a department store. The couple married and moved to New York City.

In 1941, the family moved to New Canaan, Connecticut, where she lived until just before her death in 2009. She had two children.

Walter Richards died in 2006 and Glenora Richards died in 2009 at a nursing home in Fitchburg, Massachusetts. She continued to paint and upon her death, she was the last surviving member of the American Society of Miniature Painters.

== Work and recognition ==
Richards painted miniature portraits and designed postage stamps. In 1953, she was awarded the medal of honor by the National Association of Women Artists. Timothy, a miniature portrait of her adolescent son, was awarded The National Association of Women Artists Prize at the organization's 1962 Annual Exhibition.

Her miniature portrait of the prize-winning poet Edna St. Vincent Millay was the basis for a U.S. postage stamp, issued in 1981. She also designed a postage stamp to commemorate Dr. Mary Edwards Walker, a U.S. Army surgeon who was the first woman to be awarded the Congressional Medal of Honor.

== Works in public collections ==
- Tim Richards as a Baby, 1943, watercolor on ivory, Yale University Art Gallery
- Portrait of Henry Tracy Richards, mid-20th century, watercolor on ivory substitute, Philadelphia Museum of Art
- Henry Tracy Richards, ca. 1955, watercolor on ivory, Smithsonian American Art Museum
