= Thornton Oakley =

American painter (1881–1953)

- Thornton Oakley, circa 1920
- Born: March 27, 1881; Pittsburgh, Pennsylvania, US
- Died: April 4, 1953 (aged 72); Bryn Mawr, Pennsylvania, US
- Education: University of Pennsylvania
- Style: Brandywine School
- Spouse: Amy Ewing Oakley

Thornton Oakley (March 27, 1881 – April 4, 1953) was an American artist and illustrator.

== Biography ==
Thornton Oakley was born on Sunday, March 27, 1881, in Pittsburgh. He was the son of John Milton Oakley and Imogen Brashear Oakley. He graduated from Shady Side Academy in 1897, and studied at the University of Pennsylvania, receiving B.S. and M.S. degrees in architecture in 1901 and 1902.

Oakley began his study of illustration with Howard Pyle in 1902, working with him for three years, both at Pyle's winter studio on North Franklin St. in Wilmington, Delaware, and at his summer studio in Chadds Ford, Pennsylvania, which was situated in the old mill that now houses the Brandywine River Museum. Almost half a century later, Oakley described his first day with Pyle in an address he delivered at the Free Library of Philadelphia, on the occasion of which he also presented his collection of Pyleana – drawings, prints, books and other items, including letters and sketchbooks – to the Free Library:

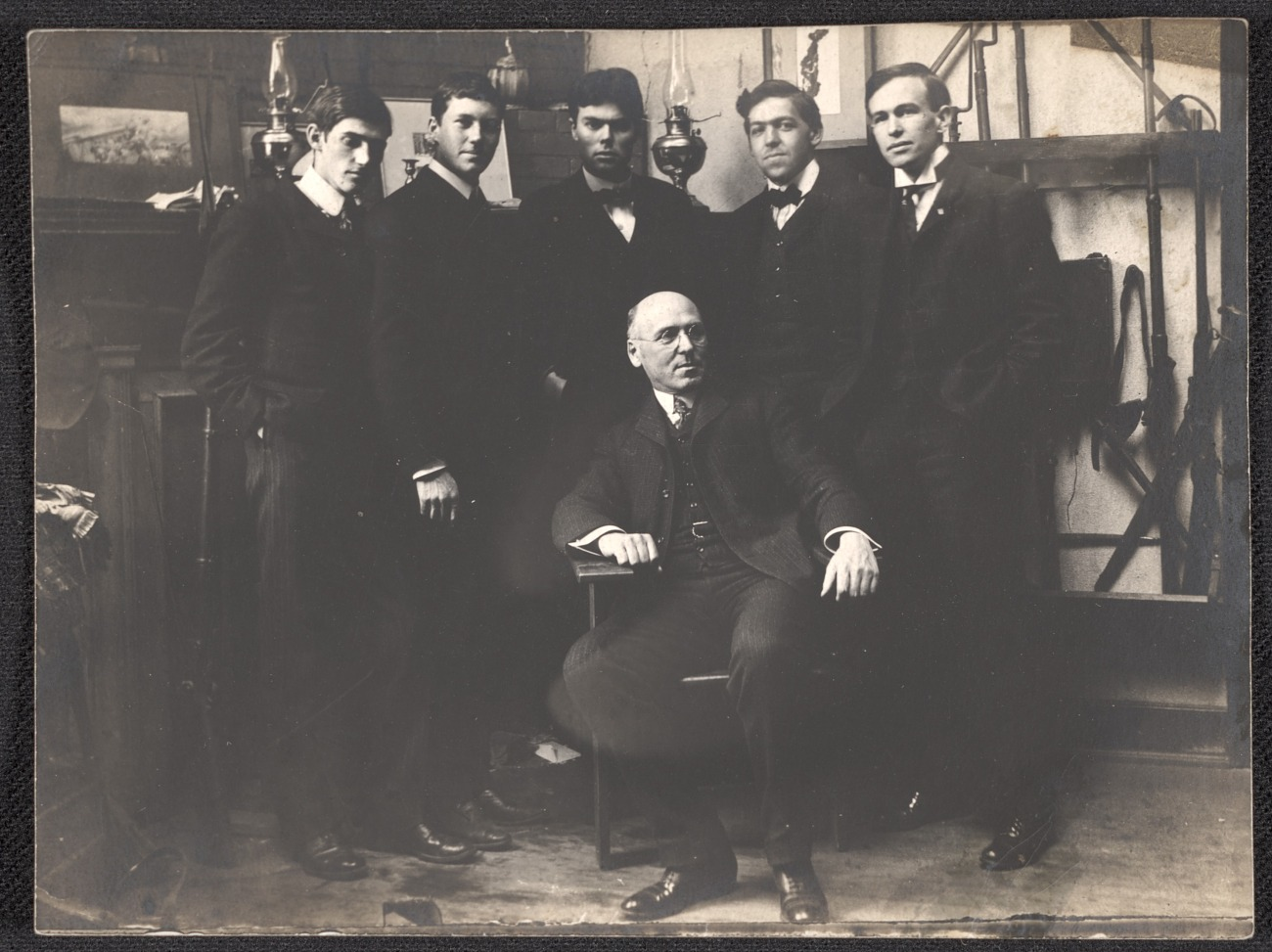
Howard Pyle and his students, circa 1903. Seated: Howard Pyle. Standing, left to right: George Harding, Gordon McCouch, Thornton Oakley, N.C. Wyeth, Allen Tupper True. From the Howard Pyle Collection, Delaware Art Museum

There we four – my new cronies – Allen Tupper True, George Harding, Gordon McCouch and I – made our first sketches from a model, and our efforts were frightful to behold! Not one of us had had a palette in our hands ever before: I had not the least idea as to procedure. My attempts were terrifying to behold, and when H.P. came to me to criticize my work he paused for a long, long time before speaking, and I know that he must have been appalled. He finally said "Well, Oakley, either you are color blind or you are a genius." And I am still wondering which it is!

Commenting about Pyle's evaluation of Oakley, author and illustrator Henry C. Pitz opined, "As time and practice revealed to Pyle, neither guess was wholly correct. Thornton Oakley never learned the nuances of color but had an ingrained predilection for the primaries, red, yellow and blue."

In March 1910, Thornton Oakley married Amy Ewing (1882–1963) of Philadelphia. Their daughter Lansdale Oakley became a frequent companion on their many trips abroad, during which Amy gathered material for her travel books, all of which were illustrated by Thornton (see Book Illustrations below).

Oakley became an illustrator and writer for periodicals, including Century, Collier's, Harper's Monthly and Scribner's. In the years 1914–1919 and 1921–1936 he was in charge of the Department of Illustration at the Philadelphia Museum School of Industrial Art. In 1914–1915 he also taught drawing at the University of Pennsylvania, and gave lectures at the Art Institute of Chicago, the Metropolitan Museum of Art, and the Curtis Institute. He was a member of the jury of selection and advisory committee of the Department of Fine Arts at the Panama–Pacific International Exposition in San Francisco in 1915 and the Philadelphia Sesquicentennial Exposition in 1926.

During World War I, lithographs of his patriotic drawings of war work at the shipyard at Hog Island, Philadelphia were distributed by the United States government. In 1938–1939 he did six 12-foot mural panels for the Franklin Institute in Philadelphia on epochs in science. During World War II he did three sets of pictures of the war effort for National Geographic Magazine in 1942, 1943, and 1945. After the war he was commissioned to paint industrial subjects for the Pennsylvania Railroad, the Philadelphia Electric Company, Sun Oil, and other industries.

Oakley was deeply influenced by Howard Pyle's philosophy of illustration. In the 1951 address he delivered at the Free Library of Philadelphia, referred to above, he said, "We never heard one word from our beloved teacher concerning tools and methods. His utterances were only of the spirit, thought, philosophy, ideals, vision, purpose." Years earlier, in 1923, Oakley presided at the private viewing of the Howard Pyle Memorial Exhibition at the Philadelphia Art Alliance where reminiscences of Pyle were given by Elizabeth Green Elliott, Jessie Willcox Smith, George Harding, and Frank Schoonover. In praising Pyle, Oakley said,

Illustration is the highest type of pictorial art. ... Because illustration is simply a pictorial MAKING CLEAR, and if a picture makes clear a message in a big way, it is an illustration, whether it be made for magazine, book, mural decoration, or exhibition. ... Among those pictorial artists who have been definitely connected with making clear statements, pre-eminently stands Howard Pyle. No one, we believe, made messages more clear; nor, do I feel, more beautiful, more mystical, more lofty in purpose.

Oakley had previously expounded his own philosophy of illustration as a "pictorial making clear" in an entire essay on that subject in The American Magazine of Art in 1919.

Throughout his career, Oakley was a member of many cultural institutions and clubs. He was a charter member of the Philadelphia Water Color Club in 1903, serving as its secretary from 1912 to 1938, at that time becoming its president. In 1932, in recognition of his artistic services to France, the Third French Republic decorated Oakley with the Palmes d'Officier d'Académie, an honor rarely conferred upon foreigners.

Thornton Oakley died in Bryn Mawr, Pennsylvania on Saturday, April 4, 1953.

== Book illustrations ==
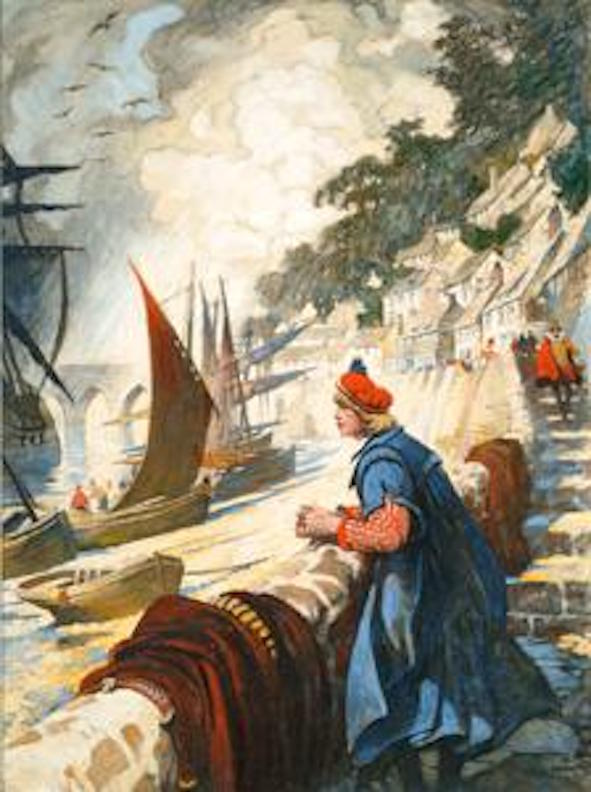
Amyas upon the Quay at Bideford in Westward Ho!, published 1920

Among the books Oakley illustrated are:

- A Son of the Desert by Bradley Gilman (1909, Century), an adventure novel for young readers (which was also serialized in St. Nicholas Magazine, 1908–1909)
- New Geography, Book One by Alexis Everett Frye (1917, Ginn), a geography textbook co-illustrated with N.C. Wyeth
- Westward Ho! by Charles Kingsley (1920, George W. Jacobs), a newer edition of an 1855 historical novel
- Philadelphia by Horace Mather Lippincott (1926, Macrae Smith), for which Oakley also wrote the foreword
- The Autobiography of Benjamin Franklin - a student edition, with questions, notes, and a continuation of Franklin's life, by D.H. Montgomery (1927, Ginn)
- Folk Tales of Brittany by Elsie Masson (1929, Macrae Smith), a book of fifteen Breton folk tales
- Awake America! (1934, Macrae Smith), a book of 23 poems written by Oakley's mother, Imogen Brashear Oakley (1854-1933)
- Six Historic Homesteads (1935 and 1962, University of Pennsylvania Press), a book describing six Colonial-era mansions, also written by his mother. Both of his mother's books were published posthumously to her death.

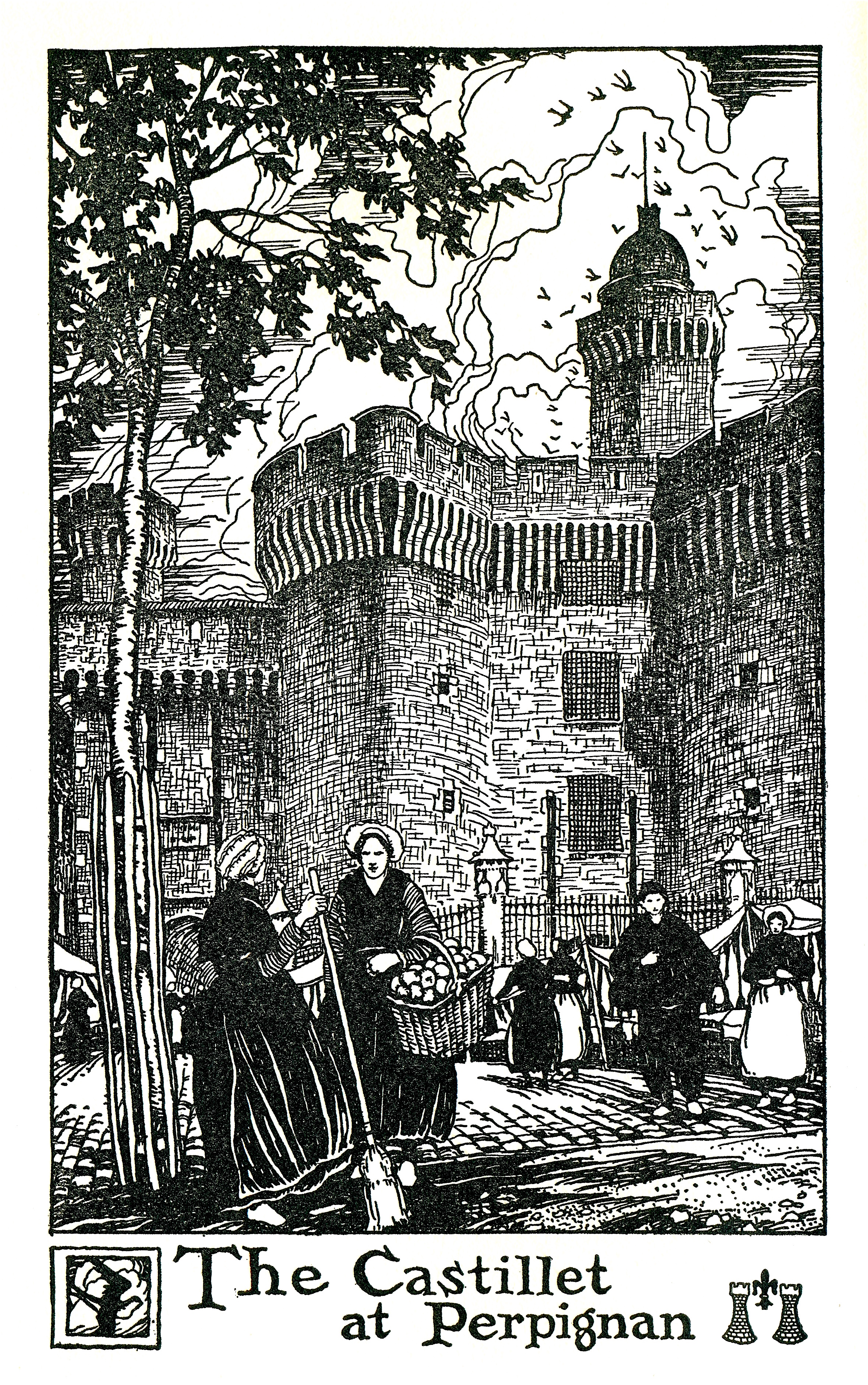
Pen-and-ink drawing in Hill-Towns of the Pyrenees, published 1923

- and, most notably, a series of eight travel books authored by his wife, Amy Oakley, each containing more than a hundred of his pen-and-ink illustrations:
1. Hill-Towns of the Pyrenees (1923, Century; 1924, John Long Ltd.)
2. Cloud-Lands of France (1927, Century)
3. Enchanted Brittany (1930, Century)
4. The Heart of Provence (1936, D. Appleton-Century)
5. Scandinavia Beckons (1938, D. Appleton-Century)
6. Behold the West Indies (1941 (1st), 1943 (2nd), D. Appleton-Century; 1951, Longmans Green)
7. Kaleidoscopic Quebec (1947, D. Appleton-Century; 1952, Longmans Green)
8. Our Pennsylvania: Keys to the Keystone State (1950, Bobbs-Merrill)

Though Oakley illustrated many books, he was the author of only one. In 1943, he published a short monograph as a tribute to his long-time friend and fellow artist, Cecilia Beaux, who had died in the previous year. Oakley met Beaux when he was only 17, and he remained one of Beaux's closest friends until the end of her life, even though she was 26 years his senior. Beaux achieved considerable fame as a portrait artist, and Oakley included a 1911 sketch that Beaux drew of him in the book. His wife Amy's book, The Heart of Provence (q.v.), was also dedicated to Beaux.

== Magazine illustrations ==
The following list is representative of the many magazines for which Oakley produced illustrations. In most instances, he illustrated the articles of others, but for some articles, he was both author and illustrator:

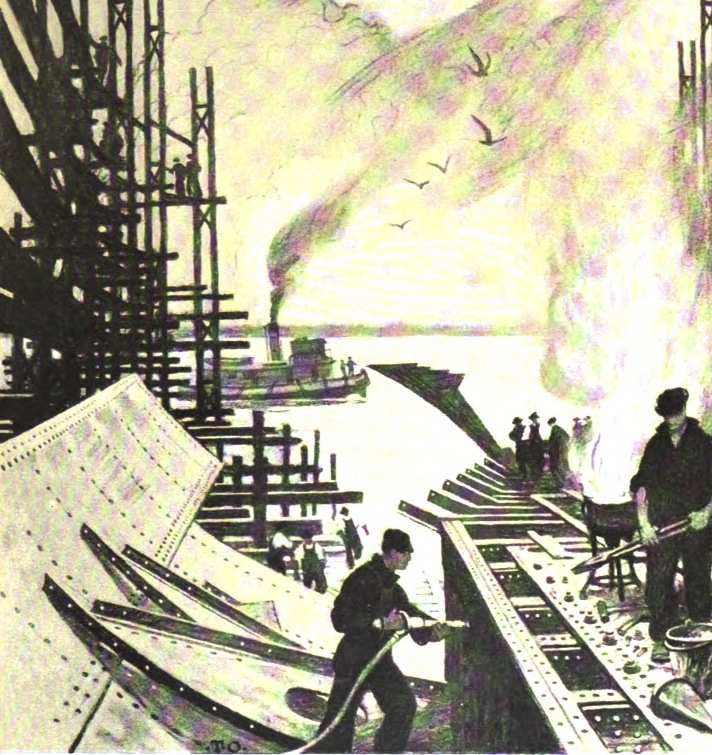
Riveters At Work at Hog Island Shipyard (Philadelphia), in Harper's Monthly Magazine, October 1918

- The American Magazine of Art - 1919, 1925
- Appleton's Magazine - 1907
- Asia - 1918
- Century - 1905-1912, 1916-1919
- Collier's - 1904-1918
- Everybody's - 1906-1909
- Harper's Monthly Magazine - 1905, 1906, 1907, 1908–1915, 1916, 1918
- International Studio - 1913, 1915
- Ladies' Home Journal - 1908
- Leslie's - 1904
- Metropolitan - 1907-1910
- National Geographic Magazine - 1942, 1943, 1945
- Nation's Business - 1919
- Pennsylvania Magazine - 1947
- Scientific American - 1918
- St. Nicholas Magazine - 1908-1909
- Scribner's Magazine - 1905-1916
- System - 1909
- The Forum - 1926-1927
- Western Pennsylvania Historical Magazine - 1948

One notable magazine article, which Oakley wrote but did not illustrate, was a tribute to his friend and fellow artist, Lucy Scarborough Conant, who had recently died.

In this article, written in 1921, Oakley presented his own definition of an artist:

For an artist is not merely one who paints with pigments. Whether a man speak with brush or mallet; pen or note; by utterances, statesmanship, gift, or friendship; whether by his daily routine, business, or by whatever activity to which his existence may be called; — if he thrill the inmost being, lift with visions toward the stars, reveal the beauty of ennobling life, then, and then alone, may he be named by that most inspiring of all titles, Artist.

== See also ==
- Brandywine School
