= Lucy Scarborough Conant =

American artist, costume, and set designer (1867–1920)

Lucy S. Conant
- Born: Lucy Scarborough Conant; March 10, 1867; Brooklyn, Connecticut, U.S.
- Died: December 31, 1920 (aged 53); Boston, Massachusetts, U.S.
- Known for: Painting, set design, costume design

Lucy Scarborough Conant (March 10, 1867 – December 31, 1920) was an American artist, and a costume and set designer.

== Biography ==
Born in Brooklyn, Connecticut, Lucy Scarborough Conant was the daughter of Albert Conant of Vermont and Catherine Scarborough Conant of Connecticut. Her father was an engineer and artist, and she and her two older brothers grew up in Boston.

Early in her career, Conant studied painting in France under the tutelage of Héctor Leroux, René Ménard, and of Jean-Paul Laurens, a professor at the Académie Julian, of whom she became a devoted disciple. She also studied with Julien Dupré.

A milestone of Conant's time in France was the summer of 1888, which she spent in the Breton town of Concarneau, with her new friend Cecilia Beaux. Conant and her mother Catherine, and Beaux and her cousin May Whitlock were a foursome in Concarneau. In her autobiography, Background with Figures, Beaux described that summer's activities in detail. Together they took lodging for the summer, which comprised two upstairs rooms in a house, and an attic which served as a kitchen, and afforded a view of the garden below and the sea in the distance. In this pleasant venue, Beaux painted a portrait of Catherine, and Conant learned much from Beaux, who was twelve years her senior. Beaux described her as "a delicate, brilliant girl, struggling against ill-health and imperfect eyesight, to become the artist she was born to be ... [who] had superabundant humanity, and almost outdid me in instantaneous and warm interest in passing individuals, as well as in every sight and sound and color." Of her language skills, Beaux wrote, "in about a week Lucy had become fluent in all of the Breton language she needed ..."

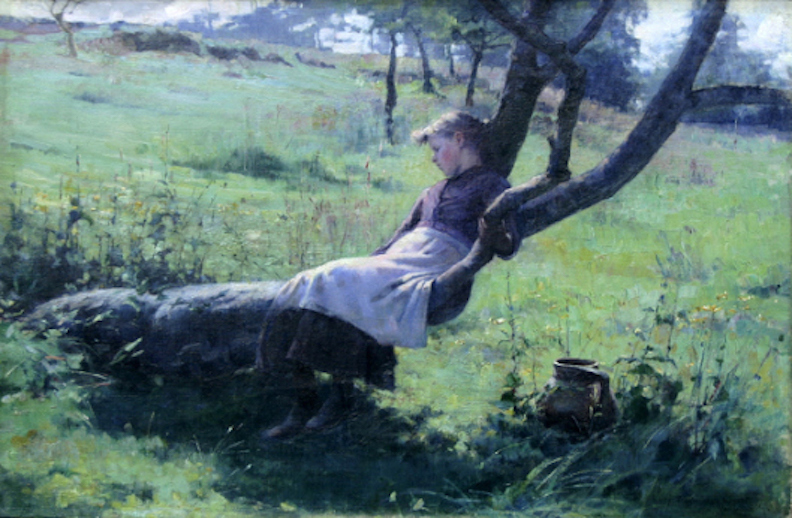
In the Old Apple Tree Oil on Canvas, 1890

From time to time during that summer, the foursome were visited by other expatriate American artists. Alexander Harrison, who piqued Conant's interest in painting marine scenes, and Charles Lazar, who offered criticism and encouragement, shared a studio in the neighborhood. Beaux noted: "In fact, their presence had been an important factor in drawing us to Concarneau. A.H. never gave criticism, but Lazar came, approved, and counseled."

Conant's virtuosity as an artist thrived in France, and one of her paintings, In the Old Apple Tree, was exhibited at the Paris Salon of 1891.

Returning to America from France, Conant settled in Boston, where her brother Theodore resided. She exhibited two works in the Palace of Fine Arts at the 1893 World's Columbian Exposition in Chicago – The Orchid Meadow (oil on canvas) and Nasturtiums (watercolor). In Boston she became an active painter, and exhibited at well-known institutions and galleries, including the Boston Art Club, the Doll & Richards Gallery and the Copley Society of Art. However, unlike her friend Beaux, who achieved fame as a portrait artist, Conant's major interest for the greater part of her life was landscape painting in oils and watercolor. At the Art Institute of Chicago where Conant exhibited in 1899, all three of her paintings – Flood Tide in the Cove, After Spring Rains, and Near Gerrish Island – were landscapes.

Conant participated in joint exhibitions with other artists as well. In the period 1917-1918, she and five other Boston women painters – Laura Coombs Hills, Margaret Jordan Patterson, Jane Peterson, Elizabeth Wentworth Roberts and Mary Bradish Titcomb – exhibited their works at the Boston gallery Doll & Richards, calling themselves simply "The Group". As art historian Cindy Nickerson remarked: "The Group probably envisioned themselves as the female counterparts of the Ten American Painters. Their work toured the country, with stops including Worcester Art Museum, Detroit Art Museum and Cleveland Museum of Art."

=== Set and costume design ===
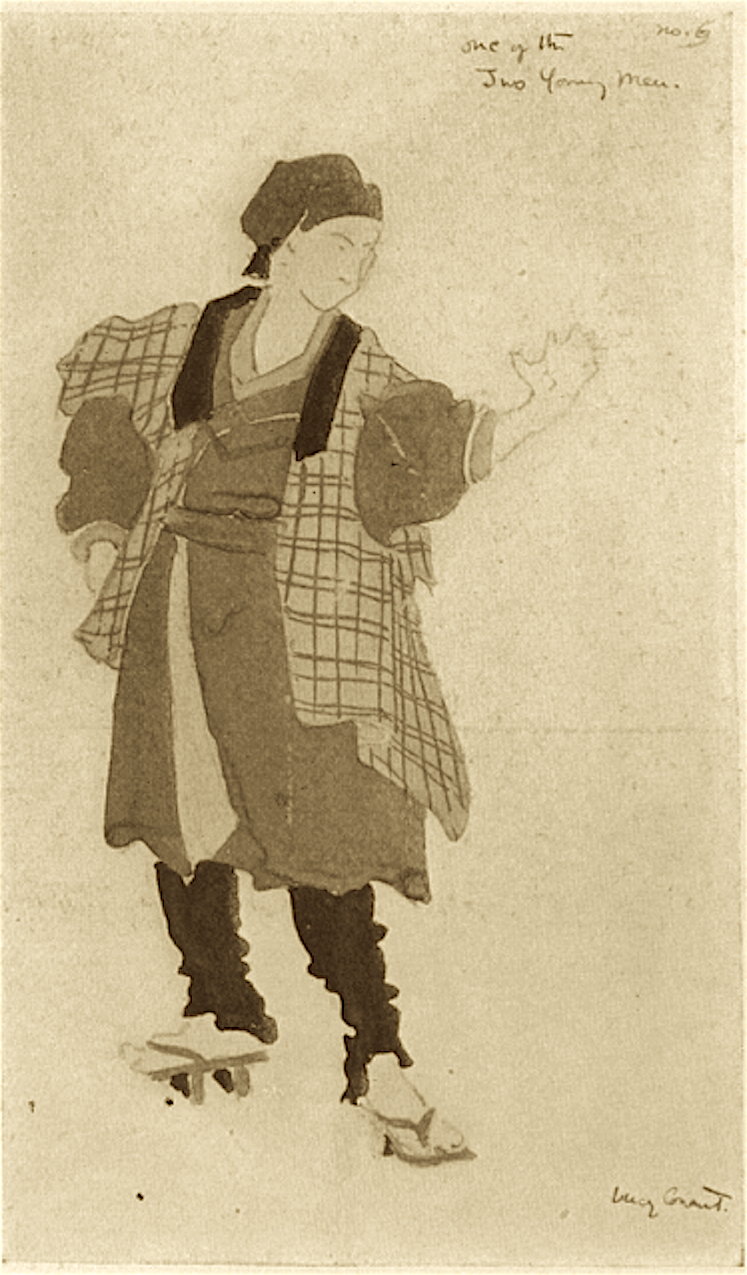
Costume designed for The Willow Wife, 1917

As her career progressed, Conant's interests widened. Friend and fellow artist Henry Hunt Clark wrote in 1921: "Lucy Conant had no intention of abandoning her interest in painting when, some six years ago [about 1915] she took up the study of design itself ... Her greatest interest and output was in stage design, scenery, costumes, production, scenario even. The number of productions set or costumed by her is a long one; eight plays for the Northampton Players, many others for schools, settlement houses and dramatic clubs, but notable among them are the pantomime The Willow Wife for the New England Conservatory of Music, and the Greek Harvest Festival pageant at Gloucester for which she also wrote the scenario." The tale of The Willow Wife was based upon an old Japanese legend. The New England Conservatory production was presented in Jordan Hall in December 1917, and staged as a pantomime in three scenes. The programme noted that "All scenery, costumes and properties have been designed by Miss Lucy Conant."

Conant's growing reputation as a costume and set designer led to an offer to teach at the University of California–Berkeley. She accepted a position as Lecturer in Design and Household Art for the 1918-19 school year, and conducted a laboratory in the history of costume, taught an upper division honors course, and gave a graduate level seminar in costume design. While at Berkeley, Conant also contributed her knowledge of costume and set design to the Partheneia, a springtime pageant that was presented annually by Berkeley's women students in the years from 1912 to 1931. According to Clark, "it was her direction that developed the glorious color sequences of the Parthenaia [sic] of 1920 at the University of California. This was her last work."

=== Death and legacy ===
Conant taught at UC–Berkeley for only two years, before her declining health, always frail, forced her to return to Boston. She died there at the end of 1920, at the age of 53. There is some confusion as to the exact date of her death. An obituary written in the American Art Annual of 1921 gives the date of her death as January 2, 1921. This has led to many references reporting the dates of her lifespan as 1867-1921. However, her friend and fellow artist Thornton Oakley, writing in The American Magazine of Art only eight months after her death, began his tribute to her with this sentence: '"Lucy Scarborough Conant died in Boston on the last day of the year 1920." Moreover, the Find A Grave web site shows a photograph of Conant's gravestone, located in South Cemetery, Windham County Connecticut, with the inscription "Born Mar. 10, 1867 Died Dec. 31, 1920".

A memorial exhibition of Conant's works was held at the Museum of Fine Arts, Boston, March 26 to April 30, 1922. Her friends and admirers created the Lucy Scarborough Conant Traveling Scholarship, to enable a student from the museum school to travel to Europe.

== Writings ==
Besides her time in France as a young artist, Conant visited several other European countries over the course of her career, among them the Netherlands, Switzerland, and Italy. These visits provided inspiration and subject matter for both her paintings and her essays, which typically contained many historical, literary, and artistic allusions. An example is her essay In Asolo, describing the Italian hill town, which had been the setting for the verse drama Pippa Passes by the English poet Robert Browning. The essay is not only a tribute to Browning, but also a colorful and fanciful vignette of the town and its residents as she observed them. Commenting on Conant's essays, her friend and fellow artist Thornton Oakley remarked: "Her essays, introspective, beneath the surface, stir the imaginative depths of fancy."

Lucy Scarborough Conant "painted" with words, as well as with oils and water colors. Thornton Oakley wrote in his eulogy of her: "Oil, water color, black and white, monotype, batik; representation, suggestion, pure fancy, pure design; essay, poetry, the music of the written word—she revelled in them all.'"

The following list includes some of the essays and poems Conant wrote over the course of her lifetime:
Essays

- "Marshes," Harpers Monthly Magazine, vol. 109, October 1904, pp. 763–768.
- "Tide-rivers," The Atlantic Monthly, vol. 97, April 1906, pp. 565–570.
- "In Asolo," Poet Lore, vol. 18, Spring 1907, pp. 247–258.
- "Voices," The Atlantic Monthly, vol. 102, August 1908, pp. 271–275.
- "Marmolata of the Dolomites," The Atlantic Monthly, vol. 104, July 1909, pp. 30–33.
- "The Sea from Harbors," The Atlantic Monthly, vol. 104, September 1909, pp. 410–411.

Verse

- "A Group of Sea Poems," Poet Lore, vol. VIII, Issue 8, October 1896, pp. 476–478.
- "The Old Burying Ground," The Cambridge Chronicle (newspaper), January 2, 1897, p. 11.
- "Willow Dale," The Atlantic Monthly, vol. 80, September 1897, p. 405.
