= William J. Whittemore =

American painter

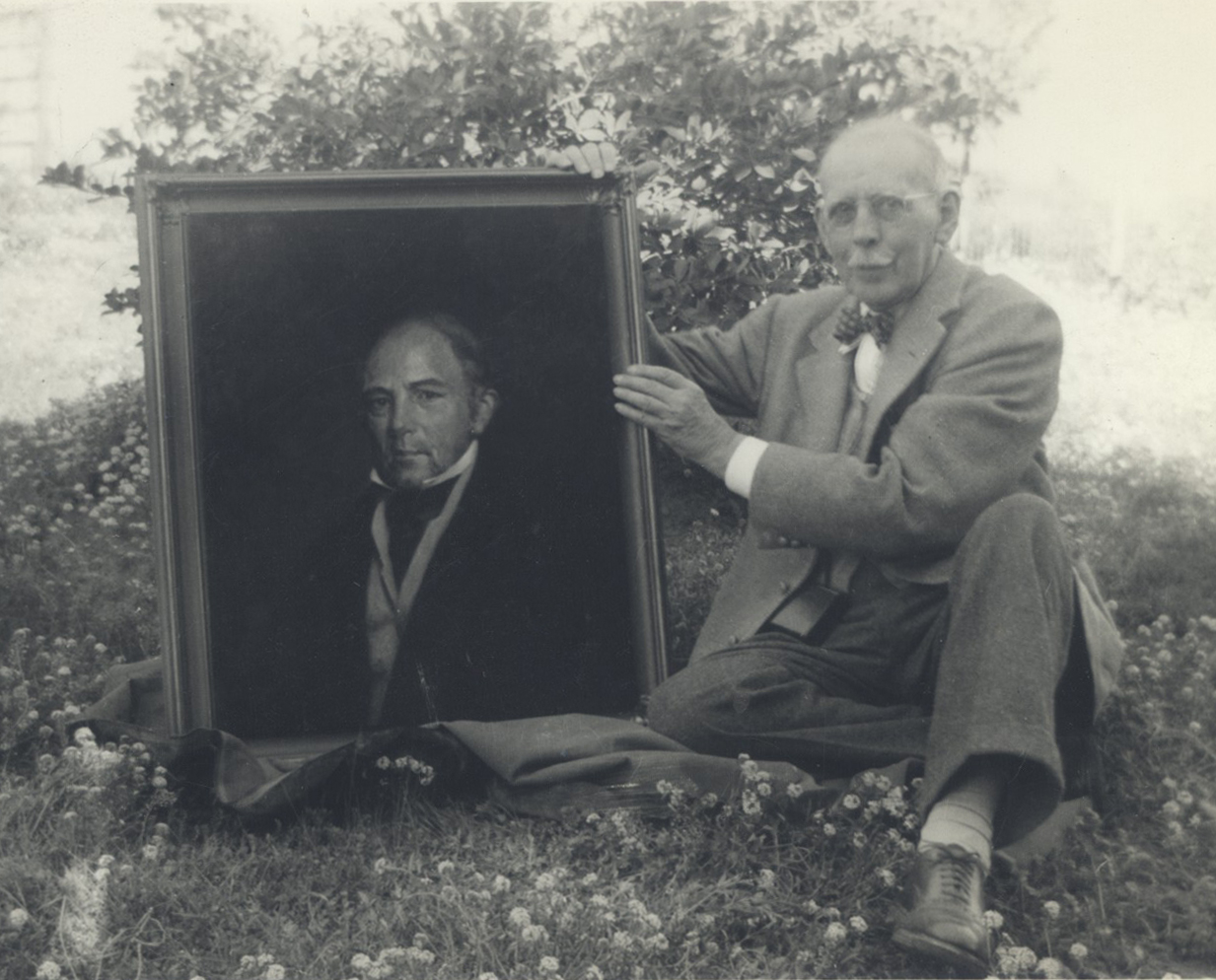
- Photo of William J. Whittemore holding a portrait he painted.
- Born: 1860; New York City
- Died: February 7, 1955 (aged 94); New Hampton, New York
- Occupation: Painter
- Spouses: Alice Vaud Whittemore; Alice Charlotte Simpson

William J. Whittemore (1860–February 7, 1955) was an American painter.

== Early life ==
William John Whittemore was born in 1860 in New York City. He learned painting in 1877, under the tutelage of painter William Howard Hart (1863-1937). From 1882 to 1886, he studied painting at the National Academy of Design under the tutelage of Walter Satterlee (1844-1908), and at the Art Students League of New York under James Carroll Beckwith (1852-1917). From 1888 to 1889, he studied at the Académie Julian in Paris under Jules Joseph Lefebvre (1836-1911) and Jean-Joseph Benjamin-Constant (1845-1902).

== Career ==
Whittemore taught miniature painting at the Art Students League of New York from 1900 to 1902 and at the YMCA of Greater New York.

Whittemore became an Associate at the National Academy of Design in 1897 and became a founding member of the American Society of Miniature Painters in 1899. He won a silver medal at the Paris Exposition of 1900, the J.D. McCarthy Prize of the Pennsylvania Society of Miniature Painters in 1934, and the medal of honor of the California Society of Miniature Painters in 1942.

His portrait of William Stryker Gummere, Chief Justice of the Supreme Court of New Jersey, hangs in the New Jersey State House in Trenton, New Jersey. Additionally, his portrait of Frank Armstrong Crawford Vanderbilt (1839-1885), the second wife of Cornelius Vanderbilt (1794–1877), hangs in Kirkland Hall on the campus of Vanderbilt University in Nashville, Tennessee.

== Personal life ==
Whittemore was married to Alice Vaud Whittemore (1868-1911), a painter whom he met in Paris. They resided in Manhattan and summered at Robinsfield, their residence in New Hampton, New York. After his first wife died, he married another painter, Alice Charlotte Simpson (1863-1955). He died on February 7, 1955, in New Hampton, New York.
