= Laura Coombs Hills =

American artist and illustrator

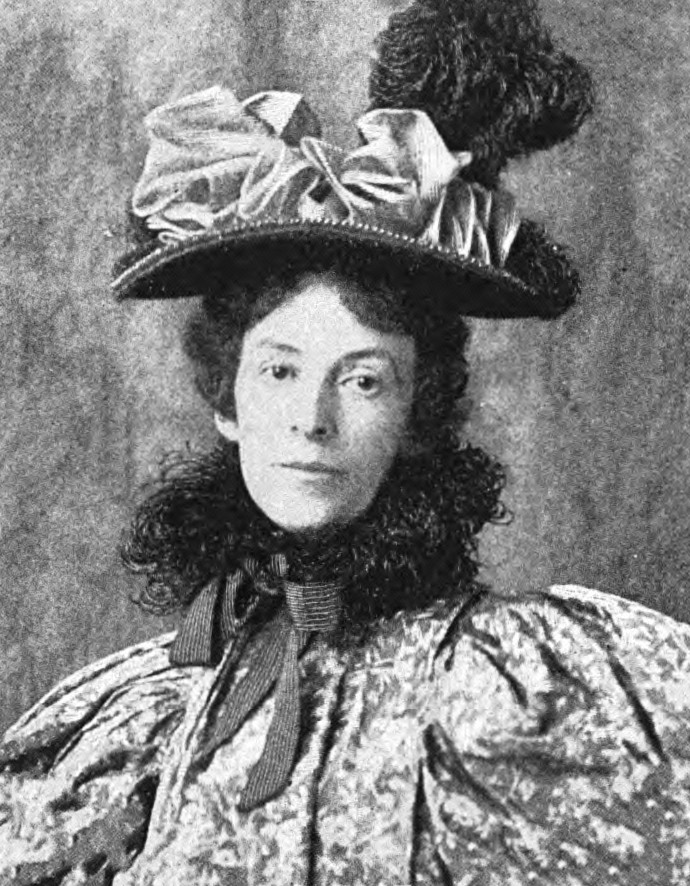
- Photograph of Laura Coombs Hills, ca. 1899.
- Born: September 7, 1859; Newburyport
- Died: February 21, 1952 (aged 92)
- Education: Helen M. Knowlton, William Merritt Chase
- Known for: painting, watercolor

Laura Coombs Hills (1859–1952) was an American artist and illustrator who specialized in watercolor and pastel still life paintings, especially of flowers, and miniature portrait paintings on ivory. She became the first miniature painter elected to the Society of American Artists, and was a founder of the American Society of Miniature Painters. She also worked as a designer and illustrated children's books for authors such as Kate Douglas Wiggin and Anna M. Pratt.

== Early life and education ==
Hills was born September 7, 1859 in Newburyport, Massachusetts, the third of five children of Mary Gerrish Hills and Philip Knapp Hills. Her father was a banker and the family was relatively well to do. Although she showed an early interest in art, her formal training was limited: mainly three winters in Boston with Helen M. Knowlton, who was leading classes for women artists that had previously been taught by William Morris Hunt. She was also enrolled for two months at the Cowles Art School. In early 1882, she left Boston to study life drawing for three months at the Art Students League of New York; one of her teachers there was William Merritt Chase.

In the early 1900s, Hills would establish her studio in Boston, but she continued to spend her summers at a house known as the Goldfish that she built in Newburyport and shared with one of her sisters. Between 1890 and 1929, she made five trips to Europe to immerse herself in that continent's art and culture.

== Art career ==
=== Watercolors and pastels ===
In the 1880s, Hills painted a group of landscapes in oil that were clearly influenced by the Barbizon school; they also show influence from the work of Knowlton. In general, her mature paintings align with the romanticized Impressionism of Boston School painters like Edmund C. Tarbell, while her design work shows strong kinship with Art Nouveau. She was an early member of the Guild of Boston Artists, and her work was included in a 2001 retrospective show "A Woman's Perspective: Founding and Early Women Members of the Guild of Boston Artists, 1914–1945."

Hills came to prefer watercolor and pastel to oils even though these media were at the time considered suitable only for preliminary work and were not often exhibited. This situation began to change early in Hills' career, spurred in part by the founding of national and local watercolor and pastel societies in the late 1800s. Hills had her first solo exhibition in 1889 at the J. Eastman Chase Gallery in Boston, showing a group of pastel landscapes and still lifes. The following year, she showed work at the Boston Water Color Club's Fourth Annual Exhibition, which was also held at the Chase Gallery. She exhibited watercolors and pastels throughout her career, and focused on pastels in her later years as her eyesight began to fail.

Hills specialized in painting vividly colored tabletop arrangements of flowers that she mostly grew in her own garden in Newburyport, and one contemporary reviewer referred to her as the "Queen of Flower Painters" (likewise as the "Queen of Miniature Painters": on which point, see below). A pastel entitled Larkspur, Peonies, and Canterbury Bells that the Boston Museum of Fine Arts bought in 1926 has consistently been the best-selling image in the museum's gift shop.

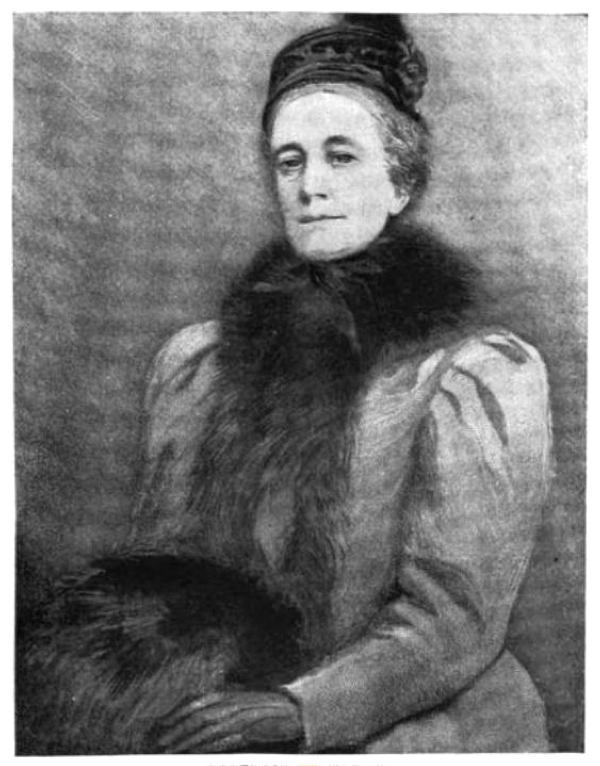
Laura Coombs Hills, Portrait of Mrs. T., miniature painted on ivory ca. 1899.

=== Miniatures ===
In the 1890s, on a visit to England, Hills became fascinated by miniature paintings on ivory. She taught herself the painstaking technique and by 1893 had completed a series of miniature portraits of girls from her hometown. These Seven Pretty Girls of Newburyport, which launched her on a decades-long career as a miniature portrait painter, are now in the collection of the Boston Museum of Fine Arts along with come of her other miniature paintings. She was considered one of the best miniature painters in America and something of an innovator in the medium, especially in her use of broad paint handling, bright colors, and line work in place of traditional stippling.

One of her more unusual commissions came in 1896, when Emily Dickinson's sister Lavinia arranged for Hills to retouch one of the few existing photographs of the deceased poet, an austere formal portrait that had been taken when Dickinson was around 16 and which neither Dickinson nor her sister had thought was a good likeness. Hills used the photograph as a base to create a memorial portrait; the result, featuring a softened, curlier hairline and a frilly-necked dress, pleased Lavinia. Between 1913 and 1937, this portrait appeared in half a dozen volumes of work by and about the poet that were produced by Dickinson's niece Martha Dickenson Bianchi.

In 1897, Hills became the first miniature painter elected to the Society of American Artists and one of very few women in the SAA. A year later, she became one of the founders of the American Society of Miniature Painters, serving for a period as its vice-president. Her work with miniatures declined after 1920, due to failing eyesight.

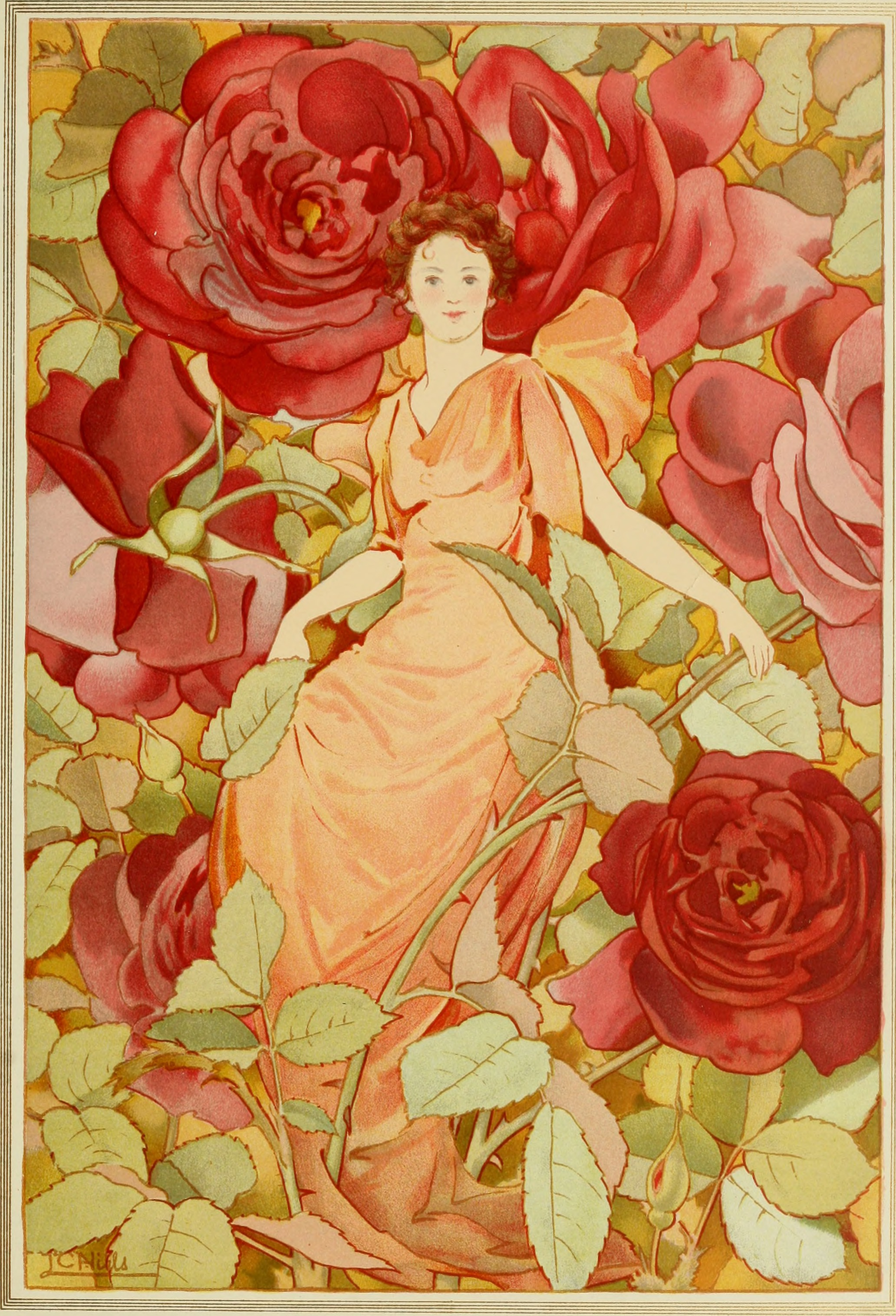
Laura Coombs Hills, image from 1897 Dream Roses calendar

=== Design and Illustration ===
Hills supported herself in part with commercial artwork, painting watercolors for greeting cards and calendars (especially for Louis Prang), drawing patterns for needlework, and decorating pottery. Her 1897 calendar Dream Roses—which featured Art Nouveau–inspired images of young women surrounded by masses of flowers—was particularly well received. She also sold illustrations to the children's magazine St. Nicholas and illustrated children's books such as an 1889 edition of Kate Douglas Wiggin's The Birds' Christmas Carol and Anna M. Pratt's Flower Folk. She continued this work even after she was routinely selling out her exhibitions of pastels and watercolors and gaining commissions for her miniatures.

=== Awards and later life ===
Exhibiting her paintings and miniatures widely, Hills won a number of medals at national and international expositions, including among others the 1900 Paris Exposition, the 1901 Pan-American Exposition, the 1904 St. Louis Exposition, and the 1915 Panama–Pacific International Exposition. Between 1917 and 1919, she exhibited with an informal and short-lived group of women artists in Boston led by Lucy Scarborough Conant and known as "The Group".

Hills worked as an artist nearly until her death on February 21, 1952. Her papers are in the Archives of American Art at the Smithsonian Institution and in the Historical Society of Old Newbury in Newburyport.
