= Sarah Campbell Allan =

First female doctor in South Carolina (1861–1954)

- Sarah Campbell Allan at her graduation of Women's Medical College of the New York Infirmary.
- Born: December 7, 1861; Charleston, SC
- Died: February 25, 1954 (aged 92); Charleston, SC
- Burial place: Magnolia Cemetery
- Education: Charleston Female Seminary; Women's Medical College of the New York Infirmary
- Occupation: Doctor
- Employer: South Carolina Lunatic Asylum
- Known for: First female doctor in South Carolina

Sarah Campbell Allan (December 7, 1861 - February 25, 1954) was the first female doctor in the state of South Carolina. Allan worked for the South Carolina Lunatic Asylum and was instrumental in helping women's access to medical school and advanced degrees.

== Early life and education ==
Sarah Campbell Allan was born in Charleston, South Carolina, on December 7, 1861. She was one of eight children born to James Allan, a merchant, and Amy Hobcraft. Both her parents were immigrants to Charleston; her father was from Scotland, and her mother was from London. Sarah Campbell Allan was the third child. Her two older siblings died young, leaving Sarah as her parents oldest child. Sarah Allan attended and graduated from the Charleston Female Seminary, an all-female school.

Sarah Campbell Allan applied to the Medical College of South Carolina to pursue a medical degree, but she was denied because of her gender. Allan considered becoming a nurse instead, but her father urged her to chase her dream. Allan attended the Women's Medical College of the New York Infirmary, graduating in 1894.

== Career ==
After graduating from medical school, Allan worked as a resident physician at a sanitarium in Baltimore, Maryland. In October 1884, Allan moved back to Charleston and took the newly instituted medical examinations in South Carolina. Also in that month, she was the only female present and outscored her male counterparts. Allan was issued license number 40, becoming the first female doctor in the state of South Carolina. After receiving her license, Allan was offered a teaching job at Converse College, but she declined in order to practice medicine. South Carolina’s Governor at the time, John Gary Evans, wrote Allan asking if she would consider working at the South Carolina State Lunatic Asylum in Columbia as an assistant physician caring for female patients. Allan accepted and started on October 1, 1895. She also taught classes on anatomy and physiology at a nearby nursing school.

== Post-work life ==
After 11 years of service to the state, Allan moved back home to Charleston in 1907 to take care of her sick father. She never formally practiced medicine again. However, she occasionally took on a few patients. For the rest of Allan's life, she worked for charities and civic organizations, including her local Presbyterian church. She traveled and read in her free time. Sarah Campbell Allan died in her home in Charleston on February 25, 1954. Allan is buried in Magnolia Cemetery in Charleston.
