= Charleston Female Seminary =

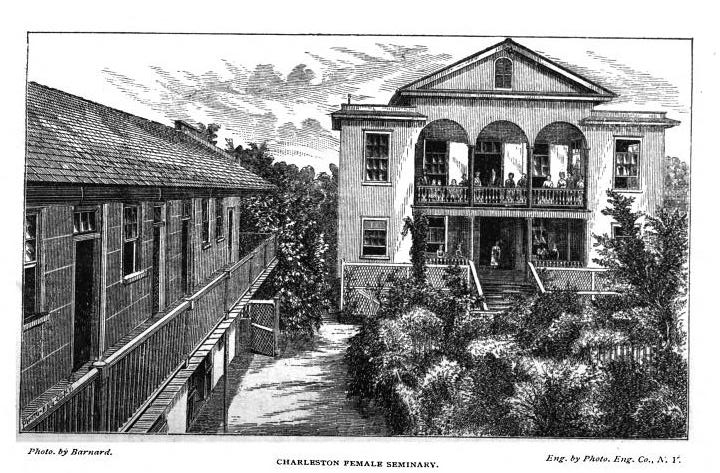
- Charleston Female Seminary at its Philip Street location
- Charleston, South Carolina; United States

Information
- Type: Private, All-Female
- Motto: Mens sana in corpore sano ("A sound mind in a sound body.")
- Religious affiliation: Christian
- Established: 1830
- Founder: Henrietta "Etta" Aiken Kelly

The Charleston Female Seminary, was a private Christian school for wealthy white girls in Charleston, South Carolina, United States. Opened in 1830, the female seminary was the second school in Charlestown for young women.

== Background ==
The establishment of Charlestown Female Seminary was part of a movement to facilitate the education of young women that took root in the United States in the 1820s and 1830s. The movement started in 1814 with the establishment by Catherine Fiske, in Keene, New Hampshire, of the "Young Ladies Seminary." Another important early school was Emma Willard's Troy Female Seminary, opened in 1821 in Troy, New York.

Charlestown became the site of a pair of what amateur historian Charles Zellner, of the Charlestown Historical Society, called the "earliest boarding schools" for young women. The first of these was the Mount Benedict Academy, a combined Roman Catholic convent and finishing school for young ladies, established in 1828 by Benedict Fenwick, Roman Catholic bishop of Boston. That academy was staffed by Ursuline nuns. Mount Benedict acquired a superior reputation, leading both Catholic and Protestant families to enroll their daughters there. Despite that acceptance, in 1834 the Academy was burned by an anti-Catholic mob.

== Historical context ==
The Charlestown Female Seminary, located at 50 Philip Street, in a building constructed in 1871 by architect John Henry Devereux. Devereux used "mixed Roman" Italianate architecture, and "an arcaded and pedimented facade".

== Distinguished alumnae ==
A notable alumna was author Beatrice Witte Ravenel, mother of the South Carolina architectural historiographer Beatrice St. Julien Ravenel.

Another was Hermine Kean Bulwinkle (1868–1942), who married Solomon Anderson Wolff (1861–1954) in 1890. Both were on the faculty Gaston College, Dallas, N.C.

A third notable alumna was Sarah Campbell Allan (1861–1954), who went on to become a physician in spite of educational and professional barriers she encountered as a woman. After completing a medical preparatory course at the South Carolina College for Women in Columbia and studying medicine at the Women's Medical College of the New York Infirmary for Women and Children, in 1894 she was licensed as a physician by the state of South Carolina. She was the only woman in the pool of applicants examined by the South Carolina Medical Board that year, the first time the board sat to examine applicants, and she received the board's highest grade. As a doctor, for 11 years Allan worked with female patients at the South Carolina Hospital for the Insane in Columbia and taught anatomy and physiology to nursing students.

Sarah Visanska graduated from the Charleston Female Seminary in 1889. She was president of the South Carolina Federation of Women's Clubs from 1910-1912.

The writer, lecturer, and artist, Louise Hammond Willis Snead, was a student at Charleston Female Seminary, and also had charge of the painting and drawing classes.

== See also ==
- Women in education in the United States
