= Emily Drayton Taylor =

American miniature painter

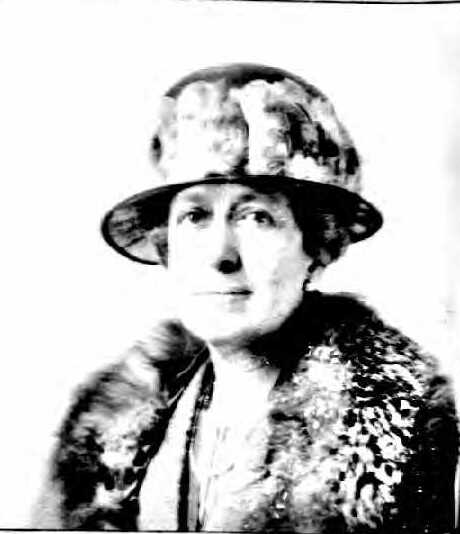
- Born: April 14, 1860; Philadelphia
- Died: June 19, 1952 (aged 92); Philadelphia
- Occupation: Miniature painter
- Works: William McKinley
- Spouse(s): J. Madison Taylor
- Parent(s): Henry Edward Drayton

Emily Heyward Drayton Taylor (April 14, 1860 – June 19, 1952) was an American miniature painter.

== Biography ==
Emily Heyward Drayton was born on April 14, 1860 in Philadelphia, the daughter of Henry Edward Drayton, a Philadelphia physician, and Mary Brady Drayton. She married neurologist Dr. John Madison Taylor in 1879.

Taylor studied art under Cécile Ferrère-Guérin in Paris, likely in the 1870s, and at the Pennsylvania Academy of Fine Arts in 1877. She painted over 400 miniature portraits, including likenesses of US President William McKinley and First Lady Ida Saxton McKinley in 1899. One of her works, now in the Metropolitan Museum of Art, is a copy of a work by Edward Greene Malbone, a painting of the eye of Maria Miles Heyward Drayton, her paternal grandmother.

Taylor was the founding president of the Pennsylvania Society of Miniature Painters, serving from 1901 to 1951. She wrote the chapter "Miniature Painting as an Art" for the book Heirlooms in Miniatures (1898) by Anne Hollingsworth Wharton, the first book on the history of American miniatures.

Emily Drayton Taylor died on June 19, 1952, in Philadelphia at the age of 92.
