= Museum of Nebraska Art =

Art museum in Kearney, Nebraska, U.S.

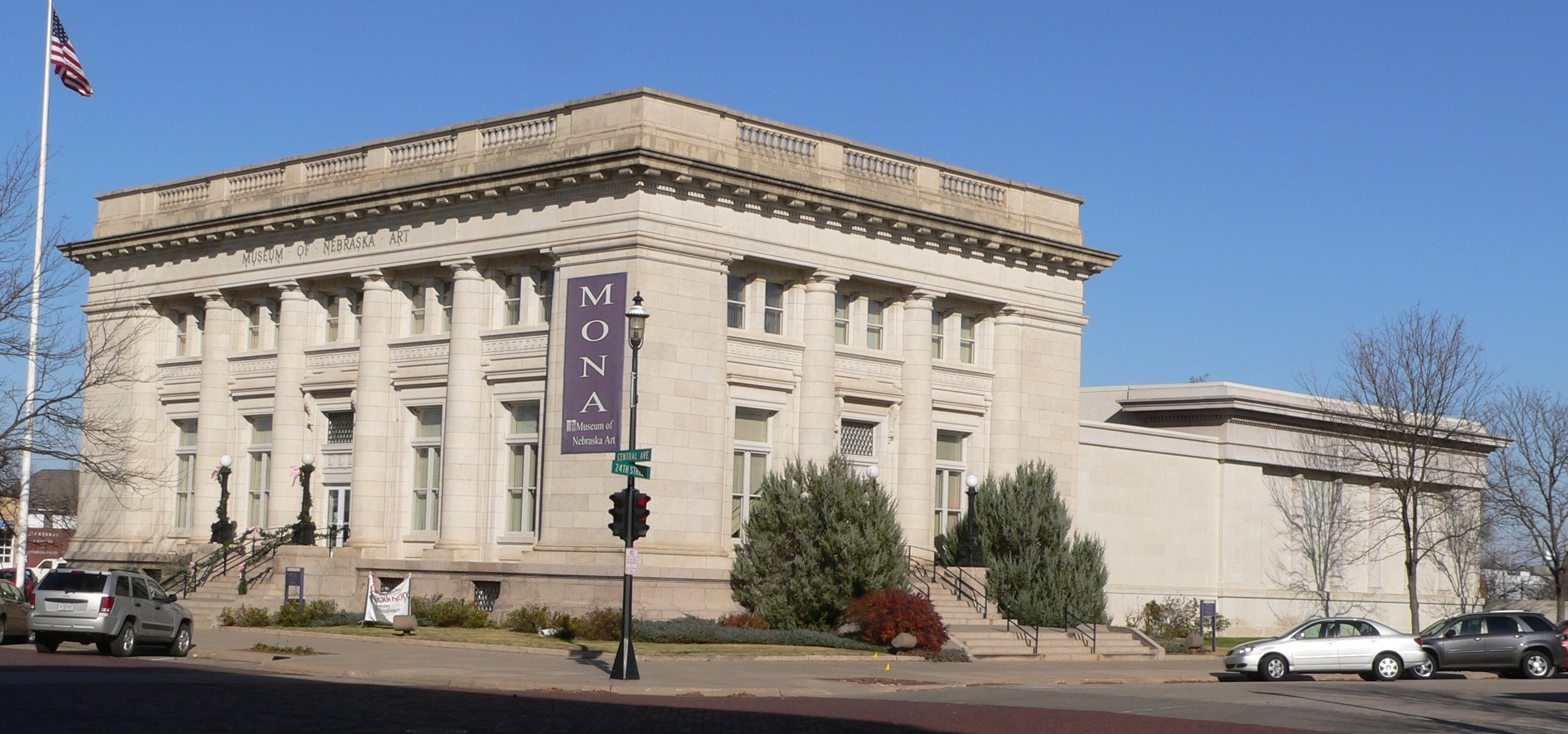
- Museum of Nebraska Art in 2009
- Established: 1976
- Location: 2401 Central Ave., Kearney, Nebraska, U.S.
- Coordinates: 40.699732364270346°N 99.0811188512494°W
- Type: Art museum
- Owner: University of Nebraska at Kearney
- Website: mona.unk.edu
- U.S. Post Office
- U.S. National Register of Historic Places
- Built: 1911
- Architect: James Knox Taylor
- Architectural style: Neoclassical Revival
- NRHP reference No.: 81000368
- Added to NRHP: September 17, 1981

The Museum of Nebraska Art (MONA) is an art museum in Kearney, Nebraska, United States. It is the official art museum of the state of Nebraska and is administratively affiliated with the University of Nebraska at Kearney. The museum was formed in 1976 and moved to its current location at the former U.S. Post Office in 1986. The official charter of MONA makes it home to the Nebraska Art Collection, which is home to works by artists who were born in Nebraska, have lived in Nebraska, or have some connection to Nebraska.

== History ==
The Museum of Nebraska Art was originally formed in 1976 as the Nebraska Art Collection. It was originally operated by Kearney State College and did not have a permanent facility. By 1985, the museum had outgrown its rented space, and purchased the former U.S. Post Office that same year. The building was listed on the National Register of Historic Places in 1981, and was vacated previously after the post office moved further downtown. The building was expanded and renovated for use as a museum. Construction was completed in 1986, and the new facility opened that same year.

In 2021, the museum closed for another set of extensive renovations and another addition. The addition would add 16,000 square feet (1,500 m^{2}) to the museum, and was built using mass timber construction. The museum re-opened in May 2025.

== Collection ==
The Museum of Nebraska Art is home to the Nebraska Art Collection. The Nebraska Art Collection covers over 175 years of Nebraska art and art history. Many historic artists with Nebraska connections have their work in the permanent collection, such as Alice Eliza Cleaver, Robert Henri, John Philip Falter, and Frank Rinehart. The museum is also home to works by more modern artists, like Thomas Hart Benton, Wright Morris, and Leonard Thiessen, as well as living artists such as Jun Kaneko and Jane Golding Marie.

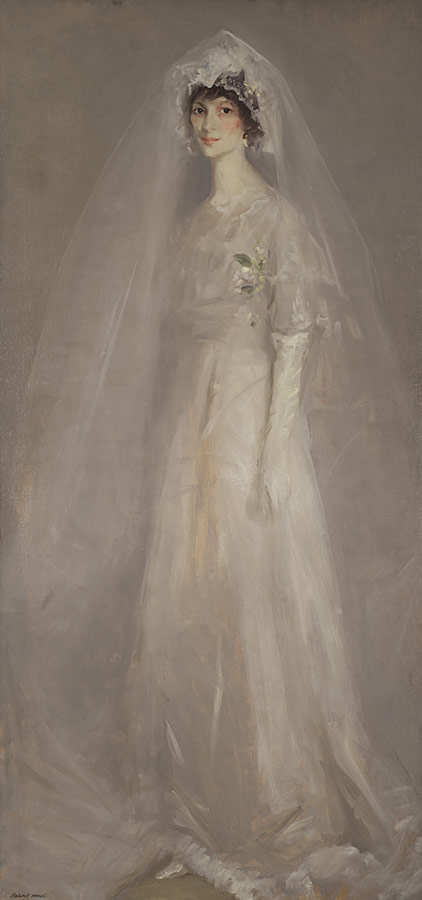
"Girl in Wedding Gown", a portrait of Eulabee Dix by Robert Henri in the museum's permanent collection

== Architecture ==
The Museum of Nebraska Art is located inside of the former U.S Post Office. The post office was built in 1911 and was designed by James Knox Taylor. The post office was built in the Neoclassical Revival architectural style. After being converted for museum use, the building was expanded twice, once in 1986, and another in 2025. The first addition retains the original style of the building, while the latest addition is built using mass timber construction and was designed by BVH Architecture.
