= Alice E. Cleaver =

American painter (1870–1944)

- Born: Alice E. Cleaver; 1870; Racine, Wisconsin
- Died: 1944 (aged 73–74); Falls City, Nebraska
- Education: University of Nebraska, Lincoln, School of The Art Institute of Chicago, Pennsylvania Academy of the Fine Arts

Alice E. Cleaver (1870-1944) was an American artist known for impressionistic oil paintings depicting women, music, and still life, as well as for her scenes of daily life and landscapes in the American Southwest.

== Early life and education ==
Cleaver was born in Racine, Wisconsin, in 1878. In 1884, Cleaver and her family moved to Falls City, Nebraska, where she graduated from Falls City High School in 1888. Cleaver attended the University of Nebraska in Lincoln for music from 1892 to 1895. She took classes under art instructor Cora Parker. Cleaver's sketches were said to be among the best in a University exhibition by The Lincoln Courier in 1895.

After graduation, she lived in Falls City until she started school at the School of The Art Institute of Chicago from 1899 to 1903. At the Art Institute, Cleaver studied under John Vanderpoel and Frederick Freer, and one of her sketches illustrated an article on art education written by the Institute's director, W. M. R. French. Cleaver continued her academic career with two scholarships at the Pennsylvania Academy of the Fine Arts, where she studied for three years with William Merritt Chase and Cecelia Beaux. She also studied in Paris before moving back to Falls City.

Cleaver's artistic style was influenced by Impressionism, but her color palette was muted, similar to Tonalism.

== Career and later life ==
Cleaver was chosen as a sponsored artist in 1905 for the Santa Fe Railway to paint images of the American Southwest and the Pueblos. The Santa Fe Railway Company purchased her painting of Pueblo peoples in 1907. Cleaver spent time in Isleta, New Mexico, painting the everyday life of the Pueblo for the Railway. One of her larger works was purchased by the El Tovar Hotel at the Grand Canyon and hangs there today.

According to The Falls City Tribune, in February 1907, Cleaver had two paintings chosen for the Chicago Art Exhibit. In 1909, Cleaver was appointed as the art director of the City Federation of Women's Clubs.

In 1913, Cleaver moved to work in Paris under the instruction of Lucien Simon and Louis-François Biloul. Her studies were cut short due to the start of World War 1 in 1914 and she moved back to Falls City where she lived the rest of her life. Cleaver was often mentioned in the Falls City Tribune in regards to her music lessons and her violin performances.

The Omaha Bee nominated Cleaver for the Nebraska Hall of Fame in their April 25, 1923, issue due to her accomplishments in art and her work for the Santa Fe Railway. She was accepted into the Nebraska Hall of Fame in the following year, 1924.

In 1944, Cleaver died in her sleep, aged 74, due to heart problems in Falls City, Nebraska. She developed heart issues after a severe case of influenza. She requested that the music at her service be performed by her students.

== Selected works ==
- Memories, 1911
- The Ironing Girl,1914
- Girl with Palette, 1915
- Girl in White, 1911-1915
- Aunt Nettie, n.d.
- The Cast Room, n.d.

== Exhibitions ==
- Louisiana Purchase Exposition, St. Louis, Missouri, 1904 and 1911
- Omaha Society of Fine Arts, Omaha, Nebraska,1922
  - Cleaver won the John L. Webster Prize
- Nebraska Art Association in Lincoln, Nebraska, 1921
- Midwestern Artists in Kansas City, Missouri, 1928
- Omaha Art Guild, Omaha, Nebraska, 1926 and 1935
- Lydia Brunn Woods Memorial Library, Falls City, Nebraska,1946
- Falls City Art Association and the Friends of the Library, Falls City, Nebraska, 1970
- Museum of Nebraska Art, Kearney, Nebraska, 1986
