= American Society of Miniature Painters =

Professional association

The American Society of Miniature Painters (ASMP) was an association of miniature painters, organized in March 1899.

The ten founding members of the ASMP included Virginia Richmond Reynolds, Isaac A. Josephi, William Jacob Baer, Alice Beckington, Lucia Fairchild Fuller, Laura Coombs Hills, John A. McDougall, Theodora W. Thayer, Lydia Field Emmet, and William J. Whittemore.

The society exhibited regularly through 1930, then occasionally at the Grand Central Art Galleries. In 1950, its anniversary was observed by a special exhibit co-sponsored by the New York Metropolitan Museum of Art and the Smithsonian American Art Museum, showing 248 works by 150 artists. Its final surviving member, Glenora Richards, died in 2009.

== Notable members ==
- Virginia Hendrickson Irvin
- Annie Hurlburt Jackson
- Elsie Dodge Pattee
- Louise Hammond Willis Snead
- Glenora Richards
