= Pennsylvania Society of Miniature Painters =

The Pennsylvania Society of Miniature Painters (PSMP) was founded in 1901 by Emily Drayton Taylor to promote the work of miniature portrait painters in Pennsylvania. The society played a key role in supporting and exhibiting artists who worked in miniature, particularly women artists, and held exhibitions annually from 1902 to 1951.

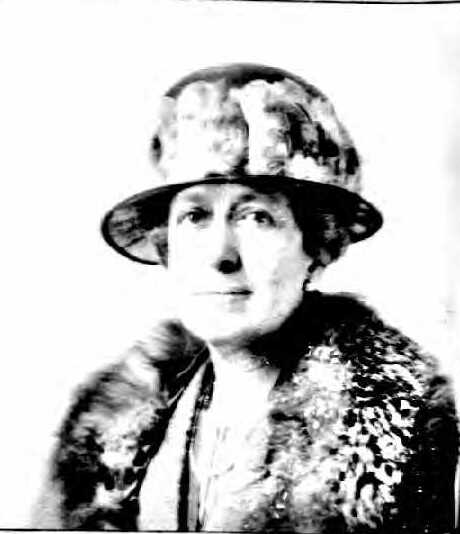
Emily Drayton Taylor, President of PSMP

== Exhibitions ==
The society held annual exhibitions from 1902 through 1951. From 1909 onward, PSMP exhibitions were held concurrently with The Pennsylvania Academy of Fine Arts annual Water Color Exhibition. Beginning in 1913, both exhibitions were published together in a shared catalogue.

An analysis of the annual exhibitions between 1902 and 1922 demonstrates the society’s strong representation of women artists. In many years, women made up more than 90% of the total exhibiting artists.

While catalogues for the years 1902, 1903, 1904, and 1905 have not been located, surviving documentation from 1906 through 1922 includes detailed records of artists, dates, and venues.

The PSMP also participated in national miniature exhibitions like the 1933 "A Century of Progress" exhibition in Chicago, IL.

== Leadership ==
Emily Drayton Taylor served as president of the society from its founding in 1901 until its final exhibition in 1951. Anna Margaretta Archambault, a miniature painter and author, served as secretary for many years.

== Membership ==
The Pennsylvania Society of Miniature Painters was notable for its majority female membership. Based on exhibition records from 1902 to 1922, more than 90% of participating artists were women, with many exhibiting repeatedly over the years.

Several members stood out for their consistent involvement:

- Emily Drayton Taylor, the society’s founder and president, exhibited 69 times.
- Anna Margaretta Archambault, a longtime secretary and miniature painter, exhibited 66 times.
- Lucy May Stanton and Evelyn Purdie exhibited over 50 and 28 times respectively.
- Other frequent exhibitors included Sally Cross, Helen Winslow Durkee, Bertha Coolidge, Alta Elizabeth Wilmont, and Martha Wheeler Baxter, each with over 25 exhibitions.

Other notable members include Berta Carew and Rebecca Burd Peale Patterson, whose works are held by the Philadelphia Museum of Art.

A full analytic chart of membership and exhibition participation from 1902 to 1922 has been compiled by the Philadelphia Museum of Art.

== Relationship with PAFA ==
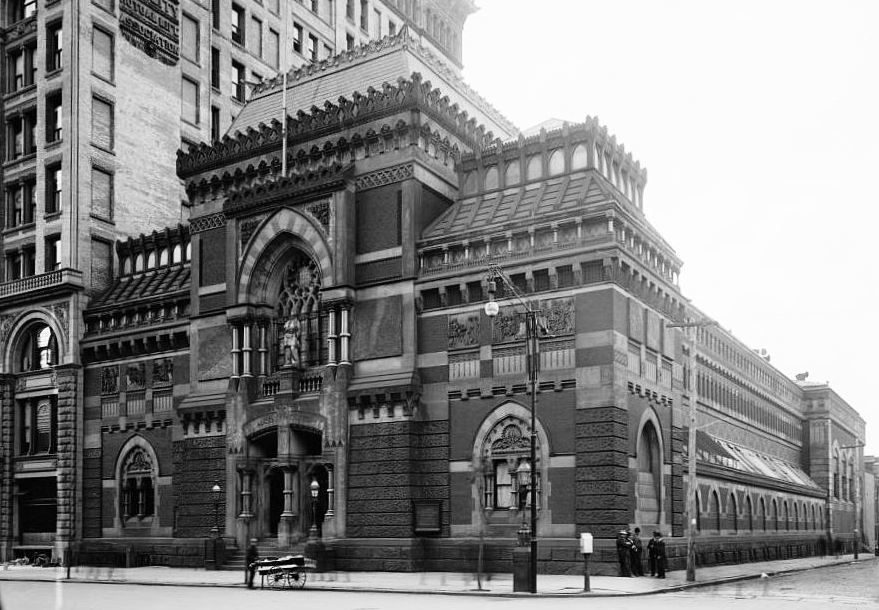
PAFA Building, 1900

The Pennsylvania Academy of the Fine Arts played a central role in the society’s visibility and growth. Starting in 1906, the Academy served as the primary venue for PSMP exhibitions. Its support provided both exhibition space and critical institutional affiliation. By 1909, PSMP's annual exhibitions were shown alongside PAFA’s Water Color Exhibition, and in 1913, the exhibitions began to appear in a shared catalogue.

== Legacy and Archival Records ==
The Pennsylvania Society of Miniature Painters continued its exhibitions until 1951. Archival materials related to the society, including catalogues, correspondence, and organizational records, are preserved at institutions such as the Archives of American Art and the Pennsylvania Academy of the Fine Arts Library.
