= Theodora Thayer =

American painter

Theodora Thayer (1868-1905) was an American painter best known for her miniatures.

She studied with Joseph DeCamp in Boston.

Thayer taught at the New York School of Art and the Art Students League and was a founding member of the American Society of Miniature Painters.

“Her fine portrait of Bliss Carman is considered one of the memorable achievements in American miniature painting.”

== Works ==
Thayer's works can be found in collections at:

- Swarthmore College, Swarthmore, Pennsylvania
- Metropolitan Museum of Art, New York, New York
- Cincinnati Art Museum, Cincinnati, Ohio
- Museum of Fine Arts, Boston, Massachusetts
- Harvard University, Law School, Cambridge, Massachusetts
