= Cox College =

Cox College can mean:

- Cox College (Georgia), a private women's college located in College Park, Georgia that operated from 1842 to 1934
- Cox College (Missouri), a private college associated with the CoxHealth System in Springfield, Missouri
