= Caravan (travellers) =

Group of people or animals traveling together in a row

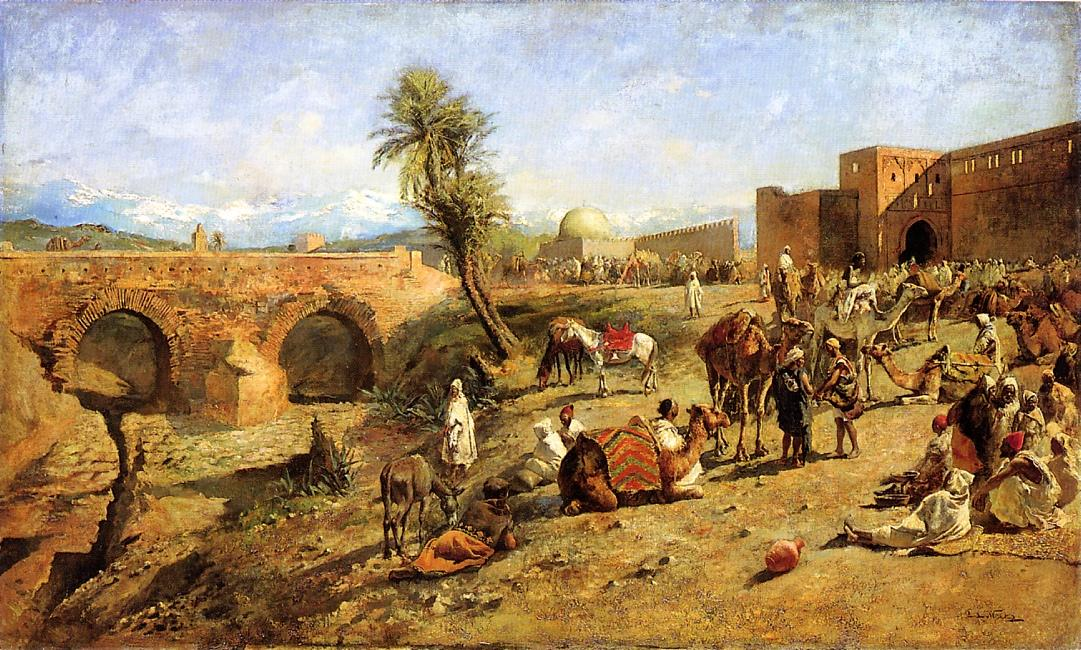
Edwin Lord Weeks, Arrival of a Caravan Outside the City of Morocco

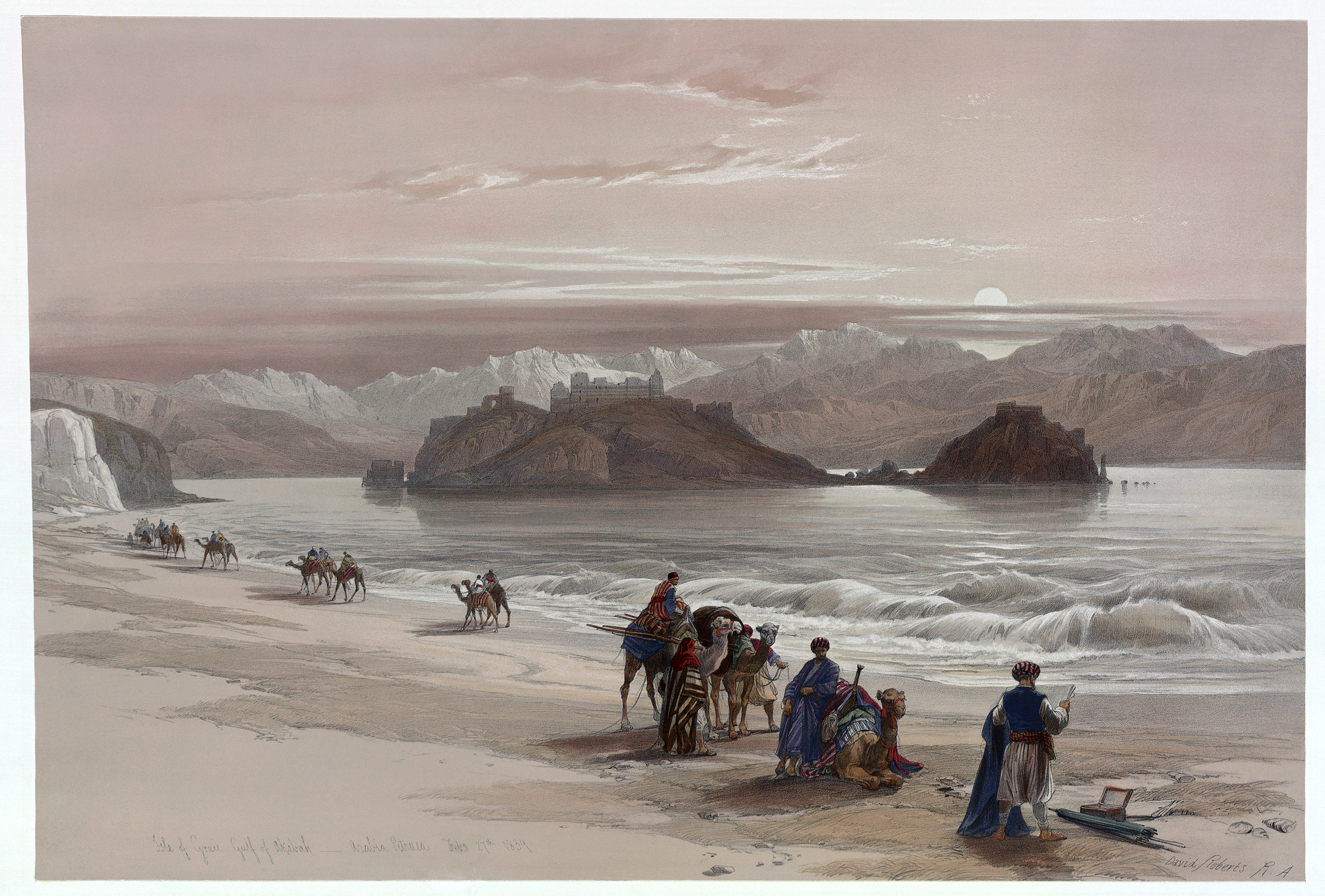
A trade caravan passing the Isle of Graia in the Gulf of Akabah, Arabia Petraea,1839 lithograph by Louis Haghe from an original by David Roberts

Camel caravan in Morocco, November 2013

A caravan (from Persian کاروان kârvân) is a group of people traveling together, often on a trade expedition. Caravans were used mainly in desert areas and throughout the Silk Road, where traveling in groups helped in defense against bandits as well as in improving economies of scale in trade.

== Description ==
Historically, caravans connecting East Asia and Europe often carried luxurious and lucrative goods, such as silks or jewelry. Caravans could therefore require considerable investment and were a lucrative target for bandits. The profits from a successful journey could be significant, comparable to those generated by later European spice trade. The luxurious goods brought by caravans attracted many rulers along important trade routes to construct caravanserais. These were roadside stations which supported the flow of commerce, information, and people across the network of trade routes covering Asia, North Africa, and southeastern Europe, and in particular along the Silk Road. Caravanserais provided water for human and animal consumption, for washing, and for ritual ablutions. They kept fodder for animals and had shops for travelers where they could acquire new supplies. Some shops bought goods from the traveling merchants.

Some of the first caravans on the Silk Road were sent out by Emperor Wu of Han in the 2nd century BCE, when this vast network of roads was 'born' and as China began exporting large quantities of silk and other goods west, particularly destined for the Roman Empire.

However, the volume a caravan could transport was limited even by Classical or Medieval standards. For example, a caravan of 500 camels could only transport as much as a third or half of the goods carried by a regular Byzantine merchant sailing ship.

Present-day caravans in less-developed areas of the world often still transport important goods through badly passable areas, such as seeds required for agriculture in arid regions. An example are the camel trains traversing the southern edges of the Sahara Desert.

== See also ==
- Central American migrant caravans of 2017–22
- Convoy
- Wagon train
