= Lucy May Stanton =

American painter (1875–1931)

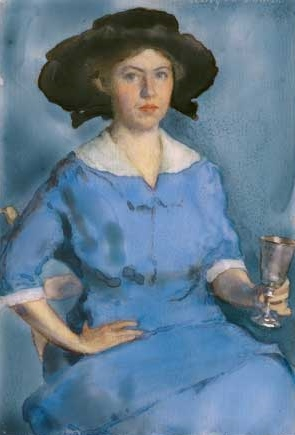
- Self-portrait, 1912, National Portrait Gallery
- Born: May 22, 1875; Atlanta, Georgia
- Died: March 19, 1931 (aged 55); Athens, Georgia
- Awards: Société Nationale des Beaux-Arts Blue Ribbon 1906 Mother and Child; Pennsylvania Society of Miniature Painters Medal of Honor 1917 Joel Chandler Harris; Concord Art Association Medal of Honor 1923

Lucy May Stanton (May 22, 1875 – March 19, 1931) was an American painter. She made landscapes, still lifes, and portraits, but Stanton is best known for the portrait miniatures she painted. Her works are in the National Portrait Gallery in Washington, D.C., Metropolitan Museum of Art in New York, the Museum of Fine Arts in Boston, and the Philadelphia Museum of Art, where Self-Portrait in the Garden (1928) and Miss Jule (1926) are part of the museum's permanent collection.

== Early life ==
Stanton was born in Atlanta, Georgia, the first of two daughters of William Lewis Stanton and Frances Louisa Cleveland Megee Stanton. (Note: Both of her parents came from successful farming families from North Georgia who did not own slaves. During the Civil War, William Stanton was a sergeant under General Joseph Wheeler in the Fourth Georgia Cavalry. Three weeks after Robert. E. Lee's surrender, William and Frances were married The Stantons moved with other citizens of Georgia to British Honduras during the Reconstruction Era following the Civil War. They had two sons who both died there. In 1870 or 1871, William and Frances returned to Georgia.) William had a wholesale business selling food, some of which came from the Stanton and Megee farms; machinery; lumber; and imported pottery from Europe. The family lived in the "fashionable" West End district of Atlanta on Gordon Street (now Ralph D. Abernathy Boulevard) in a Greek Revival house. A year after Lucy May Stanton was born, her sister Willie Marion Stanton was born. The family's summers were often spent in the mountains of North Georgia at Lucy's grandparent's farms. The Stantons spent many winters in the Pontalba Buildings of New Orleans, where William managed the import of Caribbean sugar, molasses, and rice. Lucy May Stanton was given a set of oil paints and began to learn to paint when she was seven years old. Mme Sally Seago, (Note: The Hellers state that the instructor's surname was Seato) a French artist in New Orleans, gave Stanton lessons in New Orleans.

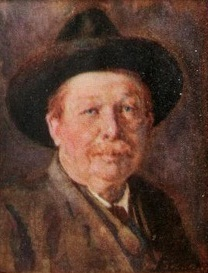
Joel Chandler Harris, c. 1914, watercolor on ivory, National Portrait Gallery, Smithsonian Institution

In Atlanta, she lived across the street from Wren's Nest, the home of author and journalist Joel Chandler Harris, who wrote the Uncle Remus stories and shared his stories with her and her sister, Willie Marion Stanton. Her mother, Frances Megee Stanton, died in 1888. In 1889–1890 she took a tour of Europe with her father and studied watercolor painting in Venice.

== Education and early career ==
Lucy and Willie were educated at the Southern Female College (now known as Cox College) in LaGrange, Georgia where Lucy graduated in 1893 with the highest honors in Greek and Latin. (Note: The Hellers state in North American Women Artists of the Twentieth Century that Stanton graduated in 1895 from the Southern Baptist College for Women in Walnut Ridge, Arkansas, but there is no one else that corroborates that information. Instead, Lucy's father, William Lewis Stanton, began construction in 1892 of the Southern Baptist College for Women in College Park, Georgia but the plans fell through and the school's charter went to Southern Female College in College Park where Lucy May Stranton graduated in 1893.) She studied with another female French teacher, Mme Ada Autrie. Her father married Sallie Cox, a music instructor and member of the family that owned the school. Lucy's early miniature portraits were ones made of her sister in 1895 and another that was a copy of a family miniature. Her early miniatures were made with a stippling technique.

In the two years following her graduation she worked as an art teacher at New Ebenezer College and as an assistant to Atlanta artist James P. Field who had been her art instructor at Southern Female College. During that time she began painting portrait miniatures, receiving her first commission in 1896, a portrait of the opera singer Adelina Patti. Later that year, she left for Paris where she studied painting, etching, and sculpture with the American-born artist Augustus Koopman and miniature painting with American artist, Virginia Richmond Reynolds. Stanton painted in Normandy in the summers with Koopman and other students. Koopman taught her to paint with originality and Reynolds introduced Stanton to parallel brush strokes, a new technique at the time. She also studied anatomy at the Sorbonne; took classes at two independent art schools in Paris which admitted women, the Académie de la Grande Chaumière and the Académie Colarossi; and studied with James Abbott McNeill Whistler.

== Career ==
Stanton, who grew up in Atlanta during its recovery from the Civil War, created works of art that represented her southern heritage, including a set of scenes of African American life that she called her "Little Murals" series, that included Loading Cotton, Negroes Resting, and Aunt Liza's Porch. She exhibited the first miniature portrait of an African American in an 1899 Pennsylvania Academy of the Fine Arts exhibition. She also painted portraits of the Georgian Howell Cobb, who was Speaker of the House of Representatives, and Linton Ingraham who was an ex-slave, which are in the collections of the United States House of Representatives and the Museum of American Trade in Milton, Massachusetts, respectively. Her painting North Carolina Mountain Woman is in the collection of the Metropolitan Museum of Art in New York City.

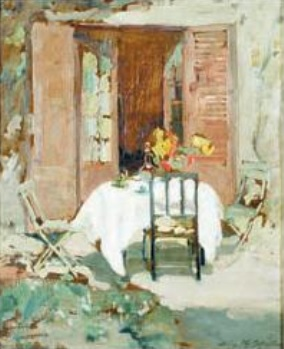
A Paris Garden, 1906. Stanton's Paris residence.

She returned to the United States in 1898 and began her career as an artist in earnest, exhibiting both there and in Europe. She taught at a YMCA night school, gave private lessons, and had a studio in Atlanta. In 1898 she made her first painting of an African American, Aunt Nicey Tuller. She received commissions to paint portraits of influential people, including Charles A. Collier, who had been the mayor of Atlanta. It hangs in the Atlanta City Hall. She taught again at what is now Cox College. Between 1901 and 1902, Stanton and her sister, Willie Marion, (Note: In 1902, Willie Marion married Walter Tillou Forbes II and they settled in Athens, Georgia.) lived in Bryant Park Studios, across from Bryant Park. Lucy gave private art lessons and at the Episcopal Deaconess Hospital trained as a practical charity nurse. Stanton met naturalist John Burroughs, took canoe trips to Maine, and visited friends in Boston, where in 1902 she exhibited in the second annual Copley Society of Art exhibition. More than 800 paintings were rejected by exhibition jurors for the show.

Stanton had an extended visit to her father, stepmother, and her children in Los Angeles beginning in the Spring of 1904. In 1905 she traveled to Paris with her friend and fellow artist Polly Smith. She had a studio at 70 Rue Notre-Dame des Champs in Paris, where she had returned to study portrait painting with Lucien Simon and Jacques-Émile Blanche. Her Mother and Child, a miniature portrait of her sister and nephew painted in 1905, won a Blue Ribbon the following year when it was exhibited at the New Salon of the Société Nationale des Beaux-Arts. From 1909, she maintained a studio and a small house in Athens, Georgia, near the home of her sister. She then had studios in North Carolina in the Great Smoky Mountains and then in New York.

From 1916 to 1926 she lived and worked primarily in Boston, at the time a center of miniaturist art. She had a studio on Beacon Hill and spent her summers in Ogunquit, Maine. She made a watercolor portrait of Joel Chandler Harris about 1914, after he had died. In 1917 it won the Pennsylvania Society of Miniature Painters' Medal of Honor. She also taught art in several private schools there including Milton Academy and Dana Hall. Stanton settled permanently in Athens in 1926 where she was active in the civic life of the city, lecturing on art and organizing exhibitions as well as promoting women's suffrage and campaigning for the League of Nations. She was a co-founder of the Georgia Peace Society in 1928.

Stanton caught a chill in March 1931 and subsequently died of pneumonia in an Athens hospital and was buried in the city's Oconee Hill Cemetery. She never married.

Her papers, correspondence, photographs of family members and her works, and other relevant documents spanning from 1899 to 1931 are held at the Hargrett Rare Book & Manuscript Library of the University of Georgia.

== Exhibitions ==
Some of her major exhibitions are:

- 1899 to 1931 – Pennsylvania Society of Miniature Painters, more than 100 miniatures
- 1899 to 1931 – Pennsylvania Academy of the Fine Arts, 93 works of art, mostly miniatures
- 1906, 1912 – Société Nationale des Beaux-Arts, Paris, where she won a Blue Ribbon
- 1910, 1920, 1926 – American Society of Miniature Painters
- 1913 – United States Capitol Building
- 1913–1915, 1922 – Art Institute of Chicago
- 1914 – Royal Society of Miniatures, London
- 1915 – Panama Pacific Exposition, San Francisco
- 1919, 1921 – Washington Water Color Club
- 1923 – Concord Art Association, Massachusetts, where she won a Medal of Honor

She also had solo exhibitions in Boston, New York, New Orleans, and Baltimore.

== Collections ==
Title	Image	Year	Medium	Collection
Self Portrait in a Navy Dress		Before 1898	oil on canvas	Robert W. Woodruff Library, Emory University, Atlanta, Georgia
Aunt Nicey Tuller		1898	watercolor on ivory	Museum of Fine Arts, Boston, Massachusetts
Maine Guide or Backwoodsman from Maine		1901	watercolor on ivory	Robert W. Woodruff Library, Emory University, Atlanta, Georgia
Corrine Stanton		1902	watercolor	Private collection, Corrine Stanton Henry
Dutch Girl		1905	watercolor on ivory	Georgia Museum of Art, University of Georgia, Athens
Joel Chandler Harris		1906	watercolor on ivory	Robert W. Woodruff Library, Emory University, Atlanta, Georgia
Self Portrait with Frances Forbes		1906	watercolor on ivory	Georgia Museum of Art, University of Georgia
Aunt Liza		1908	watercolor on ivory	Concord Art Association, Massachusetts
Maternité (Mrs. W.T. Forbes and Children)		1908	watercolor on ivory	Museum of Fine Arts, Boston, Massachusetts
Howell Cobb		1912		United States House of Representatives, Washington, D.C.
Self-portrait or The Silver Goblet		1912	watercolor on ivory	National Portrait Gallery, Smithsonian Institution, Washington, D.C.
Joel Chandler Harris		c. 1914	watercolor on ivory	National Portrait Gallery, Smithsonian Institution, Washington, D.C.
Self Portrait, Reading		1914	oil on canvas	Georgia Museum of Art, University of Georgia
A North Carolina Mountain Woman		c. 1916	watercolor on ivory	Metropolitan Museum of Art, New York
Uncle George		1916	watercolor on ivory	Robert W. Woodruff Library, Emory University, Atlanta, Georgia
Aunt Liza's Porch		1921	watercolor on ivory	Robert W. Woodruff Library, Emory University, Atlanta, Georgia
Resting or Negroes Resting		1921	watercolor on ivory	Robert W. Woodruff Library, Emory University, Atlanta, Georgia
Shovelling or Negroes Shovelling		1921	watercolor on ivory	Robert W. Woodruff Library, Emory University, Atlanta, Georgia
Working on the Street		1921	watercolor on ivory	Robert W. Woodruff Library, Emory University, Atlanta, Georgia
Chloe		1922–1923	watercolor on ivory	Robert W. Woodruff Library, Emory University, Atlanta, Georgia
Self Portrait in Blue, Grey, and Purple		1923	watercolor on ivory	Robert W. Woodruff Library, Emory University, Atlanta, Georgia
Chum Wee		1925	watercolor on ivory	Lepore Fine Arts, Newburyport, Massachusetts
Linton Ingrahm, Ex-Slave		1925	watercolor on ivory	Museum of the American China Trade, Milton, Massachusetts
Elizabeth Wentworth Roberts		1925	watercolor on ivory	Concord Art Association, Massachusetts
Miss Jule Moss		1926	watercolor on ivory	Philadelphia Museum of Art, Pennsylvania
Self-Portrait in the Garden		1928		Philadelphia Museum of Art, Pennsylvania
Negro Boy		1928	watercolor on ivory	Robert W. Woodruff Library, Emory University, Atlanta, Georgia
Aunt Maria		Late 1920s	watercolor on ivory	Robert W. Woodruff Library, Emory University, Atlanta, Georgia
Major Charles Collier			oil	City Hall, City of Atlanta, Georgia
Easter Bouquet			watercolor on ivory	Georgia Museum of Art, University of Georgia
English Girl			watercolor on ivory	Georgia Museum of Art, University of Georgia
Mrs. Jenkins, A North Carolina Mountain Woman			watercolor on ivory	Berea College, Kentucky
Paris Model in Brown Shawl			watercolor on ivory	Robert W. Woodruff Library, Emory University, Atlanta, Georgia
Chancellor Snelling			oil	University of Georgia, Athens
