= Concord Art Association =

Concord Center for the Visual Arts; AKA Concord Art Association
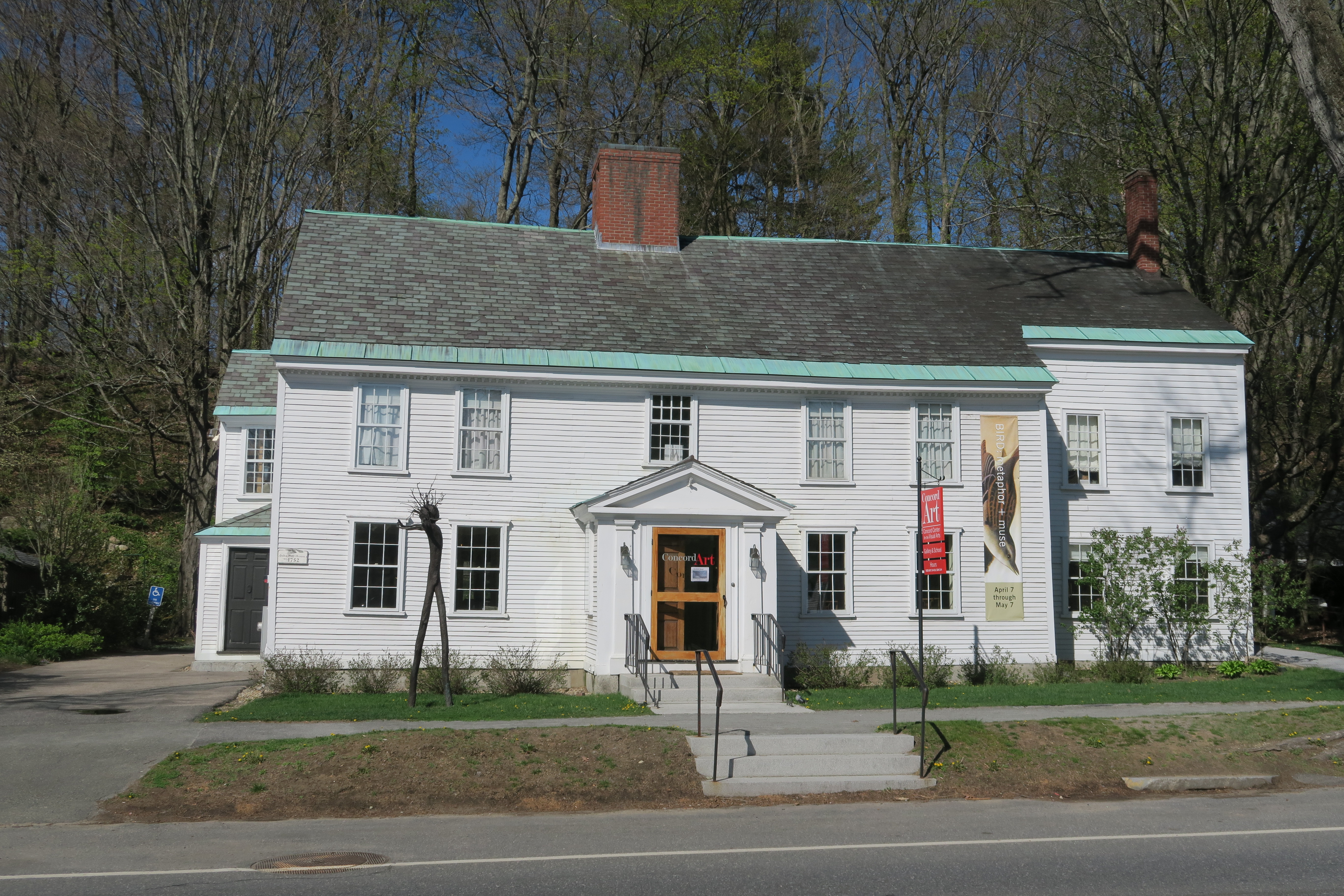
- Former name: Concord Art Centre
- Established: 1917
- Location: 37 Lexington Avenue, Concord, Massachusetts
- Coordinates: 42°27′35.8″N 71°20′50.5″W
- Type: Art museum
- Founder: Elizabeth Wentworth Roberts
- Website: www.concordart.org

Concord Art Association is a membership-based arts center in Concord, Massachusetts that conducts exhibits, lectures, classes, and tours. It was founded in 1917 by Elizabeth Wentworth Roberts and moved into its permanent location, the former John Ball House, in 1923. It has exhibited works of noted artists, such as Claude Monet, Mary Cassatt, John Singer Sargent, and Cecilia Beaux. Its current artist members work in a wide range of media.

== History ==
The Concord Art Association was founded in 1917 by Elizabeth Wentworth Roberts. It is located within the John Ball House, built in 1753 or 1761, and on a site that was built in 1657. The house was an overnight stop on the Underground Railroad.

Roberts purchased the John Ball House next to the town center in 1922 and hired architect Lois Howe to remodel the residential building into the Concord Art Centre. Galleries were positioned on the first floor and the upper floors became open exhibition space. A sky-light was installed to provide natural light for the gallery. The steel reinforced building was completed in 1923. The grand opening was held on May 6, 1923, with sixty painters and eighteen sculptors from Europe and the United States in attendance. Among the noted artists were Claude Monet, Robert Henri, Mary Cassatt, and John Singer Sargent. It has exhibited the works of Mary Cassatt, Claude Monet, Cecilia Beaux, Rockwell Kent, John Singer Sargent, Daniel Chester French, and Childe Hassam.

In 1924, Concord Art Association inaugurated the bronze Medal of Honor, with an eagle on one side and a pine cone on the other, for meritorious works of art.

Mary Ogden Abbott was the president from 1942 to 1971. She was the granddaughter of Charles Francis Adams Jr.

== Overview ==
Concard Art Association holds up to 25 annual exhibits and conducts classes, lectures, and tours. It is a non-profit, membership-based organization. Its members include students, professionals, and educators who work in a variety of media. Supporters of the arts are also members of Concord Art.
