= Mary Ogden Abbott =

American artist and woodworker (1894–1981)

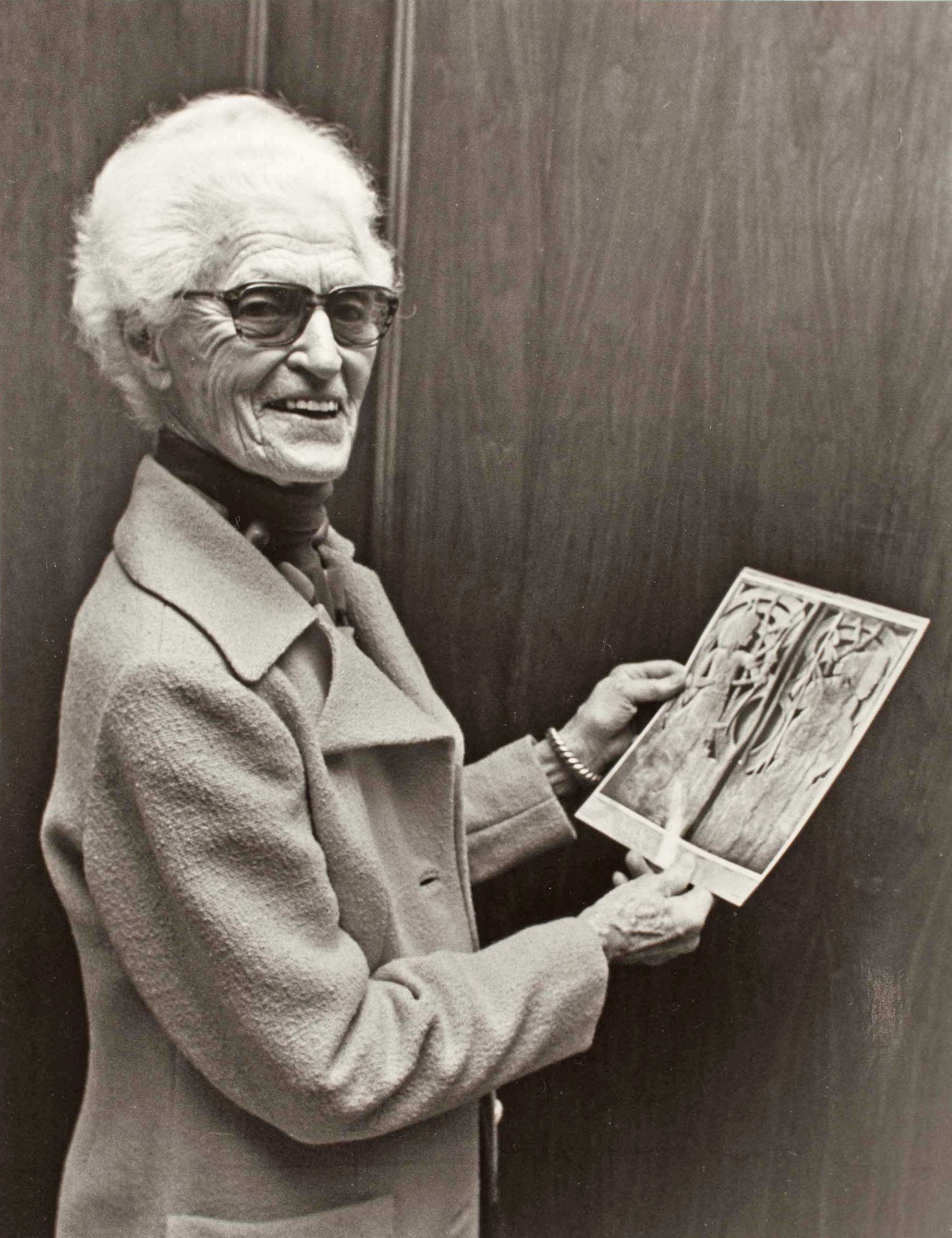
- Abbott visits the Department of Interior, 1974
- Born: October 12, 1894; Concord, Massachusetts, US
- Died: May 11, 1981 (aged 86); Concord, Massachusetts, US
- Education: School of the Museum of Fine Arts at Tufts
- Relatives: Charles Francis Adams Jr. (grandfather); Josiah Gardner Abbott (grandfather); Thomas B. Adams (cousin)

Mary Ogden Abbott (October 12, 1894 – May 11, 1981) was an American wood carving and line drawing artist, world traveler, equestrian and an early Grand Canyon River runner.

== Early life ==
Mary Ogden Abbott was born in Concord, Massachusetts on October 12, 1894. She was the daughter of Grafton St. Loe Abbott and Mary Ogden (née Adams) Abbott.

On her mother's side, she was a granddaughter of Charles Francis Adams Jr. and was a descendant of Presidents John Adams and John Quincy Adams. On her father's side, she was a granddaughter of U.S. Representative Josiah Gardner Abbott and was a descendant of George Abbott, one of the early settlers in Andover, Massachusetts.

Mary attended the Westover School in Connecticut and the School of the Museum of Fine Arts at Tufts in Boston, Mass.

== Explorations ==
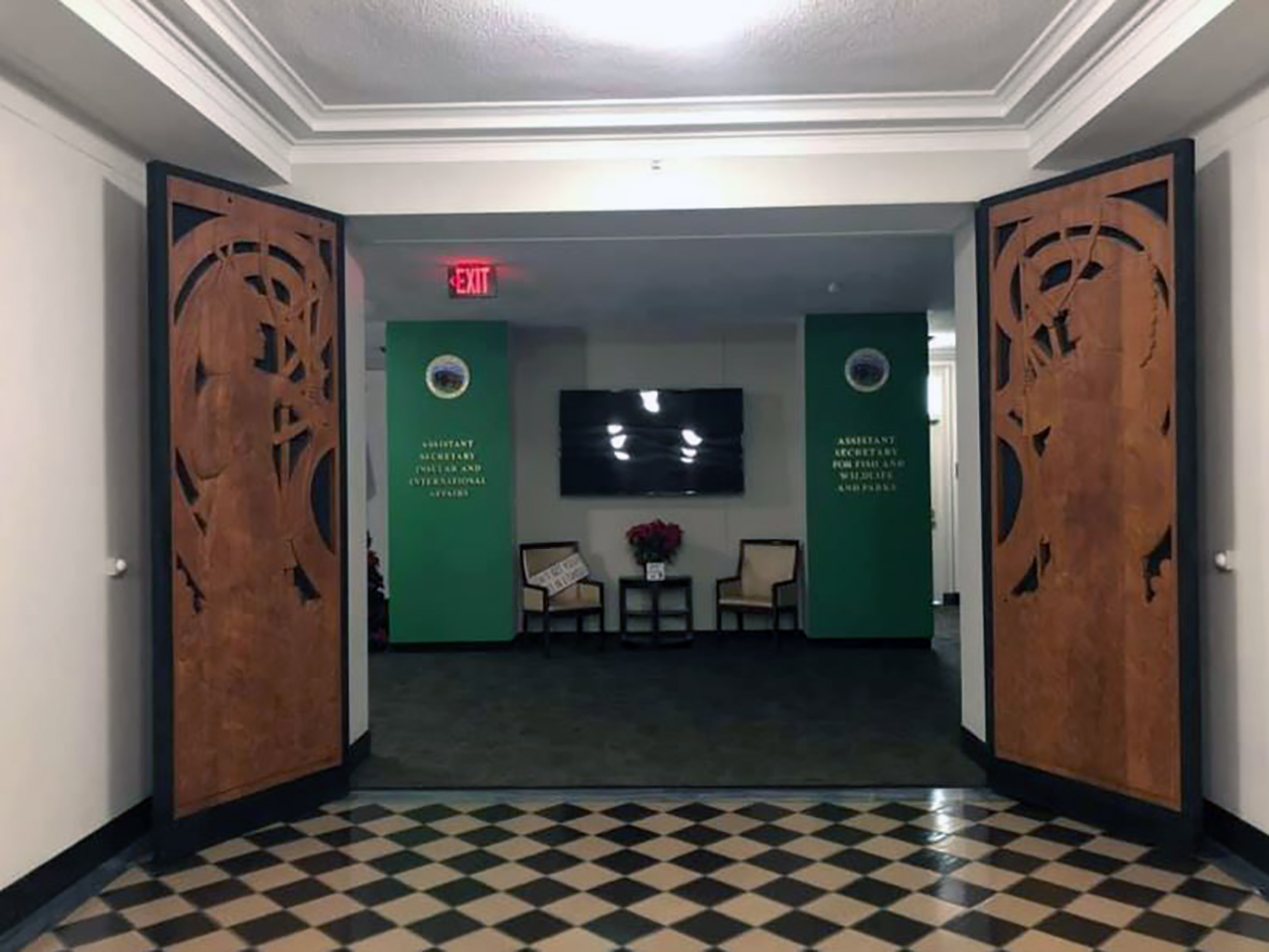
Mary Ogden Abbott carved these two teak doors. They were installed in the Stewart Lee Udall Department of the Interior Building in Washington, DC, in 1976. They flanked the entrance to the National Park Service (NPS) Director's 3100 corridor. In 2018, the NPS was instructed to move out of that corridor to make way for the Assistant Secretary for Insular and International Affairs - the doors, however, remained.

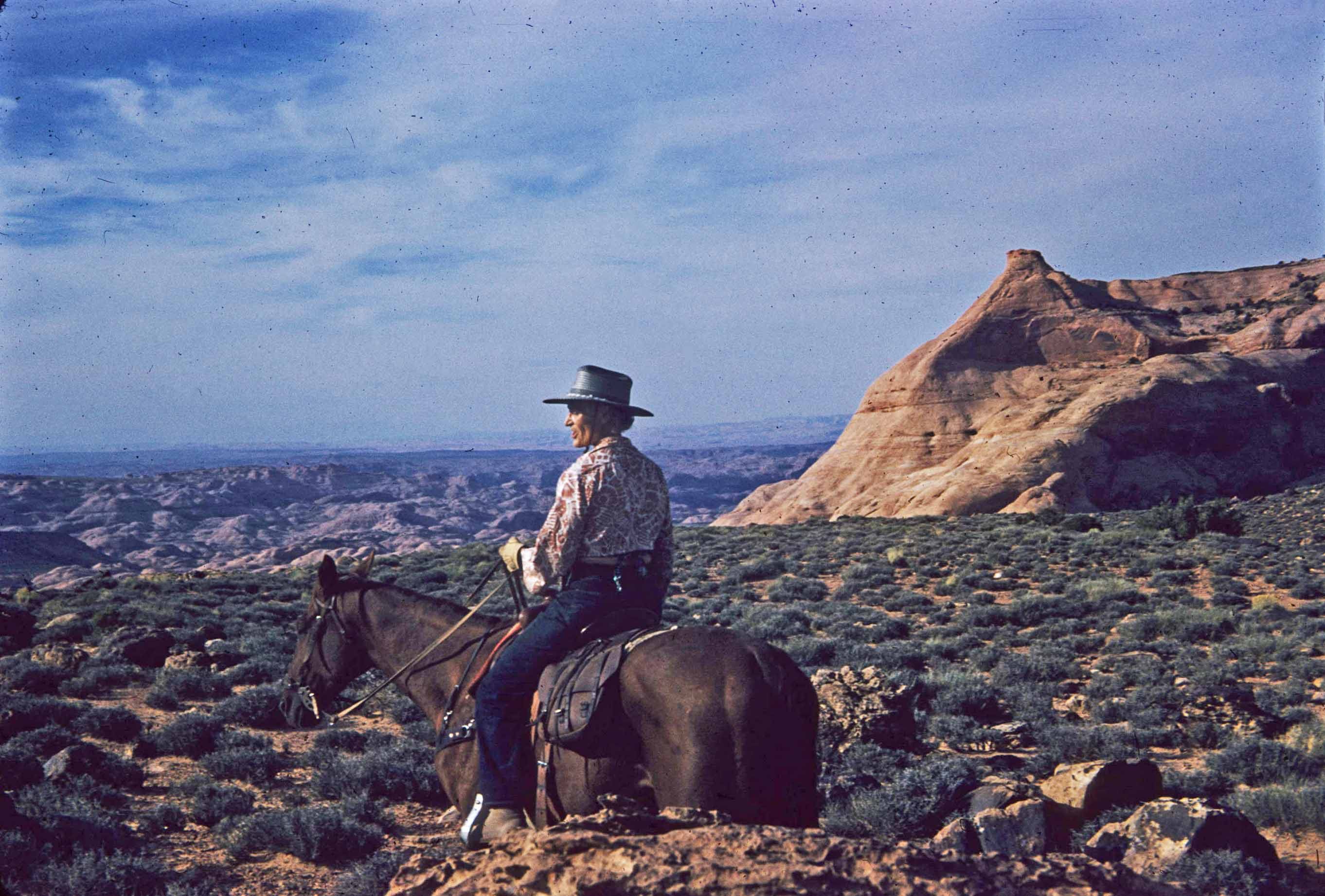
In September, 1957, Mary Ogden Abbott explored Glen Canyon by horse.

In 1920, Mary and her mother, Mary Adams Abbott, drove across the United States. That winter, the two women lived on the Arizona Strip at Ryan, Arizona. In the spring of 1921, Mary rode packstock across the Grand Canyon, crossing the Colorado River on a temporary suspension bridge near where the Black Suspension Bridge exists today. That same year the two women rode packstock from the Arizona Strip to the Bitterroot Valley of Montana.

From 1922 to 1927, the two women traveled to Java, Singapore, Hong Kong, Baghdad, Jerusalem, rode across Peloponnese on horseback, and made their way by automobile through Europe. These travels were recorded in journals and letters. Mary Ogden Abbott wrote her recollections of these adventures in the book Shikar in Baltistan, describing their hunting expedition in Baltistan in 1923, and "Improbable Interlude."

In 1948, Abbott made her first boat journey down the San Juan River to Lee's Ferry, Arizona, through Glen Canyon on the Colorado River. In 1949 she floated the Colorado River in Grand Canyon with Norman Nevills from Phantom Ranch to Lake Mead. In 1950, she ran the Colorado River in Grand Canyon from Lee's Ferry, Arizona, to Phantom Ranch, becoming the 114th person to make a complete transit of the Grand Canyon by boat. After the Nevills untimely death in 1949, Abbott designed a plaque to commemorate the lives of Norm and Doris Nevills. The plaque was placed at Navajo Bridge in 1952. Her plaque at Navajo Bridge was moved to its present location east of the visitor center after the new bridge was completed and the visitor area redesigned in 1995. Abbott joined river runner Otis R. Marston, Frank E. Masland, and National Park Service Chief of Interpretation John E. Doerr on a slickrock journey north of Navajo Mountain in September 1957. In 1958, Abbott ran the Grand Canyon again by boat with Marston.

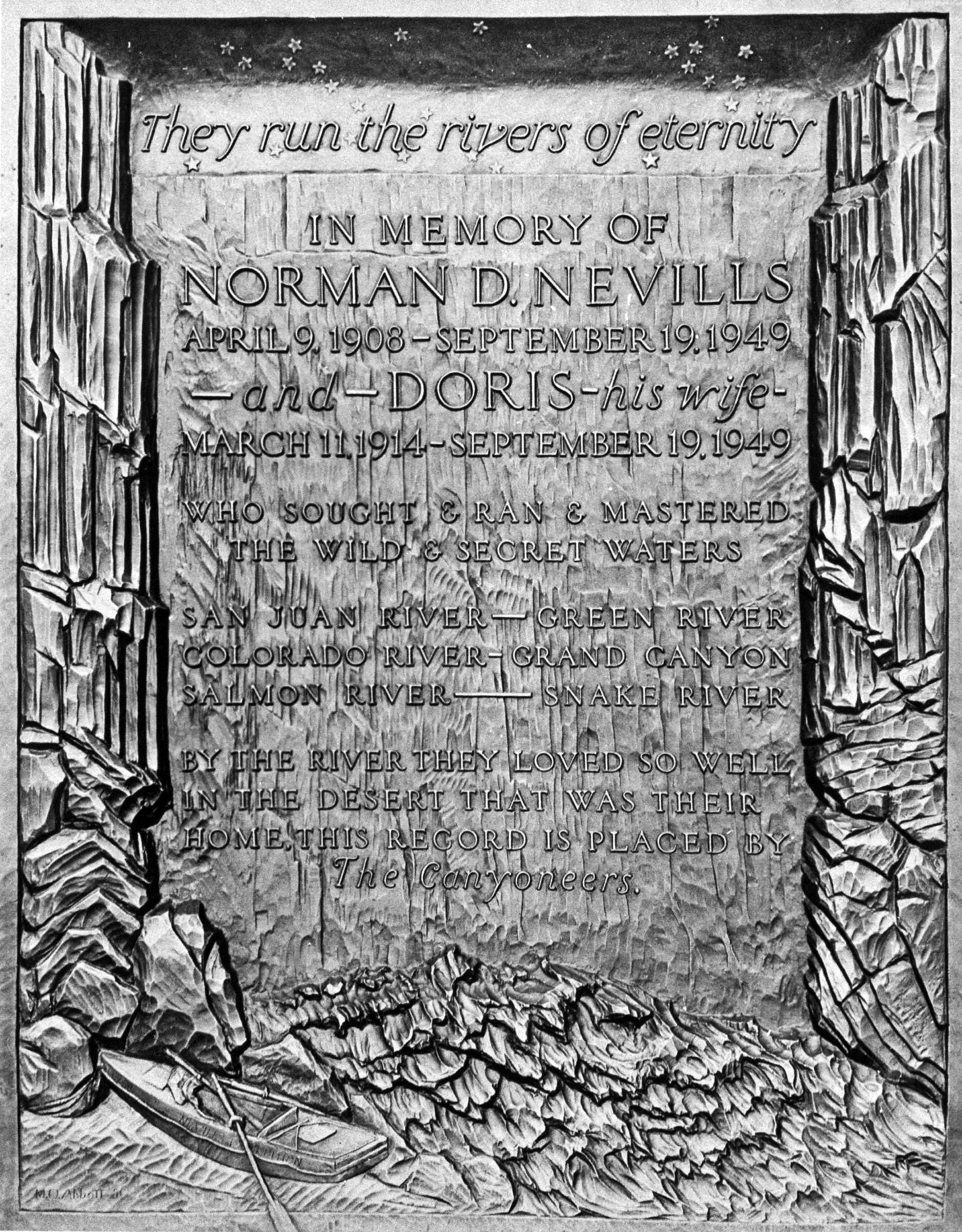
This bronze memorial plaque for Norman and Doris Nevills was cast by Mary Ogden Abbott in 1951. The plaque was installed near the west abutment of Navajo Bridge in 1952, where it has remained to this day.

== Artistry ==
Abbott was an accomplished artist in various media, especially woodcarving. She made the Reredos and altar for the Grace Episcopal Church (Lawrence, Massachusetts), and an altar depicting Saint George in cowboy attire in St. Andrew's Episcopal Church, Nogales, Arizona. Mary carved what she called the "Indian Gates," also known as the "western gates," two side by side teak doors, which were hung in the U.S. Department of the Interior building, Washington, D.C. These doors are always displayed in the open position.

Abbott's drawings appeared in the Appalachian Mountain Club journal Appalachia and books on travel. She was also a founding member of the Concord Art Association and served as its president from 1942 to 1971. Abbott also provided the illustrations for George Cory Franklin's Wild Animals of the Five Rivers Country, published by Houghton Mifflin in 1947. In its review, The New York Times wrote "Mary Abbott's spirited illustrations capture the lithe grace of these wild creatures in many of their tensest moments." Frank E. Masland commissioned Mary to paint a scene from river running in the Colorado river in Grand Canyon. After the painting was completed, Masland donated the painting to Grand Canyon National Park.

As a skilled equestrian, Abbott participated in hunts on the Alexander Higginson estate and with the Middlesex Hunt Club in South Lincoln, Mass. Abbott lived most of her life in Concord, Massachusetts.

== Legacy ==
The Mary Ogden Abbott Papers are preserved at the Massachusetts Historical Society in Boston, Massachusetts.
