= Lella A. Dillard =

American temperance leader (1863–1935)

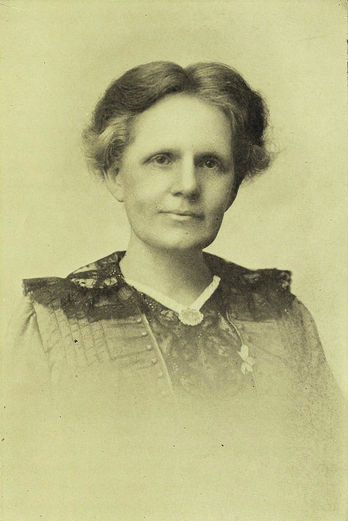
- Born: Eleanor Augusta Jackson; November 10, 1863 near Greenville, Georgia, U.S.
- Died: January 26, 1935 (aged 71); Cochran, Georgia, U.S.
- Resting place: LaGrange, Georgia, U.S.
- Other name: "Lella"
- Education: Southern Female College
- Occupation: temperance movement leader
- Organizations: Woman's Christian Temperance Union
- Spouse: Miles H. Dillard (m. 1886; died 1898)
- Children: 4

Lella A. Dillard (née Jackson; November 10, 1863 – January 26, 1935) was an American temperance leader. She served as president of the Georgia State Woman's Christian Temperance Union (W.C.T.U.), and afterwards as National Director of the W.C.T.U.'s Peace Department.

== Early life and education ==
Eleanor (nickname, "Lella") Augusta Jackson was born near Greenville, Georgia, November 10, 1863. (Note: According to FamilySearch.org, Dillard was born in Meriwether, Georgia.) Joseph Baldwin Jackson (1841-1895) and Margaret Julieka Eleanor (nee Park) Jackson. Dillard had one sister, Theney.

She was educated at the Southern Female College, LaGrange, Georgia (A. B. 1881). Her interest in temperance found expression in her graduation thesis, a temperance poem, for which she received the class medal.

== Career ==
For the next five years she was a teacher in the same institution.

"My connection with the W. C. T. U. was preceded by a distinct spiritual impression that the Lord was leading me into larger service. The impression was so deep as to produce a feeling of awe and so burdened me that I confided the secret to a friend." (Lella A. Dillard, 1914)

In 1892, (Note: According to Dillard's obituary in The Macon News, she participated in the W.C.T.U. since 1890.) while living at Conyers, Georgia, where her husband was pastor of the church, Dillard joined the W.C.T.U. Returning to LaGrange, where she had lived as a student, she was made president of the local W.C.T.U., retaining that office until 1909, when she removed with her family to Oxford, Georgia.

She served in various State offices, first as superintendent of the Literature Department, sending out thousands upon thousands of pages of literature in 1903. In 1906, it was reported that Dillard sowed Georgia down with temperance information, and at each Convention, she was so well informed on the literature which was best adapted to the State needs that her table, laden with all sorts of leaflets, books, and periodicals bearing upon the temperance reform, became the most popular rendezvous with the attendees. Dillard sowed down the dry counties with facts showing how impossible it was to enforce the law against the sale of liquor and keep a healthful public sentiment on prohibition while liquor was so accessible in wet counties.

She next served as the superintendent of the Purity Department before being transferred to the Young People’s Branch and made college secretary the same year.

In 1909, she was made State vice-president of the Georgia W.C.T.U., and in 1916, (Note: In 1916, Dillard reported that in Georgia, over 2,500 students were reached by the work of the temperance committees organized, by temperance books contributed to libraries, and total abstinence pledges secured.) she was chosen president, holding the position till 1924. She brought to this position the many months of experience in the work when her chief had been on a leave of absence through ill-health. In defending the W.C.T.U.'s victories of earlier years, Dillard distinguished herself as an able leader. From at least 1917, Dillard used Emory University as her address.

In 1919, while president of the Georgia W.C.T.U., Dillard was also a columnist for the Georgia Bulletin where she praised efforts being made for women's suffrage.

At the conclusion of World War I, Dillard became the National W.C.T.U.'s peace superintendent, and wrote articles on the topics of disarmament and peace. In 1925, she was listed as Georgia W.C.T.U. Recording Secretary and the National Director of the W.C.T.U.'s Peace Department.

== Personal life ==
In 1886, she married the Rev. Miles Hill Dillard (1851-1898), of the North Georgia Conference, Methodist Episcopal Church, South. They had four children: Annie, Lella, Fielding, and Miles.

Lella Dillard died in Cochran, Georgia, January 26, 1935 and was buried in LaGrange.

== Selected works ==
- "Consciousness of World Citizenship Will Bring World Peace" (July 2, 1925)
- "Seek Justice, Supremacy of Law and Social Harmony in Paths of Peace, President Colidge Urges" (October 24, 1925)
- "Armistice Day Appropriate for Peace and Arbitration Programs" (November 6, 1926)
