= Jama Mosque, Mathura =

Mosque in Mathura, Uttar Pradesh, India

Jama Mosque
- Jama Masjid
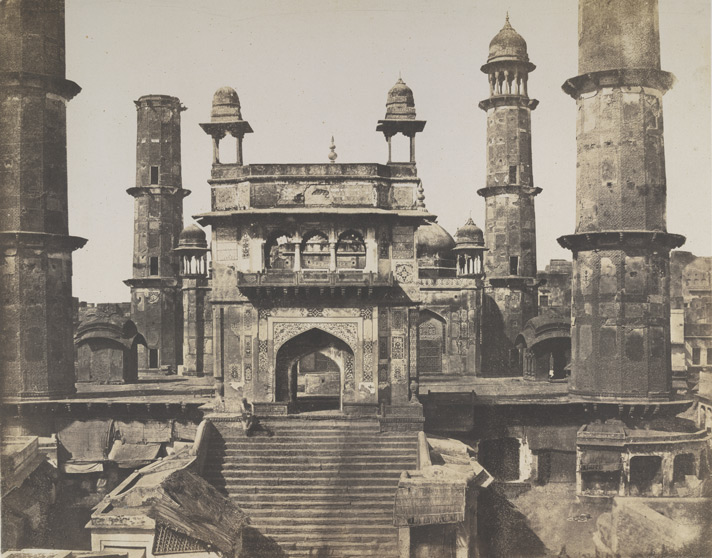
- The Jama Masjid photographed by John Murray, c. 1855.

Religion
- Affiliation: Islam

Location
- Location: Mathura, India
- Interactive map of Jama Mosque
- Coordinates: 27°30′22.68″N 77°40′47.28″E

Architecture
- Type: Jama masjid (congregational mosque)
- Style: Mughal architecture
- Completed: 1661

Specifications
- Dome: 3
- Minaret: 4
- Minaret height: 40 m

The Jama Mosque (Masjid) is a historical 17th-century congregational mosque in Mathura, Uttar Pradesh, India. It was built by Abd-al-Nabi Khan, governor of Mathura during the reign of Mughal Emperor Aurangzeb.

== History ==
The Jama Masjid was commissioned in the period 1660-1661 by Abd-al-Nabi Khan, faujdar of Mathura under Aurangzeb. It was one of the earliest non-imperial structures erected during Aurangzeb's reign.

The ground which Abd-al-Nabi Khan selected as the site of his mosque was purchased from some butchers and the remainder, he obtained from a family of Kazis, whose descendants still occupy what is called Kusk Mahalla, one of the very few quarters of the city that are known by a Persian name. They continued to be regarded as zamindars of the township till the time of Jats. When Saijid Bakir, their head quarreled with the local governor and made over all his rights to Chaubes, and others.

== Architecture ==
The Jama Masjid is located at the centre and highest point of Mathura, raised from the ground by a plinth. It was constructed using red sandstone.

The mosque has four minarets that are each 40 m (132 ft) high. A gateway stands in front of the mosque, featuring tile-work. Within the courtyard is a large ablution pool, as well as several rectangular pavilions. These pavilions feature bangla roofs and ogival archways.

The main prayer hall is smaller in scale than the gateway and minarets. Atop the prayer hall are three bulbous domes, of which the central one is the largest. The hall's facade historically had the ninety-nine names of Allah with Persian inscriptions on either side.
