= Edwin Lord Weeks =

American painter (1849–1903)

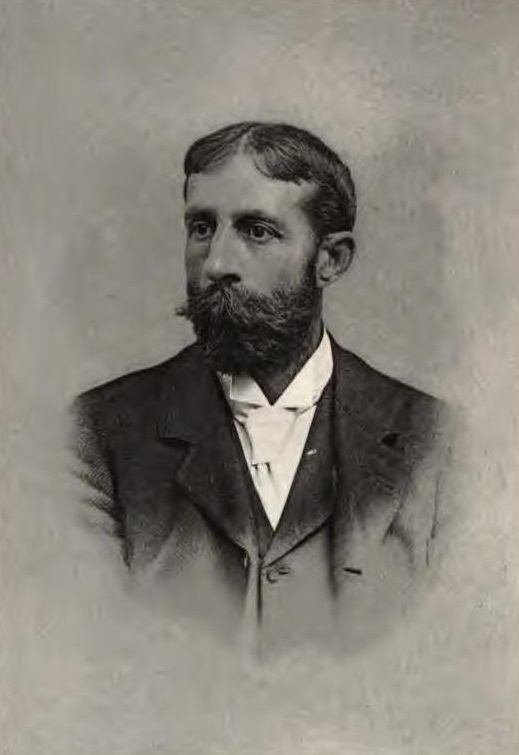
- Born: 1849; Boston, Massachusetts, US
- Died: November 1903 (aged 53–54); Paris, France
- Education: Léon Bonnat and Jean-Léon Gérôme, Paris
- Known for: Painting
- Movement: Orientalist

Edwin Lord Weeks (1849 – November 1903) was an American painter, noted for his Orientalist works.

== Life ==
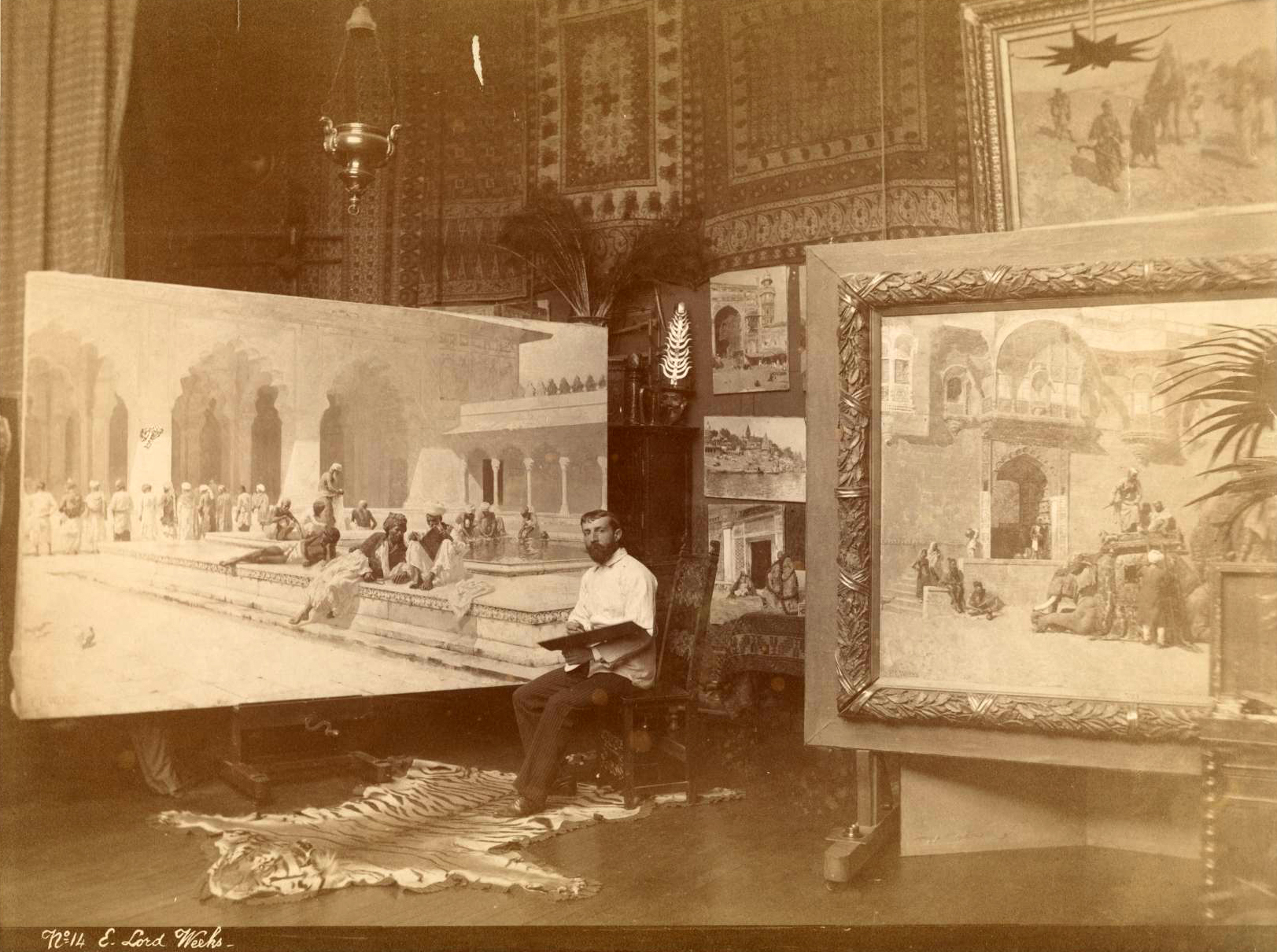
Weeks in his studio.

Weeks was born in Boston, in 1849. His parents were spice and tea merchants from Newton, and as such they were able to finance their son's youthful interest in painting and travelling. As a young man Weeks visited the Florida Keys to draw, and also travelled to Surinam in South America. His earliest known paintings date from 1867 when he was eighteen years old, although it is not until his Landscape with Blue Heron, dated 1871 and painted in the Everglades, that Weeks started to exhibit a dexterity of technique and eye for composition—presumably having taken professional tuition.

In 1872, Weeks relocated to Paris, becoming a pupil of Léon Bonnat and Jean-Léon Gérôme.

After his studies in Paris, Weeks emerged as one of America's major painters of Orientalist subjects. Throughout his adult life he was an inveterate traveler and journeyed to South America (1869), Egypt and Persia (1870), Morocco (frequently between 1872 and 1878), and India (1882–83). During his trip to India, he became the first known American artist to visit the country, where he produced sketches and paintings of daily life and royalty in cities including Benares, Mathura, Agra, Amritsar, and Lahore. He returned to India in 1887 and traveled until 1893, focusing extensively on the princely states of Rajputana and Malwa—such as Bikaner, Jodhpur, Jaisalmer, Udaipur, and Jaipur—which he collectively referred to as the "India of the Rajahs".

In 1895, Weeks wrote and illustrated a book of travels, From the Black Sea through Persia and India, and in 1897 he published Episodes of Mountaineering (which was preceded by the 1894 article Some Episodes of Mountaineering, by a Casual Amateur).

Weeks died in Paris in November 1903. He was a member of the Légion d'honneur, France, an officer of the Order of Saint Michael (Bavaria), and a member of the Munich Secession.

== Achievements ==
Weeks exhibited his work in nearly every annual Salon (Paris). He earned a Medal of Honor in 1884, then a Third Class Medal in 1889, followed by a gold medal at the 1889 International Exhibition, and finally the Legion of Honor in 1896.

== Gallery ==
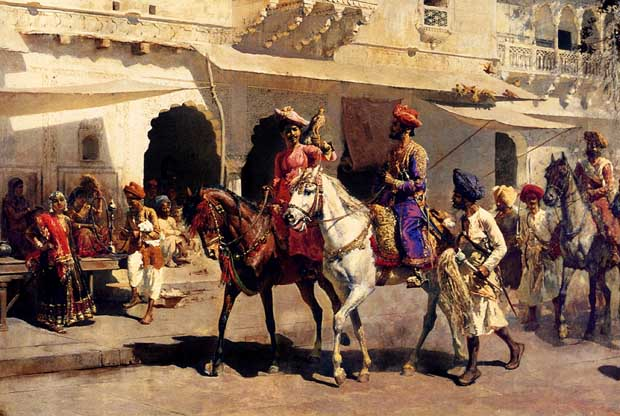
A Maratha, leaving for hunting from Gwalior Fort

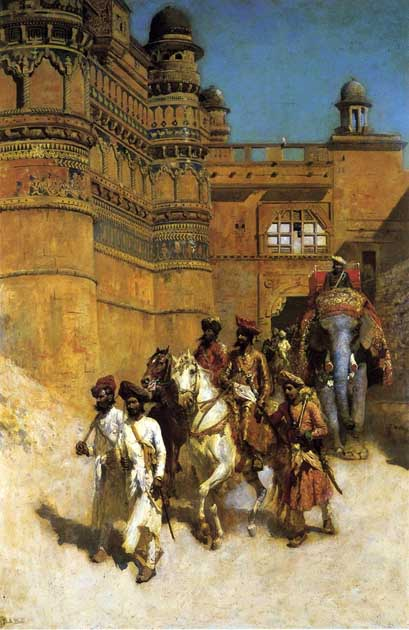
Maratha king of Gwalior at his palace

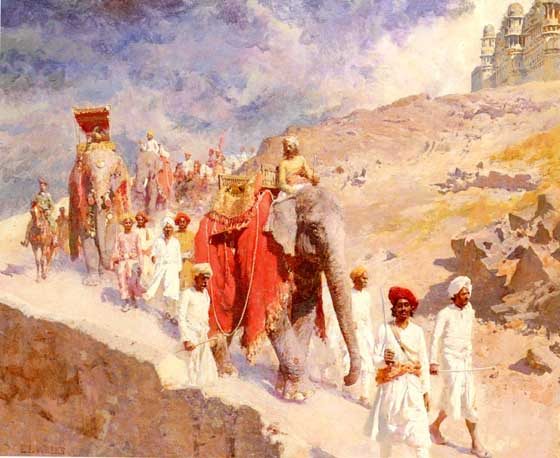
A Maratha hunting party

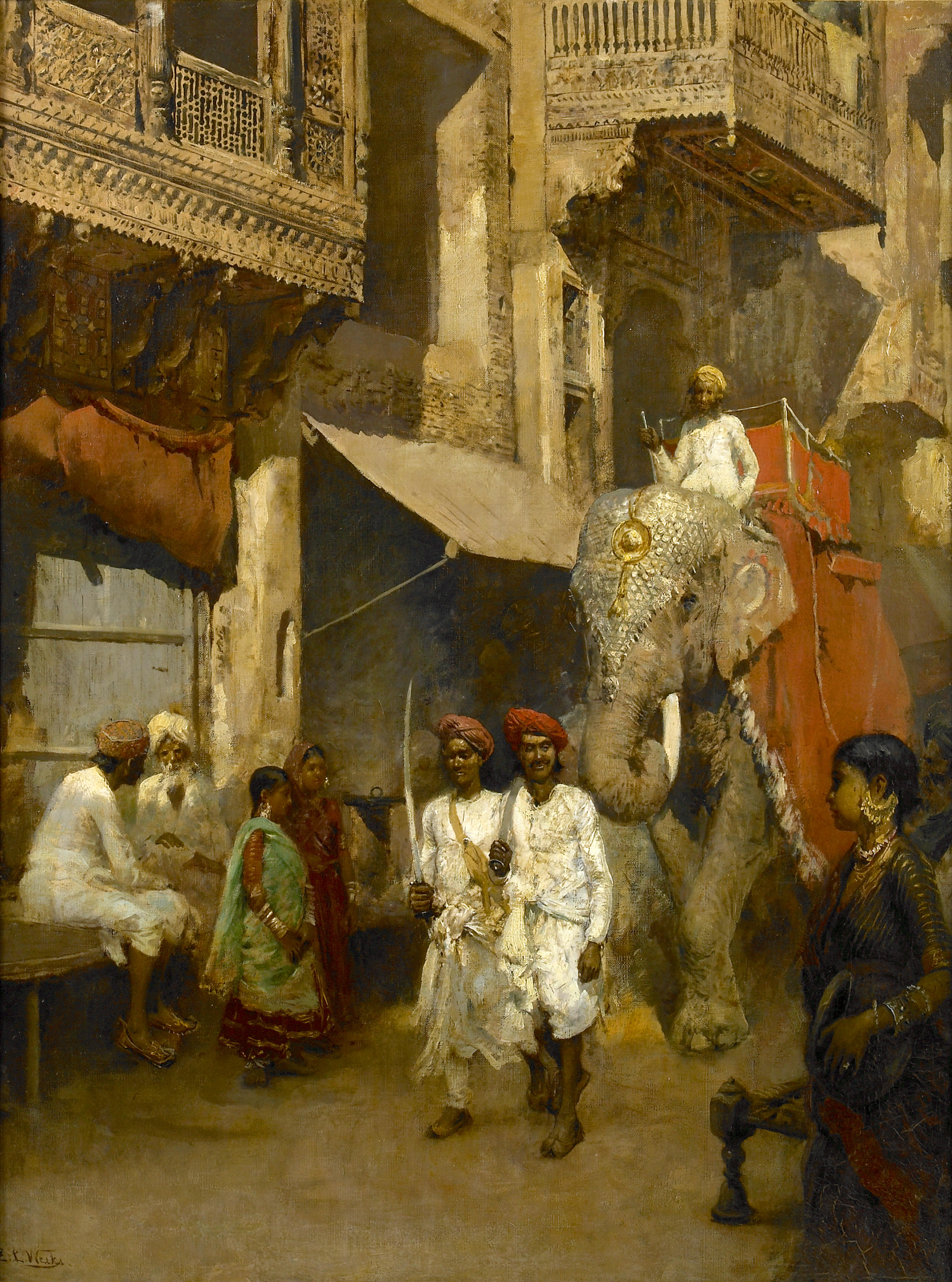
Promenade on a Maratha street

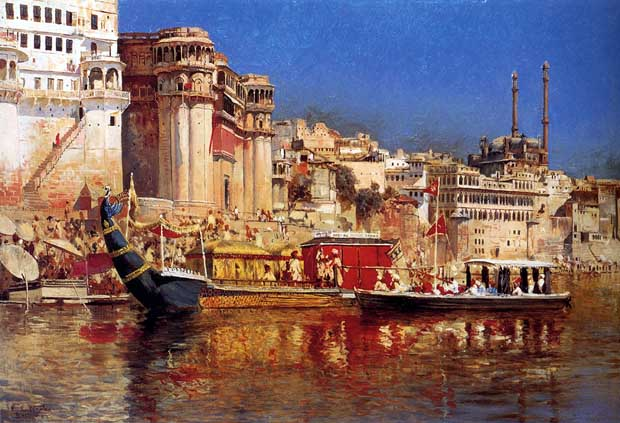
Barge of the Maharaja Of Benares, 1883

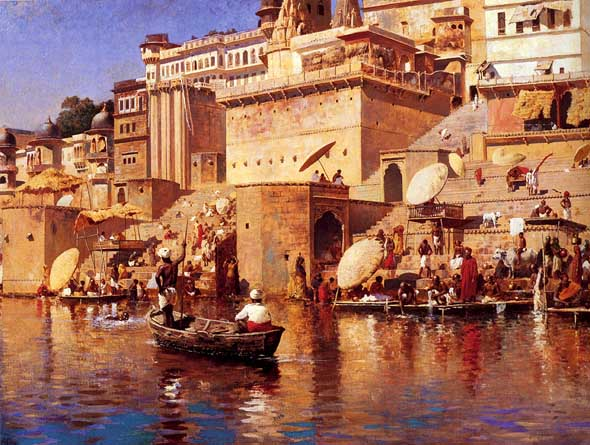
On The River Benares, 1883

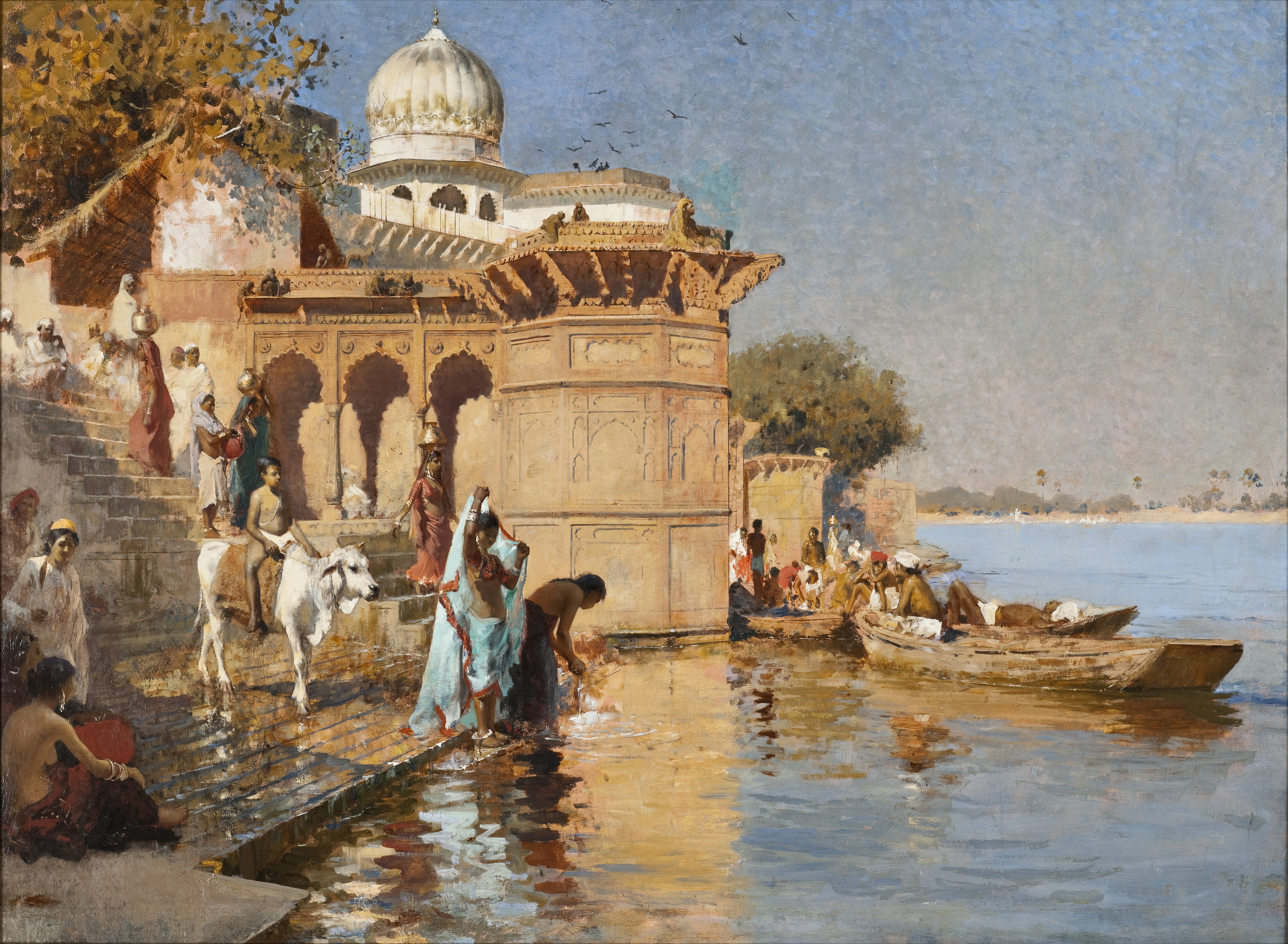
Along the Ghats of Mathura, 1883

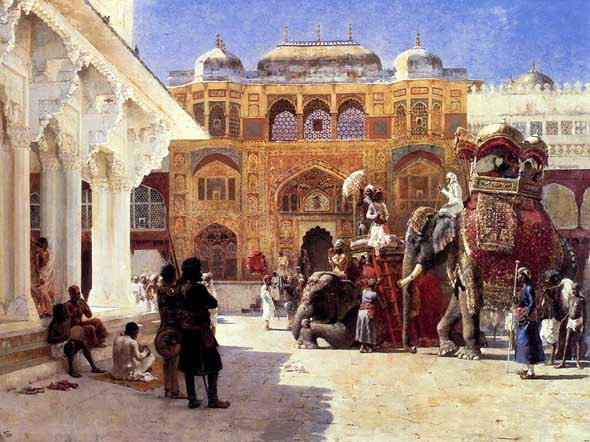
The Maharajah at the Amer Fort, 1888

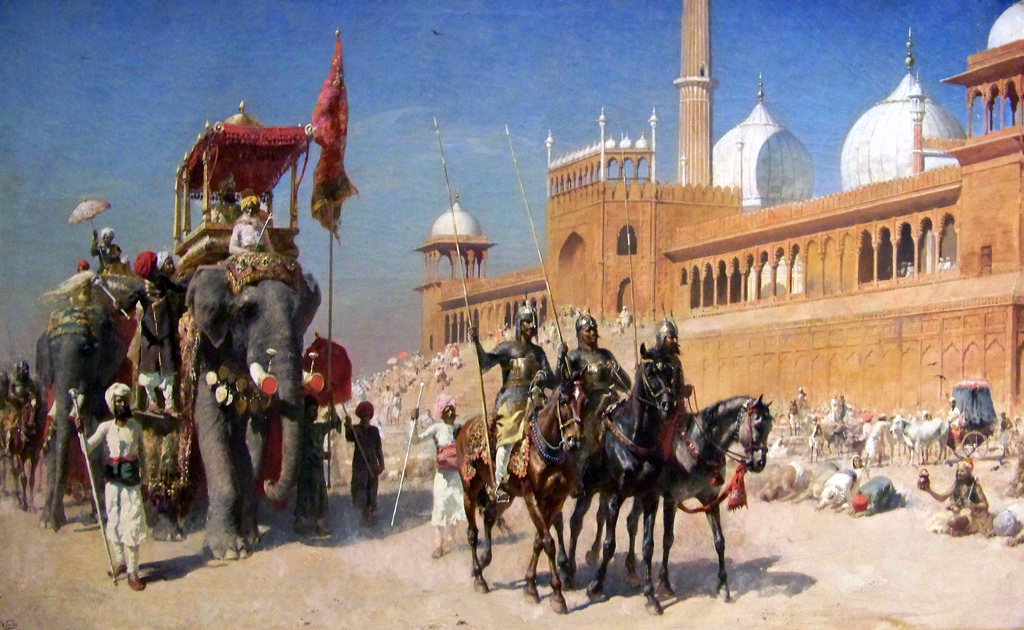
The Great Mughal And His Court Returning From The Great Mosque At Delhi India

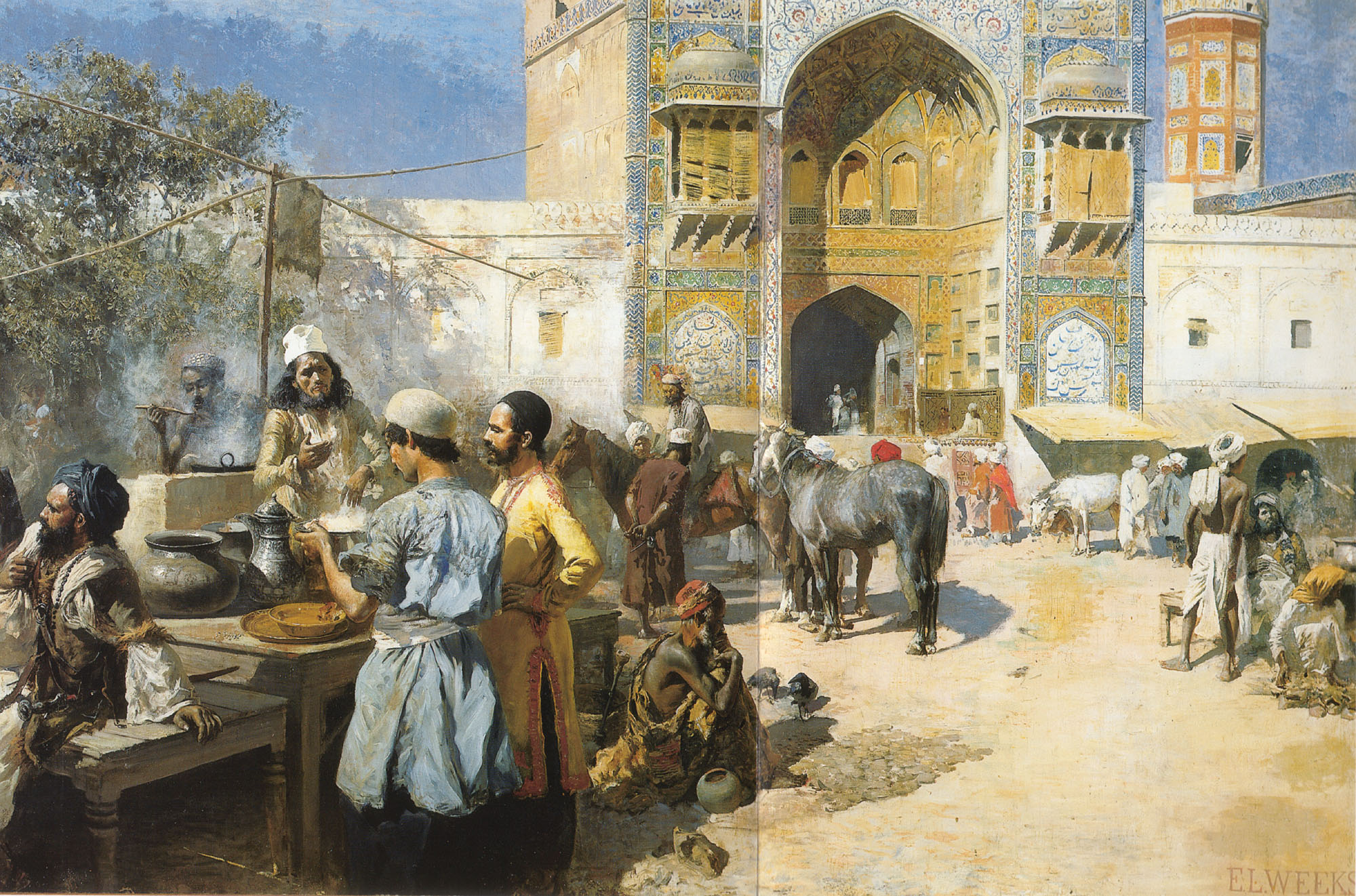
An Open-Air Restaurant near Wazir Khan Mosque, Lahore

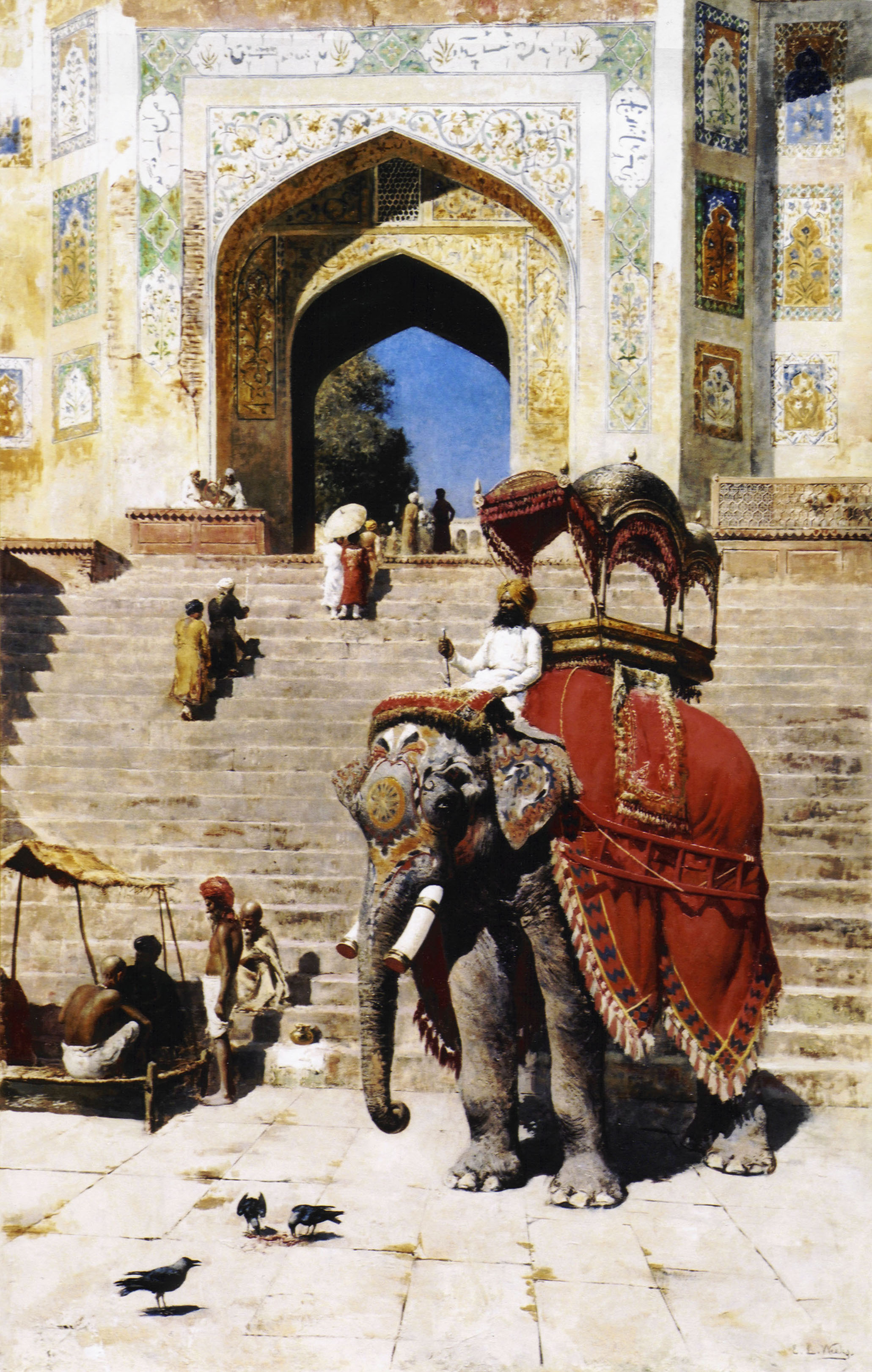
Royal Elephant at the Gateway to the Jama Masjid, Mathura

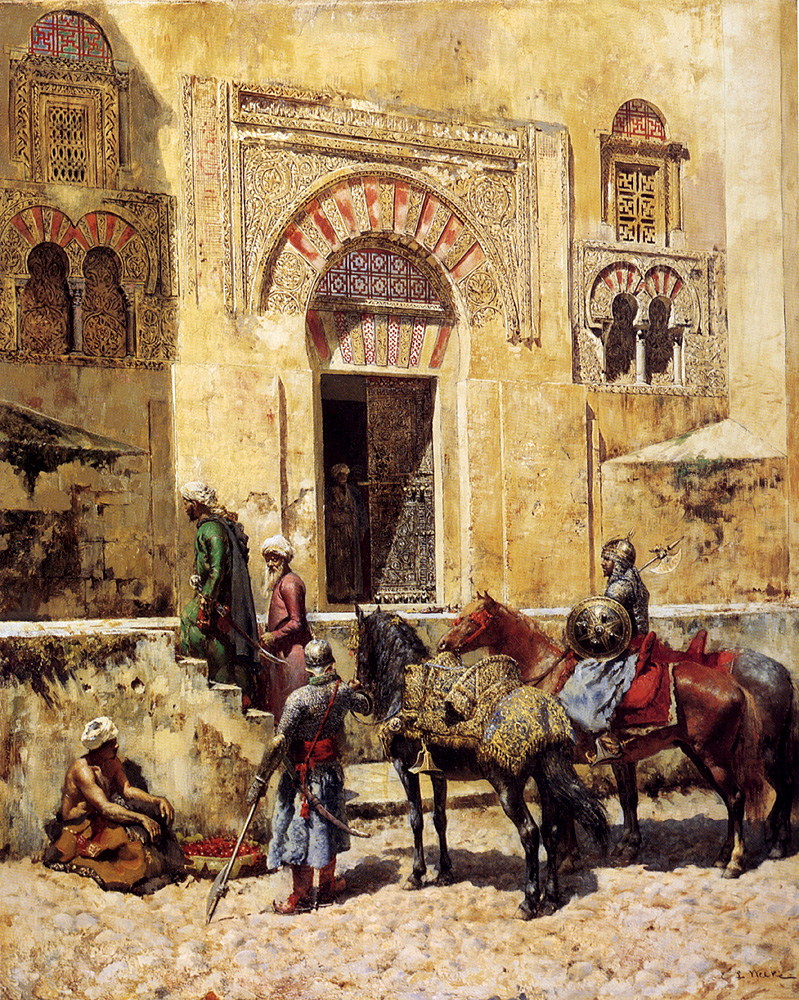
Entering the Mosque, 1885

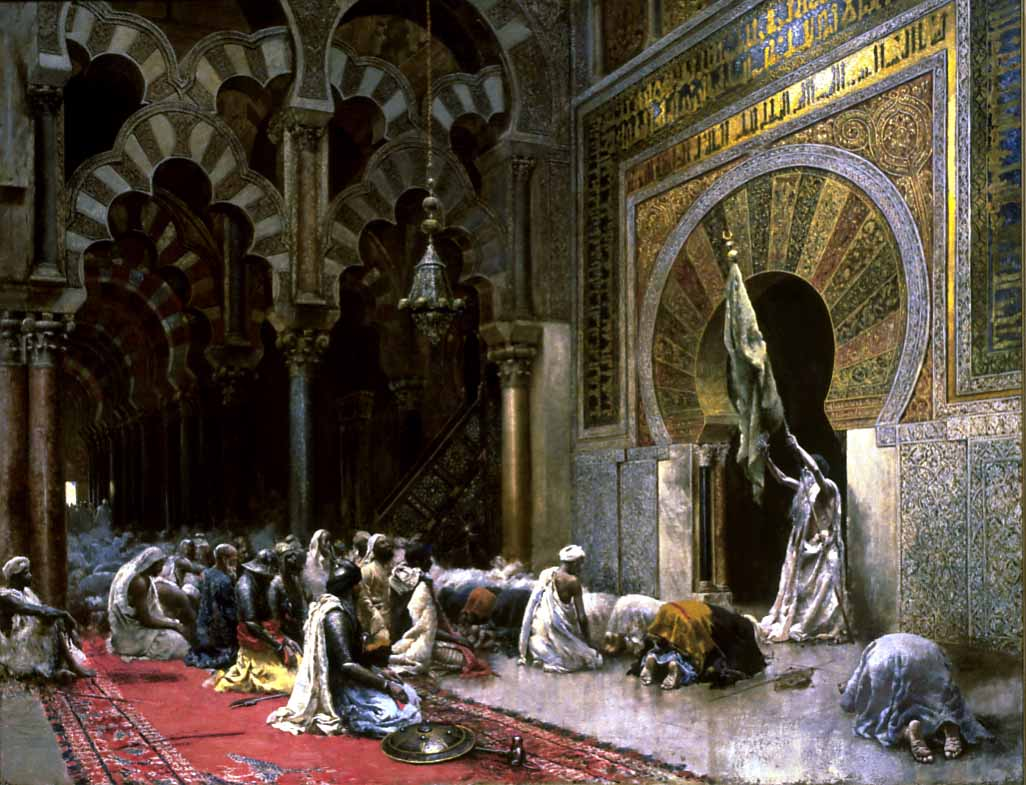
Interior of a Mosque at Cordova (circa 1880), The Walters Art Museum

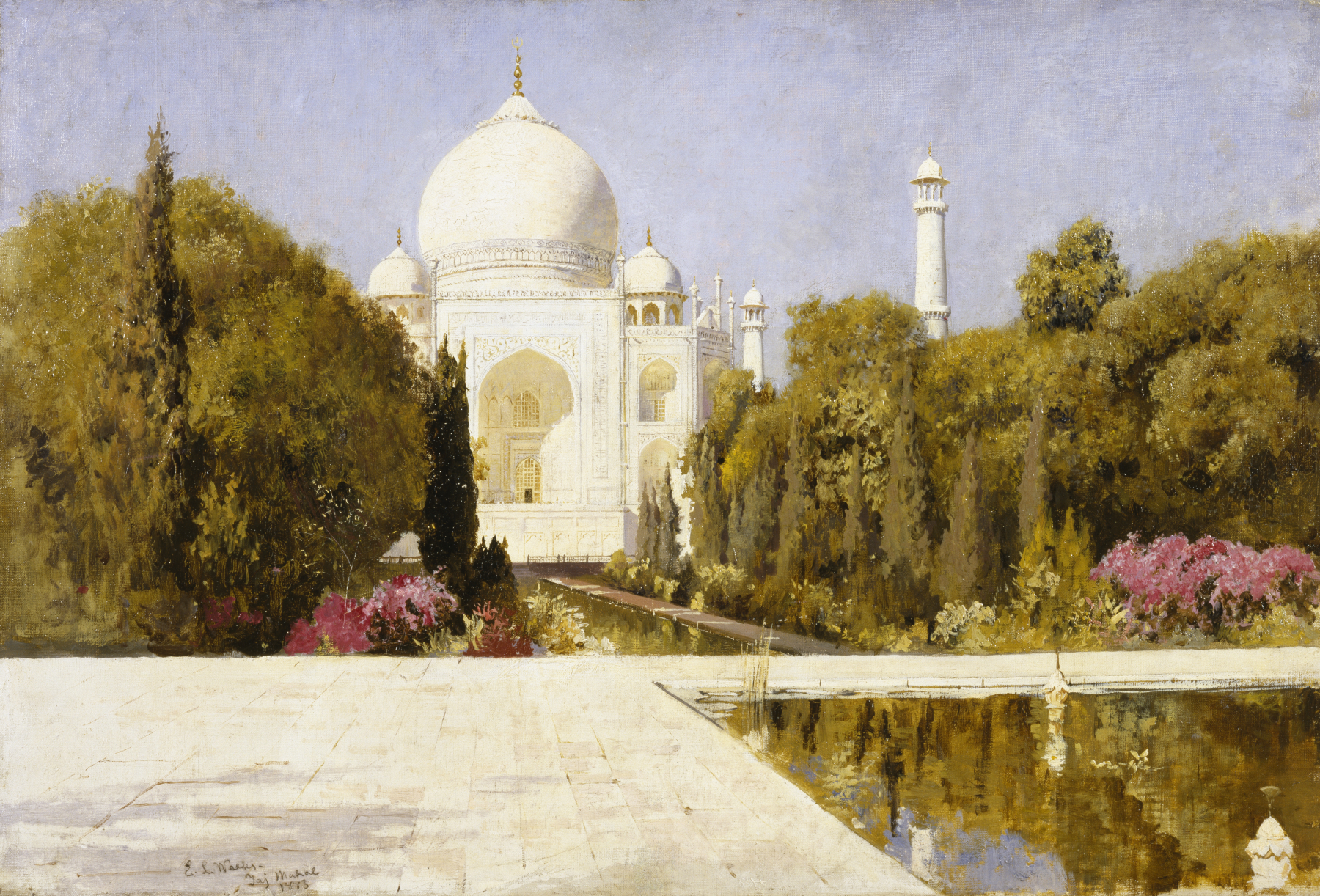
The Taj Mahal, 1883, The Walters Art Museum

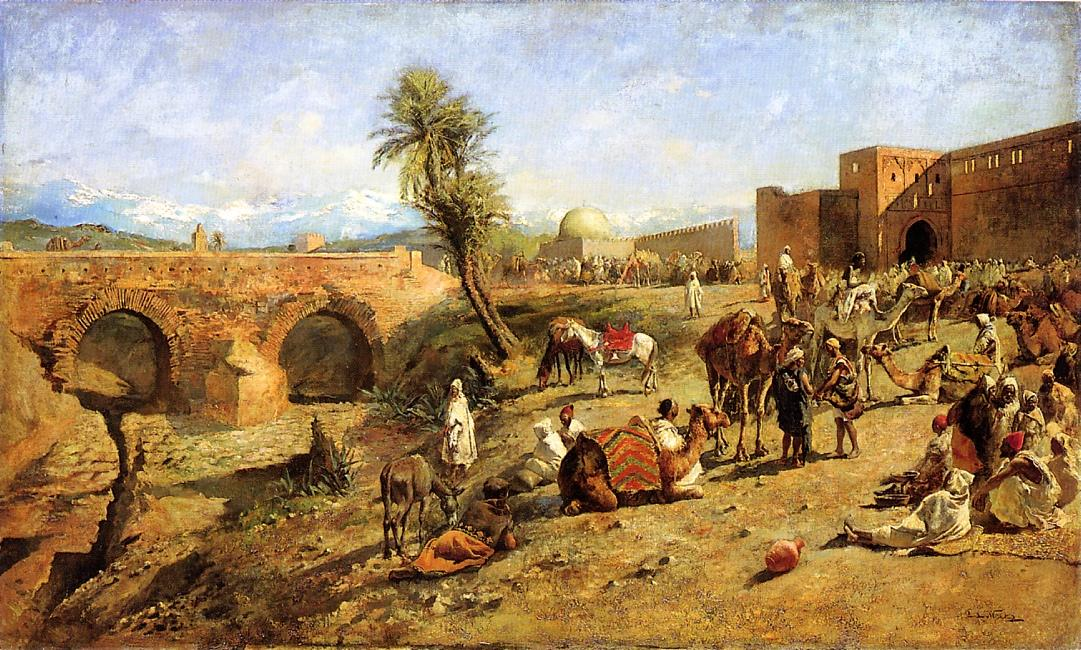
Arrival of a Caravan Outside the City of Morocco

== See also ==
- List of Orientalist artists
- Orientalism
