= Charles Francis Adams Jr. =

American author and historian (1835–1915)

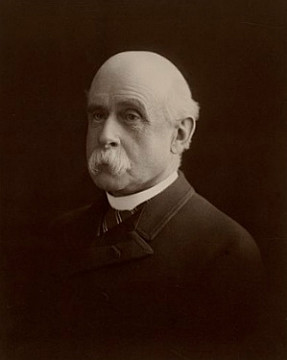

President of Union Pacific Railroad
- In office 1884–1890
- Preceded by: Sidney Dillon
- Succeeded by: Sidney Dillon

Personal details
- Born: Charles Francis Adams Jr. May 27, 1835 Boston, Massachusetts, U.S.
- Died: March 20, 1915 (aged 79) Washington, D.C., U.S.
- Resting place: Mount Wollaston Cemetery, Quincy, Massachusetts
- Spouse: Mary Hone Ogden (m. 1865)
- Relations: Adams political family
- Children: 5
- Parents: Abigail Brown Brooks; Charles Francis Adams Sr.
- Occupation: Soldier, railroad commissioner, park commissioner, author, historian
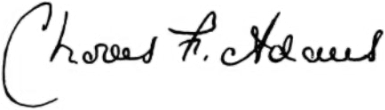
- Signature

Military service
- Allegiance: United States of America; Union
- Branch/service: United States Army; Union Army
- Years of service: 1861–1865
- Rank: Brevet Brigadier General
- Unit: 1st Massachusetts Volunteer Cavalry
- Commands: 5th Regiment Massachusetts Colored Volunteer Cavalry
- Battles/wars: American Civil War; Battle of Secessionville; Maryland campaign; Battle of South Mountain; Battle of Antietam; Gettysburg campaign; Battle of Aldie

Charles Francis Adams Jr. (May 27, 1835 – March 20, 1915) was an American author, historian, and railroad and park commissioner who served as the president of the Union Pacific Railroad from 1884 to 1890. He served as a colonel in the Union Army during the American Civil War. After the war, he was a railroad regulator and executive, an author of historical works, and a member of the Massachusetts Park Commission.

== Early life ==
Adams was born in Boston, May 27, 1835, into a family with a long legacy in American public life. He was a great-grandson of United States President John Adams and a grandson of President John Quincy Adams. His father Charles Francis Adams Sr. was a lawyer, politician, diplomat, and writer. His siblings were older sister Louisa Catherine Adams, wife of Charles Kuhn, of Philadelphia; older brother John Quincy Adams II, father of Charles Francis Adams III; historian Henry Brooks Adams; Arthur Adams, who died in childhood; Mary Adams, who married Henry Parker Quincy, of Dedham, Massachusetts; and historian Peter Chardon Brooks Adams, of Beverly Farms, Massachusetts, who married Evelyn Davis.

Adams graduated from Harvard University in 1856 and then studied law in the office of Richard Henry Dana Jr. and was admitted to the bar in 1858. In 1895, he received an LL.D. degree from Harvard University.

== Civil War ==
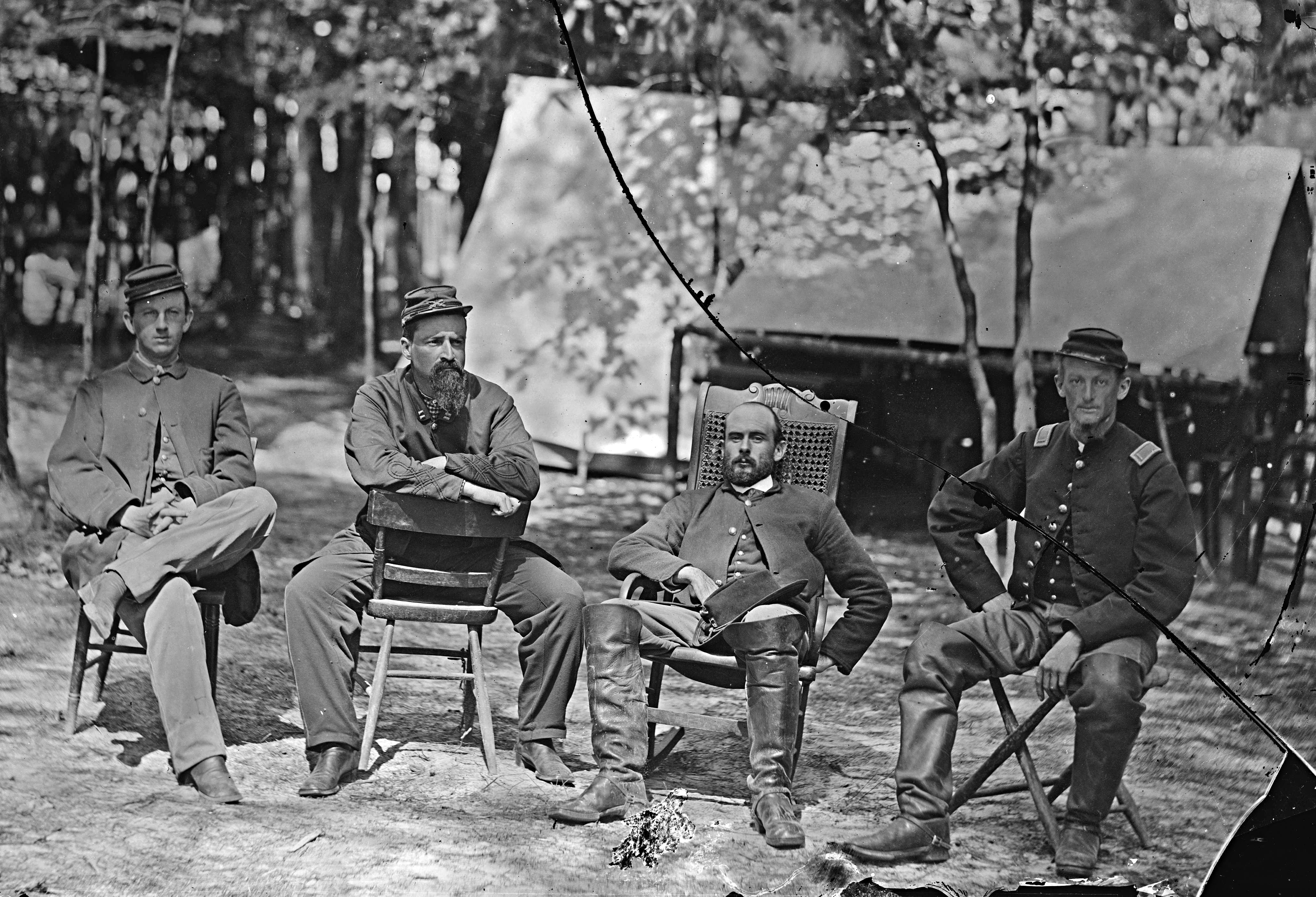
Captain Adams (second from right) with officers of the 1st Massachusetts Cavalry, August 1864

Adams served in the Union Army during the American Civil War. He was commissioned as a first lieutenant in the 1st Massachusetts Volunteer Cavalry on December 28, 1861. He was promoted to captain on December 1, 1862. He fought with distinction during the Gettysburg campaign, where his company was heavily engaged at the Battle of Aldie. When the regiment's 3-year enlistment ended it was reduced to a battalion, and Adams was mustered out of service on September 1, 1864.

On September 8, 1864, he was commissioned as the lieutenant colonel of the 5th Massachusetts Cavalry (officially designated "5th Massachusetts Colored Volunteer Cavalry"). He was promoted to colonel and assumed command of the regiment on March 14, 1865, shortly before the end of the war. When he assumed command, the regiment was assigned guarding Confederate prisoners of war at Point Lookout, Maryland.

Adams, who wished to lead his regiment in combat, was able to get horses for his regiment and had it reassigned to front-line duty during the closing days of the campaign against Richmond. Adams wrote in his autobiography that he regretted having his unit reassigned since he came to the conclusion that the regiment's black soldiers were ill-suited for combat duty. He led his regiment into Richmond shortly after it was captured in April 1865. Not long after on April 16, 1865, Adams received a letter from General Ord relieving him of his command for allowing his troops to "straggle and maraud." Adams returned to Massachusetts in May due to illness (probably dysentery) and resigned from the Army on August 1, 1865.

On July 9, 1866, President Andrew Johnson nominated Colonel Adams for the award of the rank of brevet (honorary) brigadier general, United States Volunteers, "for distinguished gallantry and efficiency at the battles of Secessionville, South Carolina and South Mountain and Antietam, Maryland, and for meritorious services during the war" to rank from March 13, 1865, and the U. S. Senate confirmed the award on July 23, 1866.

Adams was a Veteran Companion of the Massachusetts Commandery of the Military Order of the Loyal Legion of the United States (MOLLUS).

== Railroad reformer ==
=== Massachusetts Railroad Commission ===
Following the Civil War, he was appointed to the Massachusetts Railroad Commission. There he attempted to persuade (rather than coerce) railroads into compliance with accepted business norms. Thomas McCraw called Adams's approach to regulation "the Sunshine Commission," because the purpose of the commission was to expose the corrupt business practices in the hope that, once out in the open, the businessmen would be shamed into mending their ways. It was in this vein that he wrote Chapters of Erie. However, true to his regulatory philosophy, he favored the protection of businessmen over that of the consumers. He saw regulation as necessary to protect investors and other businessmen from the capriciousness of a hostile public or the machinations of other unscrupulous stock jobbers.

=== Union Pacific Railroad ===
Congress distrusted the Union Pacific Railroad (UP) and in 1884 forced it to hire Adams as the new president. Adams had long promoted various reform ideas, as in his book Railroads, Their Origin and Problems (1878), but he had little practical experience in management. As railroad president, he was successful in getting a good press for the UP, and he set up libraries along the route to allow his employees to better themselves. He had poor results dealing with the Knights of Labor. When the union refused extra work in Wyoming in 1885, Adams hired Chinese workers. The result was the Rock Springs massacre, which killed scores of Chinese and drove all the rest out of Wyoming. He tried to build a complex network of alliances with other businesses, but they provided little help to the UP. He had great difficulty in making decisions and in coordinating his subordinates. Adams was unable to stanch the worsening financial condition of the UP, and in 1890 the railroad's owner Jay Gould forced him to resign.

== Historian ==
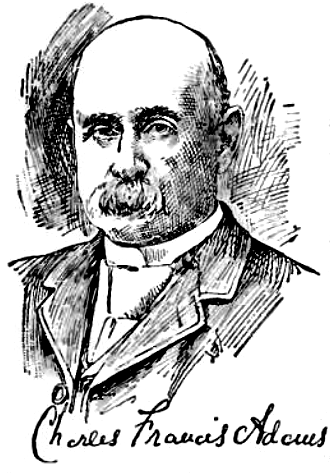
The signature of Charles Francis Adams II

Adams was elected a Fellow of the American Academy of Arts and Sciences in 1871 and a member of the American Antiquarian Society in 1891.

After 1874, he devoted much of his time to the study of American history. In recognition of his work, Adams became vice-president of the Massachusetts Historical Society in 1890, he was chosen president of this society in 1895 and the American Historical Association in 1901. His writings and addresses on problems of railway management and other historical subjects frequently gave rise to widespread controversy.

In 1875, he published an essay on "The Granger Movement" in the North American Review. It exposed the railroad rate rigging and monopoly practices that prompted the movement.

Adams also wrote an autobiography, completed in 1912 and published posthumously in 1916. At the beginning of the autobiography is a memorial address about Adams written by Henry Cabot Lodge.

== Philanthropic activity ==
=== Massachusetts Park Commission ===
From 1893 to 1895, he was chairman of the Massachusetts Park Commission, and as such took a prominent part in planning the present park system of the state. He was influential in establishing the Blue Hills Reservation and the Middlesex Fells Reservation.

=== Single-tax supporter ===
In 1900, he wrote an open letter to the President of the Massachusetts Single Tax League, declaring himself a supporter of the reform Henry George had proposed, which would later be known as Georgism. An excerpt of that letter appeared in The Outlook, December 15, 1900.

=== National Civic Confederation ===
Adams represented the public on the board of arbitration in the industrial department of the National Civic Confederation in New York city, December 17, 1901.

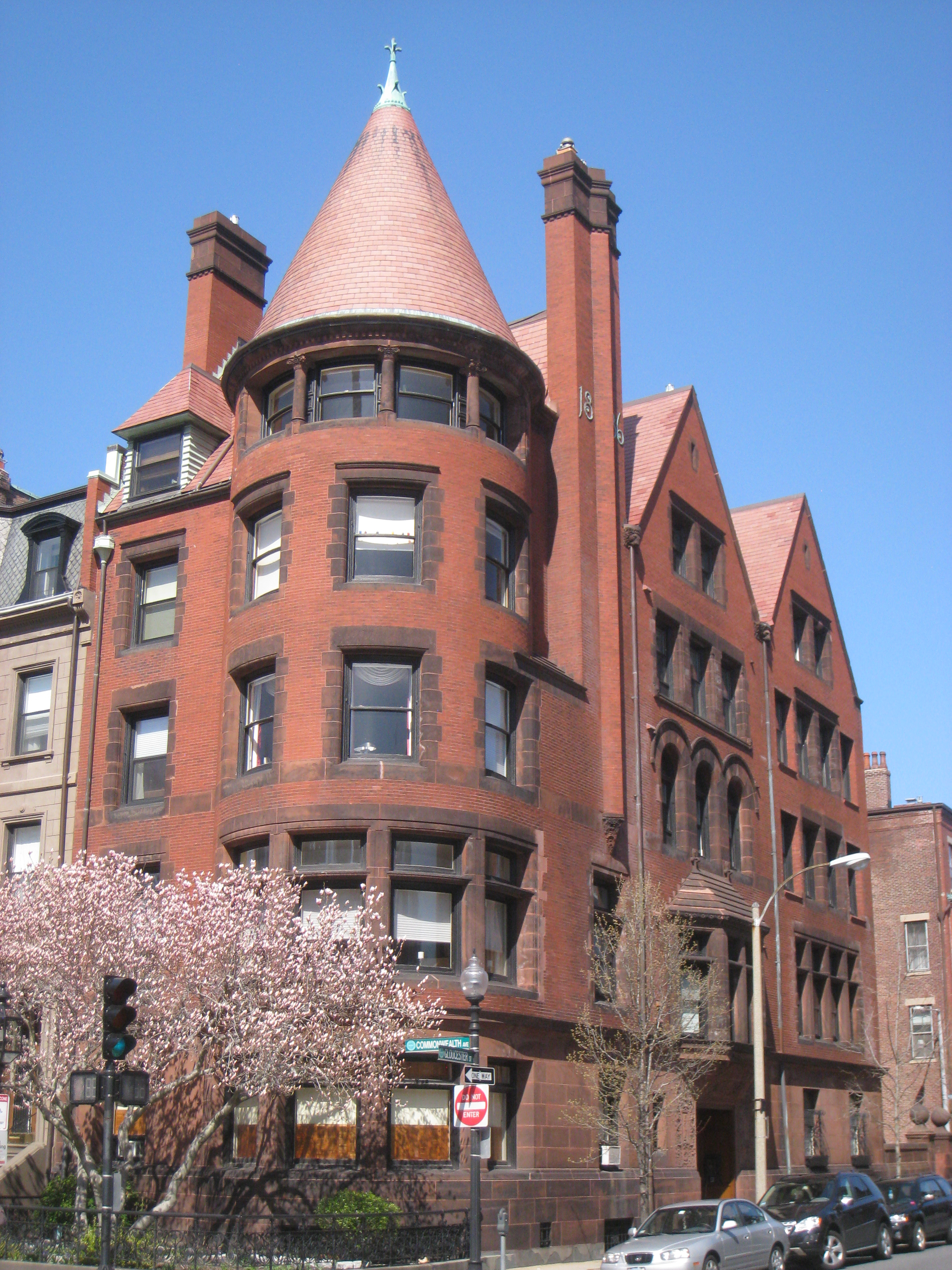
Adams' Back Bay residence, designed by Peabody & Stearns

== Personal life ==
On November 8, 1865, he married Mary Hone Ogden (1843–1934), daughter of Edward and Caroline Callender Ogden. The couple had three daughters and twin sons, both of whom graduated from Harvard in 1898. The five children were:

- Mary Ogden ("Molly") Adams (b. 1867), who married Grafton St. Loe Abbott (1856–1915), a son of U.S. Representative Josiah Gardner Abbott. They were the parents of Mary Ogden Abbott.
- Louisa Catherine Adams (1872–1958), who married Thomas Nelson Perkins (1870–1937).
- Elizabeth Ogden ("Elise") Adams (1873–1945).
- John Francis Adams (1875–1964), who married Marian Morse Adams (1878–1959). They were the parents of Thomas Boylston Adams.
- Henry Quincy Adams (1875–1951).

== Death and burial ==
Adams died May 20, 1915. He is buried in Mount Wollaston Cemetery in Quincy, Massachusetts.

== Works ==
- Chapters of Erie, and Other Essays (New York, 1871), with brother Henry Adams
- Railroads, Their Origin and Problems (New York, 1878)
- Notes on Railroad Accidents (New York, 1879)
- Richard Henry Dana: A Biography (Boston, 1890)
- Three Episodes of Massachusetts History (Boston, 1892), a work that gives an account of the settlement of Boston Bay, of the Antinomian controversy, and of church and town government in early Massachusetts
- Massachusetts: Its Historians and Its History (Boston, 1893)
- Antinomianism in the Colony of Massachusetts Bay, 1636–1638 (1894)
- "Imperialism" and "The Tracks of Our Forefathers" at Project Gutenberg (1898).
- Charles Francis Adams (Boston and New York, 1900), in the American Statesmen series (biography of Charles Francis Adams Sr.)
- Lee at Appomattox, and Other Papers (1902)
- "Reflex Light From Africa," The Century Magazine, vol. 72, pp. 101–111 (1906)
- "Lee's Centennial: An Address by Charles Francis Adams Delivered at Lexington Virginia Saturday January 19 1907"
- Whence the Founders Travel (1907)
- "'The Solid South' and the Afro-American Race Problem," "Speech of Charles Francis Adams at the Academy of Music, Richmond, Va., Saturday Evening, 24 October, 1908"
- "The Trent Affair: An Historical Retrospect". The American Historical Review. 17 (3): 540–562. April 1912. doi:10.2307/1834388. JSTOR 1834388.Published as a book, with "A few changes in language ... and a paragraph added." Boston, 1912
- Tis Sixty Years Since. Address of Charles Francis Adams, Founders' Day, January 16, 1913, University of South Carolina (New York, 1913)
- Charles Francis Adams, 1835–1915: An Autobiography (1916)
- Before and After the Treaty of Washington: The American Civil War and the War in the Transvaal. An address delivered before the New York Historical Society on its ninety-seventh anniversary, Tuesday, November 19, 1901 (New York, 1902)

== Family tree ==
Adams family tree

John Adams (1735–1826)	Abigail Adams (née Smith) (1744–1818)
William Stephens Smith (1755–1816)	Abigail Amelia Adams Smith (1765–1813)	John Quincy Adams (1767–1848)	Louisa Catherine Adams (née Johnson) (1775–1852)	Charles Adams (1770–1800)	Thomas Boylston Adams (1772–1832)
George Washington Adams (1801–1829)	John Adams II (1803–1834)	Charles Francis Adams Sr. (1807–1886)	Abigail Brown Brooks (1808–1889)
Frances Cadwalader Crowninshield (1839–1911)	John Quincy Adams II (1833–1894)	Charles Francis Adams Jr. (1835–1915)	Henry Brooks Adams (1838–1918)	Marian Hooper Adams (1843–1885)	Peter Chardon Brooks Adams (1848–1927)
George Casper Adams (1863–1900)	Charles Francis Adams III (1866–1954)	Frances Adams (née Lovering) (1869–1956)	John Adams (1875–1964)
Henry Sturgis Morgan (1900–1982)	Catherine Lovering Adams Morgan (1902–1988)	Charles Francis Adams IV (1910–1999)	Thomas Boylston Adams (1910–1997)

== See also ==
- List of Massachusetts generals in the American Civil War
- List of railroad executives
- Massachusetts in the American Civil War

Business positions
Preceded by Sidney Dillon	President of Union Pacific Railroad; 1884–1890	Succeeded by Sidney Dillon
