= Cox College (Georgia) =

Private women's college in Georgia from 1842 to 1934

Coordinates: 33°39′19″N 84°26′59″W

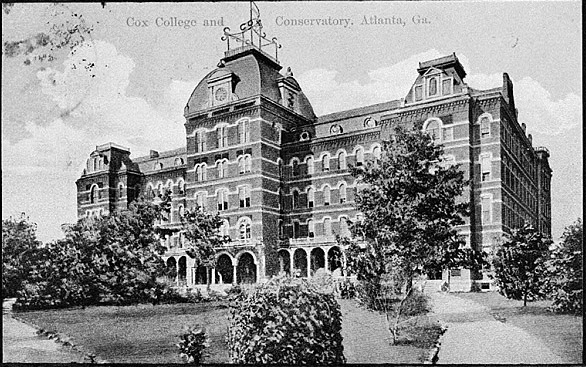
Cox College and Conservatory, 1900

Cox College was a private women's college located in College Park, Georgia that operated from 1842 to 1934.

Cox College was originally called LaGrange Female Seminary in 1842 when it opened in LaGrange, Georgia. It changed names several times: to LaGrange Collegiate Seminary for Young Ladies in 1850, Southern and Western Female College in 1852, Southern Female College in 1854; and finally to Cox College by the 1890s. Part of the school moved to East Point, Georgia in the 1890s, however the main institution moved to Manchester, Georgia in 1895, which renamed itself College Park in 1896. By 1913 it was sometimes referred to as Cox College and Conservatory. It closed several times, including ten years between 1923 and 1933. It reopened one more time in 1933, but closed for a final time in 1934. Cox College’s closure effectively rendered the name of College Park a misnomer.

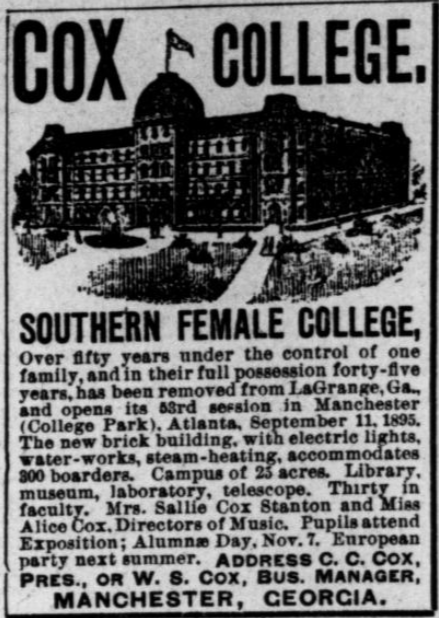
1895 advertisement for the college in The Atlanta Constitution

== Notable alumni ==
- Ruth Blair, first woman state historian of Georgia
- Lella A. Dillard (A. B. 1881), president of the Georgia Woman's Christian Temperance Union
- Ida Pruitt, social worker and writer on Sino-American relations
- Lucy May Stanton, artist known for her portrait miniatures, graduated in 1893

== See also ==
- List of women's colleges

== Sources ==
- Early 1900s College Viewbook for Cox College, Westminster College
- Cox College and Conservatory, The Digital Library of Georgia
