= Emily James Smith Putnam =

American author and educator

Emily James Putnam
- Born: Emily James Smith; April 15, 1865; Canandaigua, New York, U.S.
- Died: September 7, 1944 (aged 79); Kingston, Jamaica
- Education: Girton College, Cambridge University, 1889–1890
- Alma mater: Bryn Mawr College, 1889
- Known for: Author, educator
- Spouse: George Haven Putnam (m. 1899)
- Parent(s): James Cosslett Smith (1817–1900); Emily Ward Adams (1822–1896)

Emily James Putnam (née Emily James Smith; April 15, 1865 – September 7, 1944) was an American classical scholar, author and educator. She was the first dean of Barnard College.

== Biography ==
She was the daughter of Justice James Cosslett Smith (1817–1900). She graduated from Bryn Mawr College in 1889 and studied at Girton College, Cambridge University, from 1889 to 1890.

She was teacher of Greek at the Packer Collegiate Institute, Brooklyn, in 1891–1893. She was a fellow in Greek at the University of Chicago in 1893–1894, and dean of Barnard College in 1894–1900. She was a trustee of Barnard College in 1900–1905, and president of the League for Political Education (co-founded by her sister-in-law Mary Putnam Jacobi) in 1901–1904. She was vice-president and manager of the Women's University Club, New York City, in 1907–1911.

Emily James Smith – on April 27, 1899, in Canandaigua, New York – married American writer and publisher George Haven Putnam (1844–1930). Following the death of her husband, she retired from Barnard in 1930 and lived in Spain. She moved to Jamaica after the Spanish Civil War broke out. She died on September 7, 1944, in Kingston.

== Works ==
- Adams, Herbert B[axter] (1850–1901) (ed.). Circular of Information No. 3, 1900. Series: Contributions to American Educational History. Vol. 28. Washington: U.S. Bureau of Education, Government Printing Office. LCCN 01-21013; OCLC 3123002 (all editions).
1. Sherwood, Sidney (1860–1901), ed. (1900). The University of the State of New York: History of Higher Education in the State of New York.
  1. Part II: "The Institutions Comprised in the University [of the State of New York]." Chapter 6: "Universities and Colleges for Women – First Efforts Toward the Higher Education of Women in New York State". Bureau of Education. Circular of Information. pp. 437–476 – via HathiTrust (University of Illinois Urbana-Champaign).
    1. Smith, E[mily] J[ames] (1900). "Barnard College". pp. 471–475.
      1. "History". pp. 471–472.
      2. "Academic Statement". pp. 473–475.
- Publications of The Association of Collegiate Alumnæ. Richmond Hill, New York. LCCN sf85-3014; ISSN 2641-8010; OCLC 1514601 (all editions).
1. Smith, Emily James (December 1898). "Some Further Considerations on College Curricula [for Women]". Series 3, no. 1. pp. 29–31 (part III) – via Internet Archive.
- Putnam, Emily James (1910). The Lady – Studies of Certain Significant Phases of Her History. New York: Sturgis & Walton Company; also New York & London: G.P. Putnam's Sons. LCCN 10-26824; OCLC 835437981 (all editions); 538053824, 1157182783, 1364359257, and 504072750.
1. Via HathiTrust (UC San Diego).
2. Via Internet Archive (Robarts Library, University of Toronto).
3. Via Google Books (Stanford Library).
A collection of eight essays examining successive historical forms of the cultural figure of the “lady”—the woman of the "favored social class"—from classical antiquity to the early 20th century, first published in magazines such as The Contemporary Review and The Atlantic Monthly. Trade publications reviewers described The Lady as a series of studies of women in different periods and societies, beginning with the Greek lady and tracing changing ideals of education and culture.
The Lady in other languages:
1. Dutch: De dames onder het ancien régime : ontleend aan Emily James Putnam : The Lady (in Dutch). OCLC 320837527 (all editions).
2. Swedish: Societetsdamen Från Hellas Tid Till Våra Dagar (in Swedish). Translated from English to Swedish by Ingrid Kleen. Stockholm: Norstedt. 1912. OCLC 479943656 (all editions).
- Putnam, Emily James (1926). Candaules' Wife and Other Old Stories. New York & London: G.P. Putnam's Sons. LCCN 26-14725; OCLC 1981408 (all editions).
1. Via HathiTrust (University of Michigan).
A collection of stories retold by the author drawn largely from classical antiquity and historical literature.
- Faguet, [Auguste] Émile (1847–1916) (1914). The Dread of Responsibility. Translated, with introduction, by Emily James Putnam. New York & London: G.P. Putnam's Sons. LCCN 14-18382; OCLC 2396584 (all editions), 559314373.
1. Via HathiTrust (Cal Berkeley).
- Whitney, Henry M[elville] (1839–1923) (October 1910). "Reciprocity with Canada". The Atlantic Monthly. Vol. 106, no. 4. pp. 461–468 – via Internet Archive (University of Toronto).
1. "Letter from Henry Melville Whitney to Theodore Roosevelt". Library of Congress Manuscript Division (archivist). November 17, 1905 – via Theodore Roosevelt Center. OCLC 1577411847.
Henry Melville Whitney disputes President Roosevelt’s claim that Whitney had misrepresented his views on Canadian reciprocity.
- The Atlantic Monthly. Boston and New York: Atlantic Monthly Company. LCCN sn94-95575, LCCN sf98-94157; ISSN 0160-6514; OCLC 33199310 (all editions), (redundant → OCLC 3880400 (all editions)).
1. Putnam, Emily James (November 1893). "Hungry Greeklings". Vol. 72, no. 5 (whole no. 333). pp. 685–693 – via HathiTrust (Cal Berkeley).
2. Putnam, Emily James (June 1910). "The Roman Lady" (PDF). Vol. 105, no. 6. pp. 785–794 – via The Atlantic Monthly Group. OCLC 826403504.
3. Putnam, Emily James (September 1910). "The Lady of the Castle" (9 gatherings of 16 pages; 144 pp. total; unsigned → collation: [A–I]⁸). Vol. 106, no. 3 (within gathering D–E¹⁶, unsigned) (half-year bound ed.). pp. 347–358 – via Internet Archive (University of Toronto).
4. Putnam, Emily James (October 1910). "Lady of the Slave States". Vol. 106, no. 4 (half-year bound ed.). pp. 491–502 – via Internet Archive (University of Toronto). OCLC 933731891.
5. Putnam, Emily James (September 1914). "Pagan Morals". Vol. 114, no. 3. pp. 355–362 – via Google Books (Harvard).
6. Putnam, Emily James (April 1926). "Helen in Egypt". [a story based on Herodotus]. Vol. 137, no. 4 (within signature B¹⁶). pp. 481–491 – via Internet Archive (Boston Public Library).
7. Putnam, Emily James (May 1926). "Hippoclides Doesn't Care". [a story based on Herodotus]. Vol. 137, no. 5 (within signature B¹⁶). pp. 610–622 – via Internet Archive (Boston Public Library).
8. Putnam, Emily James (August 1926). "Candaules' Wife". Vol. 138, no. 2 (within signature B¹⁶). pp. 183–192 – via Internet Archive (Plainfield, New Jersey, Public Library).
9. Putnam, Mrs. George Haven (November 1936). "Street Scene" (PDF). The Contributor's Club. Vol. 125, no. 5. pp. 636–639 – via The Atlantic Monthly Group.
10. Putnam, Emily James (June 1938). "An Atlantic Portrait: Paul Shorey" (PDF). pp. 795–804 – via The Atlantic Monthly Group.
- Barnard College Alumnae (monthly). ISSN 0749-1263; OCLC 54482507 (all editions) & 11050697.
1. "Spanish Adventure – An Eye-Witness Account by Emily James Putnam". Vol. 26, no. 1. October 1936. p. 9 – via Internet Archive.
- Life. New York. LCCN sf88-90971; ISSN 0024-3019; OCLC 4923265 (all editions).
1. Smith, Emily James (November 11, 1915). Quotes (SIM Box ID & Canister no.: IA1529716–03). Internet Archive Collection: SIM Microfilm; Periodicals; Pub Life. (Cal Berkeley). Vol. 66, whole no. 1724. Retrieved March 9, 2026.
  1. "I never saw a man who wanted to trade places with his wife, but I've heard hundreds of girls wish out loud that they were me.". p. 898.
  2. "A Matter of Costume" – "Girls have been taught for generations that it is feminine to shriek at a mouse! Instead of that it's the height of the ridiculous.". p. 904.
- The Outlook. New York. LCCN sf85-1149, LCCN sf89-99145; ISSN 2690-1811; OCLC 5361126 (all editions).
1. Smith, Emily James (June 22, 1895). "Preparation for College". Vol. 51, no. 25. p. 1095 – via HathiTrust (Cal Berkeley).
- The Nation.
1. Smith, Emily James (March 22, 1894). Americans at the English Universities. Vol. 58, no. 1499. pp. 208–209 – via Internet Archive.
- Classical Philology. University of Chicago Press. LCCN 07-22643; ISSN 0009-837X; OCLC 1166972 (all editions).
1. Putnam, Emily James (April 1909). "Lucian the Sophist". Vol. 4, no. 2. pp. 162–177. doi:10.1086/359268; JSTOR 261824.
2. Putnam, Emily James (April 1911). "Book Reviews". Vol. 6, no. 2. pp. 222–223. doi:10.1086/359523; JSTOR 261925; OCLC 4636524498 (article).
Book Review: The Iphigenia in Tauris of Euripides. Translated into English Rhyming Verse with Explanatory Notes by Gilbert Murray, LLD, D.Litt, Religious Professor of Greek in the University of Oxford. New York: Oxford University Press (American Branch). 1910 – via Google Books (Harvard). OCLC 551517699 (all editions), 2558508.
- The Fiftieth Anniversary of The Opening of Vassar College (October 10–13, 1915). A Record. Poughkeepsie: Vassar College. Boston: D[aniel] B[erkeley] Updike (1860–1941) – Merrymount Press. 1916. Retrieved March 9, 2025. LCCN 16-13061; OCLC 1880537 (all editions).
1. Putnam, Emily James. Chapter: "Women and Democracy". pp. 109–125 – via Internet Archive (Cal Berkeley)..
- Putnam's Magazine.
1. Putnam, Emily James (January 1908). "A Classical Education". Vol. 3, no. 4. pp. 418–424 – via Internet Archive.
2. Putnam, Emily James (December 1908). "As Europe Sees Us". Vol. 5, no. 3. pp. 360–365 – via Internet Archive.
3. Putnam, Emily James (April 1909). "Sicily: Land of Unrest". Vol. 6, no. 1. pp. 31–40 – via Internet Archive.
4. Putnam, Emily James (July 1909). "George Meredith". Vol. 6, no. 4. pp. 446–455 – via Internet Archive.
  1. See: George Meredith (1828–1909).
5. Putnam, Emily James (March 1910). "The Greek Lady". Vol. 7, no. 6. pp. 681–689 – via Internet Archive.
- The Contemporary Review.
1. Putnam, Emily James (April 1910). "The Greek Lady". Vol. 97. pp. 413–428 – via Google Books (UCLA).
2. Putnam, Emily James (May 1910). "The Roman Lady". Vol. 97. pp. 555–567 – via Google Books (UCLA).
3. Putnam, Emily James (June 1910). "Lady Abess". Vol. 98. pp. 676–691 – via Google Books (UCLA).
4. Putnam, Emily James (July 1910). "The Lady of the Castle". Vol. 98. pp. 25–47 – via Google Books (Michigan).
5. Putnam, Emily James (August 1910). "The Lady of the Renaissance". Vol. 98. pp. 157–173 – via Google Books (Michigan).
6. Putnam, Emily James (September 1910). "The Lady of the Salon". Vol. 98. pp. 284–299 – via Google Books (Michigan).
7. Putnam, Emily James (October 1910). "The Lady of the Blue Stockings". Vol. 98. pp. 425–440 – via Google Books (Michigan).
8. Putnam, Emily James (November 1910). "The Lady of the Slave States". Vol. 98. pp. 566–884 – via Google Books (Michigan).
9. Putnam, Emily James (December 1910). "The Lady Summarised". Vol. 98. pp. 653–660 – via Google Books (Michigan).
- The New Republic.
1. Putnam, Emily James (December 15, 1917). "Prudence and the Classics". Vol. 13, no. 163. pp. 177–178.
2. Putnam, Emily James (February 4, 1920). "A Communication: Progress of the New School of Social Research". Vol. 21, no. 270. p. 294.
- The Bookman. An Illustrated Magazine of Literature and Life. New York: Dodd, Mead & Company. LCCN 06-18409; ISSN 2156-9932; OCLC 1536785 (all editions).
1. Putnam, Emily James (January 1911). "Treatment of the Lady". Vol. 7, no. 5. pp. 451–452 – via Internet Archive (Michigan).
- The Unpopular Review (quarterly). New York: Henry Holt and Company. LCCN sf83-1177; OCLC 3175207 (all editions).
1. Putnam, Emily James (April–June 1914). "The Greeks on Religion and Morals". Vol. 1, no. 2. pp. 358–374 – via Google Books (University of Chicago).
2. Putnam, Emily James (October–December 1915). "Wayland the Feminist". Vol. 4, no. 8. pp. 237–254 – via Google Books (Princeton).
- The Classical Weekly. LCCN 2007-212774; ISSN 1940-641X; OCLC 1640122 (all editions).
1. Putnam, Emily J[ames] (October 6, 1924). Review. Vol. 18, no. 1 (whole no. 478). pp. 6–7. doi:10.2307/4388565; JSTOR 4388565; OCLC 7547343684 (article).
Book reviewed: Lucas, (F[rank] L[aurence] (1894–1967) (1923). Euripides and His Influence. (Our Debt to Greece and Rome Series). Boston: Marshall Jones Company – via Internet Archive (Phillips Academy). LCCN 24-3990; OCLC 1886406 (all editions).
- Berger, Marcel (1885–1966); Berger, Maude (1918). The Secret of the Marne – How Sergeant Fritsch Saved Europe (trans.). New York: G.P. Putnam's Sons. OCLC 4525038 (all editions).
1. Via Internet Archive (Cornell).
2. Via Internet Archive (Michigan).
- Escholier, Raymond (1882–1971) (1922). The Illusion. Translation of Dansons la trompeuse. New York: G.P. Putnam. OCLC 1049087700 (all editions).
- American Journal of Philology. ISSN 1086-3168 (online), ISSN 0002-9475 (print).
1. Smith, Emily James (1897). "On Lucian's Nigrinus". Vol. 18, no. 3. pp. 339–341. doi:10.2307/287829; JSTOR 287829; OCLC 179744765, 1550285666.
- Lucian of Samosata (c. 125–after 180) (1892). Selections from Lucian. Translated from Greek to English by Emily James Smith. New York: Harper & Brothers. NCID BA4371645X; OCLC 3674073, 561016511.
1. Via HathiTrust (Harvard).
Lucian himself was a Syrian (historically, Roman Syria of the Kingdom of Commagene) from Samosata, but he wrote in an Atticizing form of Ancient Greek, the intellectual language of the eastern Roman Empire.

== Bibliography ==
=== Secondary references ===
- Commire, Anne (1939–2012), ed. (1999). Women in World History: A Biographical Encyclopedia (14 Vols.). Also Deborah Klezmer, assoc. ed.; Barbara Morgan, asst. ed. Waterford, Connecticut: Yorkin Publications. LCCN 99-24692; ISBN 0-7876-3736-X (14 Vol. set); ISBN 978-0-7876-4071-2, 0-7876-4071-9 (Vol. 12).
1. Vol. 12: "O–Q" – "Putnam, Emily James (1865–1944)". pp. 851–852.
- New York Times (The). LCCN sn78-4456, LCCN sn00-61556; ISSN 0362-4331, ISSN 1553-8095 (online); OCLC 1645522 (all editions).
1. "Mr. Putman's Loving Cup". Mr. Putman's Loving Cup (supplement). Vol. 48, whole no. 15389. May 6, 1899. p. 303 (column 2).
  1. NYTimes Archives → Blog.
  2. TimesMachine → Pdf (PDF); Permalink (digital image 29 (of 30)). ProQuest 106817122 (Historical Newspapers: Global database).
  3. Newspapers.com.
2. "Mrs. G. H. Putnam, Barnard Ex-Dean – Writer, Educator Dies in West Indies—Publisher's Widow, Instructor in Greek" (i) "Lecturer at New School" (ii) "Under Fire in Tarragona". Vol. 93, whole no. 31640. September 9, 1944. p. 15, (column 4, top). Retrieved March 9, 2026.
  1. NYTimes Archives → Blog.
  2. TimesMachine → Pdf (PDF); Permalink. ProQuest 106817122 (Historical Newspapers: Global database).
- Schneir, Miriam, ed. (1996) [1972, 1992]. The Vintage Book of Historical Feminism. Compiled, edited, introduction, and commentaries by Schneir (UK ed.). New York: Vintage Books. ISBN 978-0-0995-9781-0, 0-0995-9781-0; OCLC 537453724 (all editions).
1. Section V: "Twentieth–Century Themes": "Emily James Putnam – The Lady". pp. 247–253.
2. Section V: "Twentieth–Century Themes": "Anna Garland Spencer – Woman's Share in Social Culture". p. 268.
First edition: Schneir, Miriam, ed. (1972). Feminism: The Essential Historical Writings. New York: Random House. LCCN 70-159371 (1972 ed.), LCCN 94-200166 (1994 ed.); ISBN 978-0-3944-7191-4, 0-3944-7191-1, ISBN 978-0-3947-1738-8, 0-3947-1738-4, ISBN 978-0-6797-5381-0, 0-6797-5381-8; OCLC 239916 (all editions).

=== Tertiary references ===
- Hamersly, Lewis Randolph (1847–1910), ed. (1905) [1904]. "Putnam, Mrs. Emily James." & "Putnam, George Haven". Who's Who in New York City and State (Revised ed.). L. R. Hamersly Company. p. 731.
1. Via HathiTrust (Michigan). p. 180.
2. Via Internet Archive (NYPL). p. 180.
- Marriage License (April 27, 1899). Emily J. Smith in the New York State, Marriage Index, 1881–1967 (Certificate No. 6843). Spouse: George H. Putnam. Canandaigua, New York – via Ancestry.com.

=== Primary references and collections ===
- Columbia University Libraries.
1. Annie Nathan Meyer papers, [c. 1890–1950] (Emily James Putnam correspondence). OCLC 298686794, 122622008.
2. Barnard College dean's office received correspondence, 1888–1904 (Contains letters written to the first deans of Barnard College). OCLC 275962379.
3. Dean's Office Records, 1894–1952. This collection consists of records produced by the Dean's Office from 1894 to 1952 – primarily correspondence between the Dean's Office and academic and administrative departments of Barnard; schools, departments and administrative offices of Columbia University; and organizations, associations and institutions with which Barnard was affiliated or in communication. Barnard College. OCLC 298686790.
4. Emily James Putnam Correspondence [c. 1896–1897]. OCLC 81649367.
5. Emily James Smith Putnam's correspondence as Dean of Barnard [c. 1896–1897] (Emily James Putnam correspondence). OCLC 122632633.
6. Barnard College Records, 1889–[c. 1950] (Correspondence from the founding of Barnard College, 1889, through 1950). OCLC 122412032.
- Online books, and library resources in your library and in other libraries by Emily James Smith Putnam

==== Attribution ====
- This article incorporates text from a publication now in the public domain: Rines, George Edwin, ed. (1920). "Putman, Emily James Smith" . Encyclopedia Americana.
