= Raphael Pumpelly =

American geologist (1837–1923)

- Born: September 8, 1837; Owego, New York, US
- Died: August 10, 1923 (aged 85); Newport, Rhode Island, US
- Scientific career
- Fields: Geology, archeology
- Workplaces: Harvard University

Raphael Pumpelly (September 8, 1837 – August 10, 1923) was an American geologist and explorer.

== Biography ==
=== Early life and ancestors ===
He was born on September 8, 1837, in Owego, New York, into a family with deep New England roots that trace back to Thomas Welles (1590–1659), who arrived in Massachusetts in 1635 and was the only man in Connecticut's history to hold all four top offices: governor, deputy governor, treasurer, and secretary; John Deming, (1615–1705) an early Puritan settler and original patentee of the Connecticut Colony; and Honor Treat, the daughter of Richard Treat (1584–1669) an early New England settler, Deputy to the Connecticut Legislature and also a Patentee of the Royal Charter of Connecticut, 1662.

He was also a descendant of William Pynchon, a colonial assistant treasurer and original patentee of the Massachusetts Bay Colony. He led the 1635 settlement of Springfield, Hampden County, Massachusetts, which was named after his home village, now a suburb of Chelmsford in Essex, England; and Captain Elizur Holyoke, the namesake of the mountain, Mount Holyoke, and (indirectly), of the city of Holyoke, Massachusetts.

His father was William Pumpelly, son of John Pumpelly and Hannah Bushnell. His father was a great-grandson of Jean Pompilie, a sea captain who settled at Plymouth, Massachusetts. He was a French Huguenot refugee from Avignon, France, originally from Spoleto, Italy.

His mother, Mary Hollenbeck Welles (born in Athens, Pennsylvania, 6 May 1803; died in Paris, France, 4 December 1879), was a poet. She was the daughter of Prudence Talcott and George Welles (a 1779 graduate of Yale College.) She wrote religious historical poems, including "Belshazar's Feast," "Pilate's Wife's Dream," "Herod's Feast," and "An Ode to Shakespeare." Some of these were collected and published in a volume (New York, 1852).

=== Education ===
Pumpelly attended common schools and graduated from Owego Academy in Owego, Tioga County, New York. Against his parents objections, he decided against attending Yale University and chose to study and travel in Europe. He graduated in 1859 from the "Technische Universität Bergakademie Freiberg" (Translation from the German: Freiberg University of Mining and Technology or Freiberg Mining Academy, University of Technology; TUBAF). He also attended the polytechnic school in Hanover. After graduating, he traveled extensively through the mining districts of Europe for the purpose of studying geology and metallurgy by direct observation.

After graduating, Pumpelly moved to Tioga Point, now Athens, in Bradford County, Pennsylvania, where he was soon appointed a Justice of the Peace, and became land agent for the Hon. Charles Carroll of Carrollton, Maryland. Carroll held a license as innkeeper in Athens from 1798 to 1809. It was said of him that he was a man of ability, and became possessed of large amount of property.

=== Career ===
In 1860, Pumpelly was engaged in mining operations in Arizona. Invited by the respective governments, from 1861 to 1863 he surveyed Yesso Island of Japan. and the coalfields of northern China After this, he made the first extensive survey of the Gobi Desert, and explored Mongolia and Siberia.

From 1866 to 1875, he was Professor of Mining Science at Harvard University. Among his scientific accomplishments was a theory of secular rock disintegration. He was influenced by Louis Agassiz.

In June 1870, he was living in a rooming house in Cambridge, Mass., where former slave and abolitionist author Harriet Jacobs also resided.

From 1870 to 1871, he conducted the geological survey of the copper region of Michigan, for which he prepared "Copper-Bearing Rocks," being part ii of volume i of the Geological Survey of Michigan (New York, 1873). He was called upon in 1871 to conduct the geological survey of Missouri, and for three years devoted his energies to that task, preparing "A Preliminary Report on the Iron Ores and Coal Fields," with an atlas, for the report of the Geological Survey of Missouri (New York, 1873). He was elected as a member to the American Philosophical Society in 1874.

When the U. S. Geological Survey was established in 1879, Pumpelly organized the division of economic geology, and as a special agent of the Tenth Census he planned and directed the investigations on the mining industries, exclusive of the precious metals, and prepared volume xv of the Census Reports on "The Mining Industries of the United States" (Washington, 1886). From 1879 to 1880, he conducted at Newport, Rhode Island, an elaborate investigation for the National Board of Health as to the ability of various soils to filter spores from liquids and from air. He became a resident of Newport in 1879, and lived there for 44 years.

In 1879, Pumpelly introduced the idea that the numerous lakes of the Canadian Shield are the result of the creation of basins due to the stripping of an irregular mantle of weathered rock by glacier erosion. This idea was subsequently adopted by Alfred Gabriel Nathorst used it to explain the great number of lakes existing in southern Sweden.

In 1881, he organized the Northern Transcontinental Survey for the Northern Pacific Railroad and published parts of his report in the Tenth Census. This survey collected information concerning the topographical and economic features of Dakota, Montana, and Washington territories. He had charge of this work until its cessation in 1884, and also edited the reports of the survey. He was appointed the Director of the U.S. Geological Survey, New England branch, in 1884.

Pumpelly spent his summers in Dublin, New Hampshire, near Mount Monadnock, and in 1884 he blazed a trail from his summer house to the summit along a ridge that carries his name. The Pumpelly Trail is considered one of the most scenic on the mountain.

In 1903, he mounted a Carnegie-funded archeological dig with his son at the Anau mounds in Turkmenistan. (Not far from the site of Gonur Tepe, famously excavated over 60 years later.)

He was a member of the New Hampshire Society of the Sons of the Revolution. He was president of the Geological Society of America in 1905.

Pumpelly died on August 10, 1923, aged 86, in Newport, Rhode Island.

=== Publications ===
- Pumpelly, A Mining Adventure in Arizona, Putnam's monthly magazine, page 494. (1869)
- Across America and Asia: Notes of a Five Years' Journey Around the World, and of Residence in ... (1870)
- Iron ores of Missouri and Michigan (1874)
- Explorations in Turkestan: With an Account of the Basin of Eastern Persia and Sistan. Expedition ... Explorations in Turkestan: With an Account of the Basin of Eastern Persia and Sistan. Expedition of 1903] Carnegie Institution Publication No. 26 (Washington, D.C.: Carnegie Institution, 1905)
- Explorations in Turkestan : Prehistoric Civilizations of Anau. Expedition of 1904, Carnegie Institution Publication No. 73, 2 vols. (Washington, D.C.: Carnegie Institution, 1908) Vol. 1 Vol. 2
- Travels and adventures of Raphael Pumpelly: Mining Engineer, Geologist, Archaeologist and Explorer (1920)
- My Reminiscences, Volume 1 (1918)
- My Reminiscences, Volume 2 (1918)
- Digital versions (page images) of books by Raphael Pumpelly are available at the Toyo Bunko Rare Books Archive of the Digital Silk Roads Project

=== Marriage and family ===
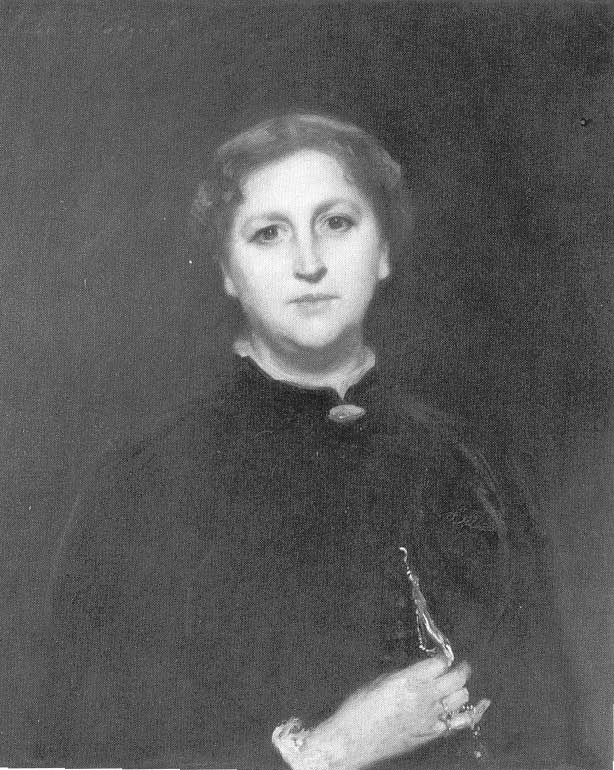
Mrs. Raphael Pumpelly (née Eliza Shepard), John Singer Sargent, 1887

He married on October 20, 1869, at Dorchester, Massachusetts, Eliza Frances Shepard, born March 14, 1840, in Dorchester, Massachusetts and died on February 5, 1915, in Newport, Rhode Island. She was the daughter of Otis Shepard and Ann Pope. Her sister, Rebecca Kettell Shepard married author and publisher George Haven Putnam, the eldest son of publisher George Palmer Putnam and Victorine Haven Putnam. Rebecca and George were the parents of medieval historian Bertha Haven Putnam. Another sister of hers, Lucy Elizabeth Shepard, married the Rev. Dr. Thomas Hill, the son of Thomas Hill, president of Antioch College from 1860 to 1862, and then of Harvard University from 1862 to 1868 and Henrietta Barker.

Raphael and Eliza were the parents of five children. Their daughter, Elise Pumpelly, married Thomas Handasyd Cabot, the son of James Elliot Cabot and Elizabeth Dwight. He was the great-grandson of Thomas Handasyd Perkins; and a grand nephew of William Morris Hunt, an American painter. Elise and Thomas were the parents of three children: Thomas Handasyd Cabot, Jr. Elizabeth Dwight Cabot who married Henry Holt, Jr., the son of Henry Holt, founder of Henry Holt and Company and Florence Taber, and Pauline Cabot who married George Pierce Metcalf, son of Stephen Olney Metcalf.

== Legacy ==
- The mineral pumpellyite, first described in Keweenaw County in the Upper Peninsula of Michigan, was named in his honor.
- The Pumpelly Trail on Mount Monadnock is named after him.
- A house in New Hampshire on his former summer estate remains known as Pumpelly Studio.
