= Pumpelly =

Pumpelly is a surname. Notable people with the surname include:

== People ==
- Raphael Pumpelly (1837–1923), American geologist and explorer
- Spencer Pumpelly (born 1974), American race car driver
- Augustus N. Gage, plaintiff in Gage v. Pumpelly

== Places ==
- Pumpelly Pillar, in Glacier National Park in the U.S. state of Montana
- Pumpelly Glacier, in Glacier National Park in the U.S. state of Montana
- Pumpelly Studio, house on the former summer estate of geologist Raphael Pumpelly
