= George Leavitt =

George Leavitt may refer to:

- George Baker Leavitt Sr. (1860–1925), mariner who captained several whaling vessels out of New Bedford, Massachusetts
- George Ayres Leavitt (1822–1888), founded several of New York's earliest publishing firms
