= Corinna Putnam Smith =

American archaeologist (1876–1965)

Corinna Putnam Smith (born, Corinna Haven Putnam; later, Corinna Lindon Smith; September 27, 1876 – died 1965) was an American writer, amateur archaeologist, scholar of Arabic and Islam, and an activist.

== Life ==
Corinna Haven Putnam was born in New York, September 27, 1876. She was the daughter of the publisher George Haven Putnam. In 1898, she met the painter Joseph Lindon Smith whom she married in 1899. Together, they spent many winters on archaeological sites in Egypt, while the summer months saw them hosting large social events in Dublin, New Hampshire, attended by the likes of Mark Twain and John Singer Sargent. After the death of her husband in 1950, she adopted his middle name, calling herself "Corinna Lindon Smith".

== Publications ==
- Rising Above the Ruins in France: An Account of the Progress Made Since the Armistice in the Devastated Regions in Reestablishing Industrial Activities and the Normal Life of the People, New York and London, G.P. Putnam's Sons 1920 (with Caroline R. Hill)
- (Editor of:) Joseph Lindon Smith, Tombs, Temples, and Ancient Art, Norman, University of Oklahoma Press 1956
- Interesting People: Eighty Years With the Great and Near Great, Norman, University of Oklahoma Press 1962
