= New York Center for Independent Publishing =

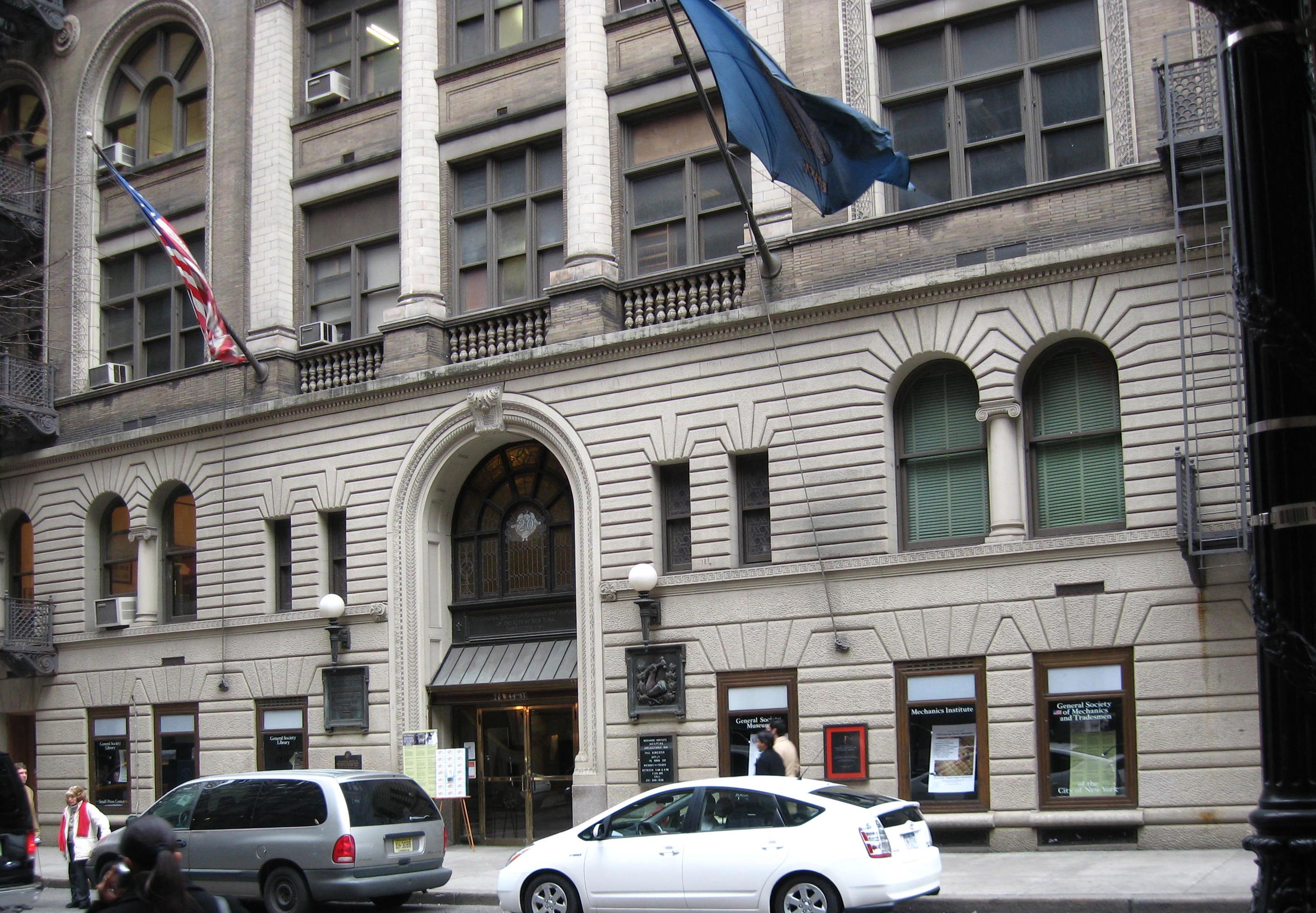
New York Center for Independent Publishing

The New York Center for Independent Publishing is located on New York's "Literary Row" at 20 West 44th Street in Midtown Manhattan. Formerly the Small Press Center, the Center was founded by Whitney North Seymour, Jr. in 1984. The Center's historical seedbed as the home of independent publishing dates back to 1831, when James Harper, one of the original four Harper Brothers, joined as a member of the General Society of Mechanics and Tradesmen of the City of New York, which has housed the Center since its inception. Other early printer and publisher members include John Bishop Putnam, James J. Little and Benjamin Collins.

The Center provides access to education and expertise in the field of independent publishing, networking opportunities, workshops, teleseminars, lectures, its annual small press book fair and exhibits. The Center also houses The Crouse Library for Publishing Arts, a comprehensive collection of books (many rare and out of print) and other materials on the bookselling and publishing industries.

The Center's annual signature programs include: the Independent and Small Press Book Fair; National Small Press Month, and its host of reading marathons, lectures, and publishing workshops; the New York Round Table Writers’ Conference; and the series, Emerging Voices: Writers Published by Groundbreaking Independent Presses. In addition to such public programs, each year the Center awards the coveted Poor Richard Award to an independent Publisher who has made an outstanding contribution to the field of independent publishing. Past recipients include: Barney Rosset, André Schiffrin, Peter Workman, Esther Margolis and Bill Henderson.

The Center is an educational program of the General Society of Mechanics and Tradesmen of the City of New York, located at 20 West 44th Street, between 5th and 6th Avenues in midtown Manhattan.
