= Joseph Lindon Smith =

American painter

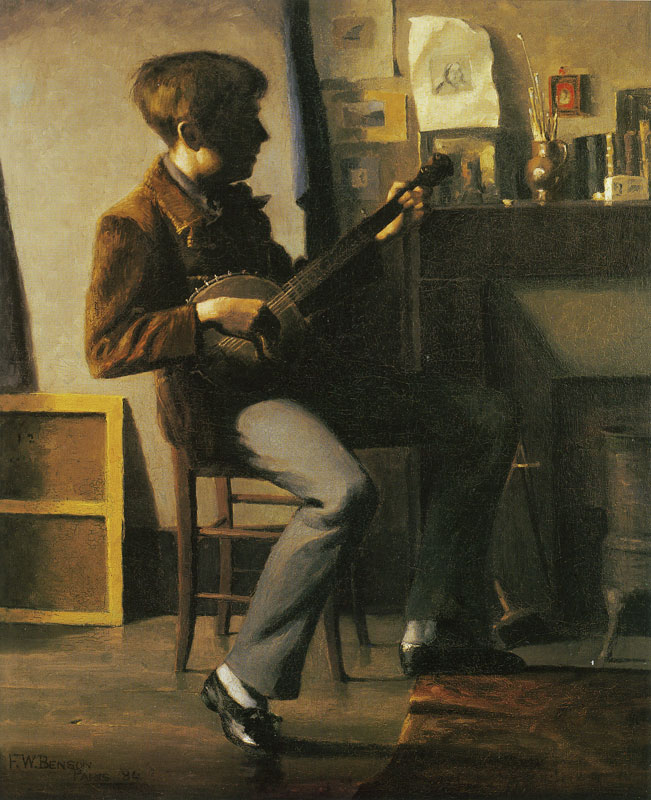
- Portrait of Joseph Lindon Smith by Frank Weston Benson, 1884, Private collection
- Born: October 11, 1863; Pawtucket, Rhode Island, U.S.
- Died: October 18, 1950 (aged 87)
- Education: Tufts University
- Movement: Orientalist

Joseph Lindon Smith (October 11, 1863 – October 18, 1950), was an American painter, best known for his extraordinarily faithful and lively representations of antiquities, especially Egyptian tomb reliefs. He was a founding member of the art colony at Dublin, New Hampshire.

== Background ==
Smith was born in Pawtucket, Rhode Island, on October 11, 1863, to Henry Francis Smith, a wholesale lumberman, and Emma Greenleaf Smith. Interested in studying art, he was schooled at the School of the Museum of Fine Arts, Boston.

In the fall of 1883, Smith sailed to Paris with his friend and fellow student at the School of the Museum of Fine Arts in Boston, Frank Weston Benson; They shared an apartment in Paris while they studied at the Académie Julian (1883–85) under William-Adolphe Bouguereau, Jules Joseph Lefebvre, and Gustave Boulanger.

"The noise level in the Académie Julian is always at a constant rumble: the scraping of benches on the floor as the artists jockey for a better view of the model, the lively banter of dozens of young men in three or four different languages, the swish and dab of brushes against canvas. The air in the studio is warm and full of the mingled scents of linseed oil and turpentine, damp wool jackets and the smoke from pipes and cigarettes. In one corner Frank Benson concentrates on putting the finishing touches to a portrait of the model, a gaunt old man. Wiping his brush on his smock, he waves to his friend, Joseph Lindon Smith, and they race down three flights of stairs to breathe the fresh air. That evening, over a meager meal in their fourth-floor rooms on Paris’s Right Bank, the two make plans to get out of the city for a weekend."

Smith spent several years traveling in Greece and Italy, often in company with his friend, the American painter Frank Weston Benson, who painted a memorable portrait of the young Smith (1884). While in Venice on one of these excursions, Smith met Isabella Stewart Gardner (1840–1924), who became a lifelong friend and supporter.

== Marriage ==
In 1899, Smith married Corinna Haven Putnam, daughter of the publisher George Haven Putnam. For decades they spent the winter months in Egypt or Latin America and the summer months in Dublin, New Hampshire, on the shores of Dublin Pond.

Corinna Lindon Smith wrote a personal memoir, Interesting People: Eighty Years with the Great and Nearly Great, which is regarded as an important source of material on the influential people in the arts of her day, especially writers and publishers.

== Egyptian influence ==
In 1898, Smith decided on a whim to visit Egypt. His paintings of Nile scenes and antiquities quickly brought him to the attention of Phoebe Hearst, who was underwriting excavations at Giza for the University of California, and Dr. George Andrew Reisner, the director of the expedition who was later to become a professor of Egyptology at Harvard University and curator of the Egyptian collections at the Museum of Fine Arts, Boston. Reisner and other archaeologists enlisted Smith to document the fragile wall paintings in tombs that were just then coming to light.

He kept a diary of his travels in Egypt. His memoir, Tombs, Temples, and Ancient Art, was published after his death, on October 19, 1950. Edited by his wife, Corinna, the book is a riveting, first-hand account of the excavations at Giza and in the Valley of the Kings in their greatest period of discovery (1899–1950). Smith was often among the first to enter a newly discovered tomb and knew most of the personalities at work in the area, including Lord George Carnarvon, Howard Carter, Gaston Maspero, and Theodore M. Davis. In many cases, his paintings are the best surviving documentation of newly exposed, fragile antiquities, whose polychromy did not long survive the change of atmosphere.

== Dublin art colony ==
Smith's house at Loon Point formed an important nucleus of the Dublin Art Colony, whose regular members included the painters Abbott Thayer and Rockwell Kent, publishers Charles Scribner and Henry Holt and whose visitors included Isabella Stewart Gardner, poet Amy Lowell, Mark Twain, and painter John Singer Sargent.

Smith was noted in the community for his love of theatricals, and part of his Loon Point property was landscaped and decorated for these performances.

== Exhibitions ==
Joseph Lindon Smith: The Persepolis Paintings, The Oriental Institute of the University of Chicago.

== Museums ==
Smith's works are among many collections. The museums with significant holdings include:

- Fitchburg Art Museum
- Isabella Stewart Gardner Museum
- Museum of Fine Arts, Boston
- Harvard Art Museums, formerly The Fogg Museum, at Harvard University.
