= Bertha Putnam =

American historian

Bertha Haven Putnam (1872 – February 26, 1960) was an American historian, specialising on the judicial and administrative history of medieval England.

Putnam grew up in Philadelphia, the daughter of George Haven Putnam, author and publisher, and son of the publisher George Palmer Putnam. She attended Bryn Mawr College, and got her bachelor's degree in 1893. She later taught at the Brearley School in New York City, before getting her doctorate from Columbia University in 1908. She started teaching at Mount Holyoke College in 1908, and was made professor in 1924. Here she remained until her retirement in 1937. Her career, from Bryn Mawr to Holyoke, ran parallel to that of Nellie Neilson, a fellow medievalist. She also worked closely with Eileen Power and Helen Cam. An attack of shingles left her partially blind in the late 1940s. Putnam died of arteriosclerosis in South Hadley, Massachusetts in 1960.

Her main focus was the office of the Justice of the Peace, and how it developed from the Conservator of the Peace in the early- to mid-14th century. In particular she proved the importance of the Statute of Labourers in giving these officers the right to decide cases, and thereby establishing them as justices. The change was sanctioned by the Statute of Westminster of 1361. Some of her main contentions, particularly that this process represented a radical devolution of judicial authority to the localities, have since been challenged.

== Bibliography ==
- The Enforcement of the Statutes of Labourers during the first decade after the Black Death, 1349-1359. (1908).
- Early Treatises on the Practice of the Justices of the Peace in the Fifteenth and Sixteenth Centuries. Clarendon Press: Oxford (1924).
- Kent Keepers of the Peace, 1316-1317. (ed., 1933)
- Yorkshire Sessions of the Peace, 1361-1364. (ed., 1939)
- The Place in Legal History of Sir William Shareshull, Chief Justice of the King's Bench, 1350-1361: A Study of Judicial & Administrative Methods in the Reign of Edward III. Cambridge University Press: Cambridge (1950)

== Sources ==
- Hastings, Margaret and Elisabeth G. Kimball; Kimball, Elisabeth G. (Spring 1979). "Two Distinguished Medievalists - Nellie Neilson and Bertha Putnam". The Journal of British Studies. 18 (2): 142–159. doi:10.1086/385741. JSTOR 175516. (Login required)
- Musson, A. and W.A. Omrod (1999). The Evolution of English Justice. Basingstoke: Macmillan. ISBN 978-0-333-67670-7.
- Scanlon, Jennifer (1996). American Women Historians, 1700s-1990s: A Biographical Dictionary. Westport, Conn.: Greenwood Press. p. 182. ISBN 978-0-313-29664-2.
