= John Geoghegan =

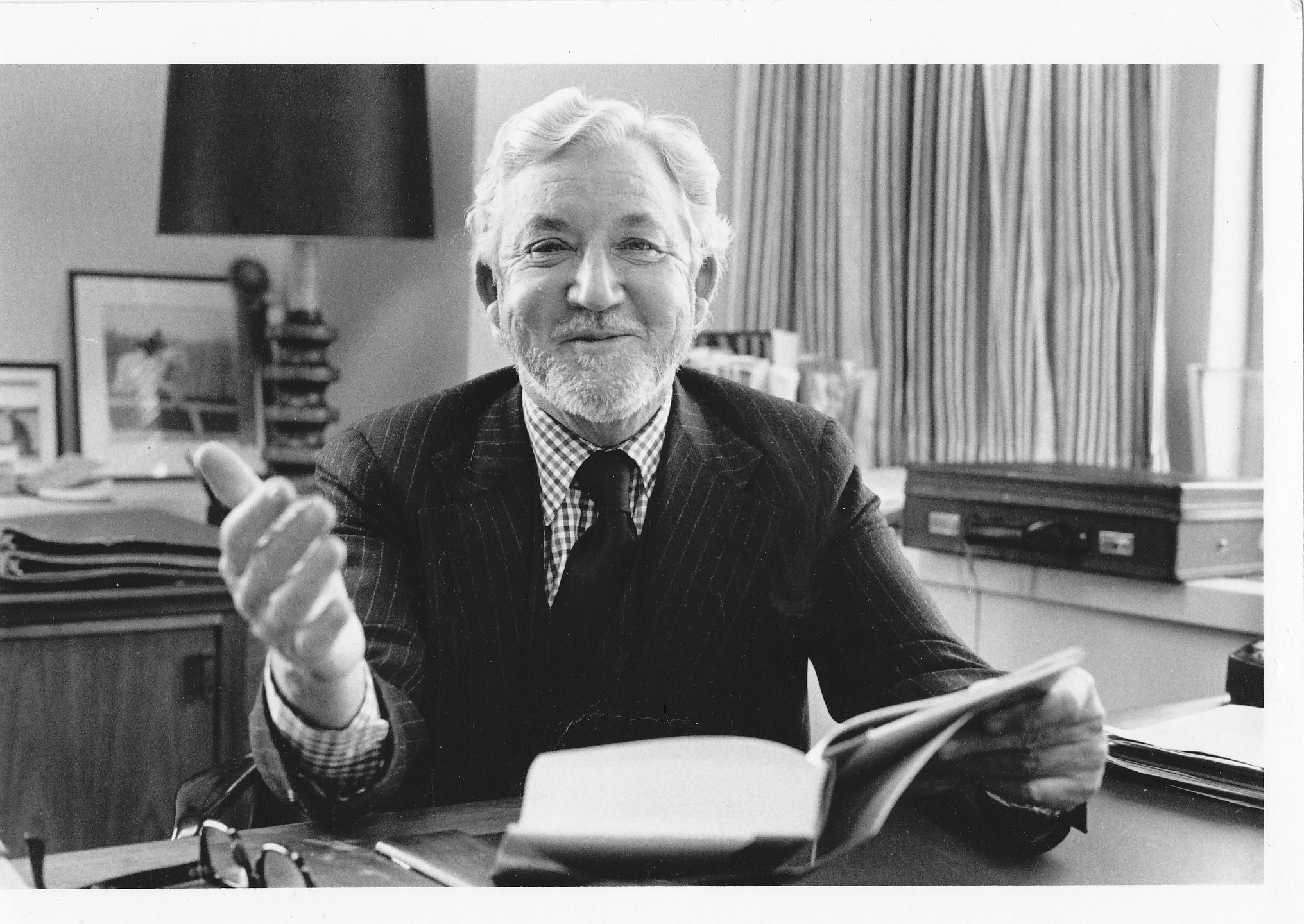
- Geoghegan in his office
- Born: 1917; Philadelphia, US
- Died: December 28, 1999 (aged 81–82); Walnut Creek, California, US
- Occupation: Publisher
- Military career
- Service years: 1942-1945

Editor in Chief at Coward-McCann
- In office 1959–1961

President then Chairman at Coward-McCann
- In office 1961–1981

John Geoghegan (1917 – December 28, 1999) was an American publisher.

== Early life ==
Geoghegan was born in Philadelphia.

== Career ==
Geoghegan started his career as a book salesman, a job he did for 14 years.

He served in the United States Army Air Corps from 1942 to 1945.

In 1959, Geoghegan joined the publishers Coward-McCann in 1959 as editor-in-chief, and in 1961, became president, and then chairman. The company later became Coward, McCann & Geoghegan, and he was chairman until his resignation in 1981, over the corporate business school mentality that was coming to dominate publishing. Afterwards, he was an editor-at-large at William Morrow and Company from 1981 to 1982.

He and the literary scout Lena Wickman are credited with "discovering" John le Carré and his debut novel The Spy Who Came In From The Cold.

== Personal life ==
Geoghegan died on December 28, 1999, in a hospital in Walnut Creek, California, of complications from a brain aneurysm.

He was married to Carole, and had a daughter, Maggie Geoghegan-Bedecarre; three sons, Michael, Peter, and John; and a stepson, Arthur E. de Cordova III.
