= Women's Medical Association of New York City =

Women's Medical Association of New York City is an organization of female physicians and medical students, with a mission to "provide communication, information, and educational programs for women in the medical profession, along with financial assistance to women medical students and researchers." It was charted by the state of New York in November 1909.

== Background and history ==
The Women's Medical Association of New York City grew out of the alumnae association of the Women's Medical College of the New York Infirmary for Women and Children It was established by Dr. Elizabeth Blackwell in 1854 as the first hospital in the United States to be staffed completely by women. In educating female physicians, the Women's Medical College not only provided women access to the medical profession, but also medical care. In a meeting at the Union League Club of New York in March 1878, Robert B. Roosevelt suggested that the "deplorable health of women was owing to a want of proper medical advice. The sympathy of women for one another enabled the female physician to penetrate to the very source of the disease. Nothing was hidden from her through motives of delicacy. Mountains of headgear, thin-soled shoes, glove-fitting and shape-destroying corsets no doubt have considerable influence in producing general ill-health among women; but he was persuaded that the lack of medical adviser of their own sex had been the leading cause." Dr. Mary Putnam Jacobi spoke at the same meeting, and stated that the aim of the association was to put "the medical education of women on an equality with that of male students."

The Alumnae Association was formed in 1870, and included both graduates of the Medical College and other female physicians in the New York City area. This association became WMA-NYC in 1899 with the closing of the Women's Medical College. WMA-NYC was chartered by New York State in 1909 and became branch #14 of the American Medical Women's Association in 1933.
