= Loyal Publication Society =

American pro-Union organization

The Loyal Publication Society was an American pro-Union organization. It was founded in 1863, during a time when the Union Army had suffered many reverses in the Civil War. The purpose of the society was to bolster public support for the Union effort, by disseminating pro-Union news articles and editorials to newspapers around the country.

There were two such societies: the Loyal Publication Society of New York and the Boston-based New England Loyal Publication Society, both founded in early 1863. These two organizations were similar to the Union Leagues that cropped up throughout the North, in that they provided civilians an opportunity to support the war effort. The Union League of Philadelphia was also involved in the development of pro-Union publications.

The founders and members represented the literary and financial elite of Boston and New York. In New York, they included Charles King, president of Columbia University, Sinclair Tousey, president of the American News Company, the publisher George Palmer Putnam, the German-born academic Francis Lieber, and the future vice-president of the United States Levi P. Morton. In Boston, the members included Charles Eliot Norton, the Harvard professor and prominent cultural critic, John Murray Forbes, a railroad magnate, and James Bradley Thayer, who was to become one of the country's foremost legal scholars.

In their first months, these groups would share the responsibility of reading newspapers to identify particularly useful articles and editorials. They would then contact the editors—before the type had been broken up—and request that additional copies of that particular item be printed. These items would then be distributed to Union soldiers or to newspapers. As the war progressed, the societies began to write and publish their own broadsides, which included contributions from well-known persons such as Robert Dale Owen.
