= Jeff Roth (archivist) =

Jeff Roth is the archivist in charge of the New York Times clipping and photo archive, colloquially known as "the morgue". After working for a while at an airport, Roth joined the Times archive in 1993; the newspaper slowly reduced the number of its filing staff until he was the only one taking care of the archive. The archive exists in the sub-sub basement of the old International Herald Tribune building. In Obit, Roth described how the Times archive is still used to make obituaries.

Roth is a cousin of Ghislaine Maxwell, a British convicted sex offender. Roth attended a 2021 trial in which Maxwell was convicted of child sex trafficking. In June 2022, Roth described Maxwell as a "friend and confidant" in a letter filed in Manhattan Federal Court by Maxwell's attorneys.
