= Crouse Library for Publishing Arts =

Library

The Crouse Library for Publishing Arts contains a comprehensive collection of books, periodicals, reports, and other materials on the bookselling and publishing industries. Scholars have called it "an important [collection] that aids our understanding of the book trade as a profession."

Prior to 1989, much of the collection was housed in the Graduate Library of the City University of New York. Currently, the collection is housed at the New York Center for Independent Publishing, which is, itself, a part of the venerable General Society of Mechanics and Tradesmen of the City of New York.

The Library's holdings include approximately 3,000 volumes on all aspects of the industry. Contained in the collection are published works (many out-of-print) on such topics as bookselling; book design and production; trade, scholarly and children's book publishing; author/publisher relations; book collecting; censorship; and a wealth of biographies of luminaries of the book trade.

The Library was endowed by William H. Crouse, a successful technical writer for General Motors and McGraw-Hill.
