= George Ayres Leavitt =

American publisher and bookseller (1822–1888)

- Born: May 13, 1822; Haverhill, Massachusetts, U.S.
- Died: December 18, 1888 (aged 66); New York City, U.S.
- Burial place: Green-Wood Cemetery
- Occupations: Publisher; bookseller; auctioneer
- Organization(s): Leavitt & Allen, Geo. A. Leavitt & Co.
- Spouse: Mary Catherine Cooley (m. 1848)
- Children: 7
- Parent: Jonathan Leavitt

George Ayres Leavitt (May 13, 1822 – December 18, 1888) was the son of a Massachusetts bookbinder who founded several of New York's earliest publishing firms. George Leavitt subsequently founded his own publishing company, Leavitt & Allen, but it failed during a financial panic that swept the nation during the American Civil War. Leavitt later tried to reestablish himself as both publisher and fine arts auctioneers, founding one of the first upscale auction houses, and eventually retiring from the book industry entirely.

== Biography ==
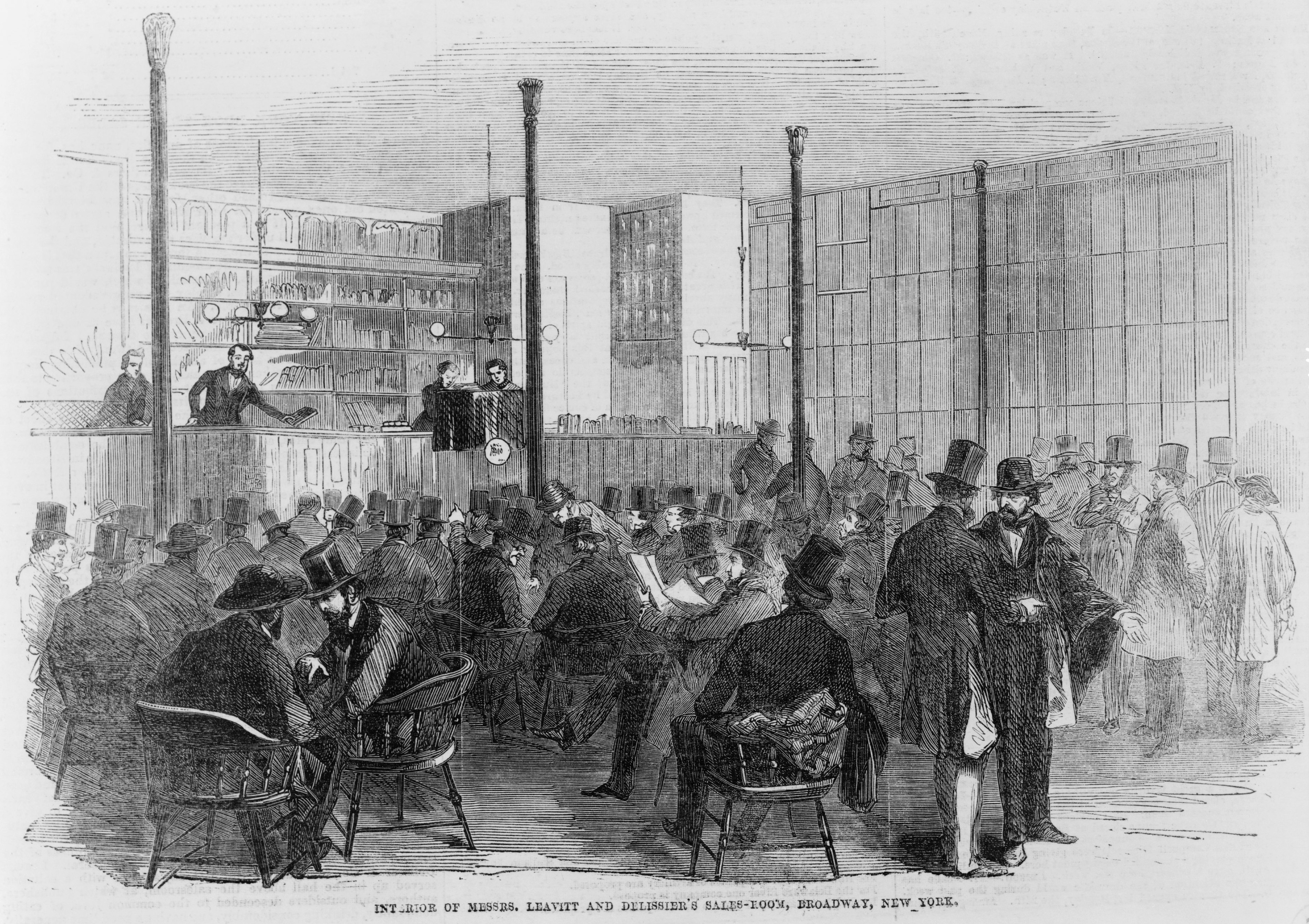
Book auction at sales room of Leavitt & Delissier, run by partner George Ayres Leavitt, Broadway, New York City, 1856

George A. Leavitt was born in 1822, in Haverhill, Massachusetts, the son of Jonathan Leavitt, who lived in Andover, Massachusetts, where the former bookbinder's apprentice operated an early publishing firm devoted to turning out religious works connected with the Andover Theological Seminary. Shortly after his son George's birth, Jonathan Leavitt left Andover for New York City, where he launched into business with his brother-in-law Daniel Appleton, a former Boston dry goods merchant. Their partnership lasted a decade, after which Leavitt founded the publishing house of Leavitt & Trow, which published the complete works of Jonathan Edwards, and became one of the country's largest publishing houses through its dominance of religious publishing. Helping Jonathan Leavitt build his business was his right-hand man, George Palmer Putnam, who eventually left for other better-paying opportunities. By 1842 George A. Leavitt, having graduated from Andover's Phillips Academy and worked for a time for the booksellers Robinson & Franklin, joined his father's publishing house. On his father Jonathan's death a decade later in 1852, Leavitt took over the firm and operated for year as a sole proprietorship, when he took on as partner his Andover classmate John K. Allen.

== Leavit & Allen ==
The firm renamed itself Leavitt & Allen and eventually settled at 379 Broadway in Lower Manhattan. The older name was 27 Dey Street in 1851. In 1856, Leavitt took the suggestion of his father-in-law James E. Cooley, one of New York's largest auctioneers, to open a trade book sale auction house. Although heir to one of earliest New York publishing houses, Leavitt eventually made his name as a bookseller and auctioneer, largely due to financial reverses. Until that year New York publishers had dealt with wholesalers in a system devoid of rules. Wearying of the inconsistencies, the publishers, including Leavitt, founded the New York Publishers' Association in an attempt to bring order to the topsy-turvy marketplace for books. One of the issues raised by the New York publishers was the role of itinerant booksellers who, the publishers complained, were able to sell their books directly to customers for far more than the New York publishers themselves could ask. On March 20, 1856, the Second Regular Trade Sale was held on the premises of the newly formed Leavitt, Delisser & Co., an auction house formed especially to handle the trade book sale.

By this time Leavitt's publishing interests had blossomed. Aside from the new auction house on the first floor, Leavitt's building in Broadway on what was then Dey Street. housed Leavitt's partner John F. Trow's printing operation on the building's upper floors. The publishing firm of Leavitt & Allen operated a store on the first floor, as well as occupying the building's basement. Leavitt had inherited a backstock of educational books from his father's firm, and he and his partner Allen continued to add to their stable of writers, which included Prof. John J. Owen, S.N. Sweet, Rev. Albert Barnes, Rev. John Chase Lord, Jonathan Edwards and others. Leavitt & Allen was particularly successful at sales of special occasion books and 'annuals', a category generating sales of up to 50,000 copies a year. Leavitt & Allen also published English poets, young people's books, writing and photograph albums.

By 1860 Leavitt's fortunes were rising, and the firms of Leavitt & Allen, publishers and booksellers, as well as Geo. A. Leavitt & Co. relocated to larger quarters at 24 Walker Street. Leavitt's auction partner Delisser had retired, and was replaced by Leavitt's friend James M. Alden. A year later the Leavitt interests relocated to 21 and 23 Mercer Street in Lower Manhattan, which were to remain the firm's premises for many years, and where it conducted its trade book sales.

=== After Civil War ===
In 1863, as the American Civil War raged, dragging many New York publishers into bankruptcy, George Leavitt became involved in a transaction that would change his business entirely. Leavitt & Allen did not exist after that time. The publishing firm of Geo. A. Leavitt & Co. found itself holding a large volume of commercial paper that was not honored in the marketplace. Following the resolution of the credit matter, most of the business that Leavitt and his father had built was wiped out. Leavitt's father-in-law Cooley took over the auction business, and the profitable book company was sold to meet the demands of creditors of Leavitt's auction house.

In the wake of the business failure, the partners dispersed. Leavitt became an auctioneer for James Cooley; James Alden left the industry; Leavitt's old partner Allen departed for the West Coast to start over. A chastened George Leavitt, publisher, became George Leavitt, auctioneer. By 1866 he had formed a partnership with his brother M.B. Leavitt and Robert M. Strebeigh in a new auction house called Leavitt, Strebeigh & Co. Three years later Strebeigh retired, and the house became known as the eponymous George A. Leavitt & Co.

Within four years Leavitt had found his financial footing again. His own partner Allen, having returned from the West Coast, helped Leavitt found another publishing and bookselling business, this time called Leavitt & Allen Bros., which continued for five years, when Allen left to help head up the American Bible Society, after which Leavitt renamed his business the World Publishing Co. But within a couple of years, the exigencies of the publishing industry, roiled by the Civil War, proved too demanding, and Leavitt sold his stock and retired from the bookselling and publishing industry entirely, instead concentrating on his auction house, which was for many years the largest fine arts and book auction business in New York City. A large part of Leavitt's business remained selling books to the trade from his former publishing competitors.

== Death ==
George A. Leavitt's brother M.B. Leavitt died in 1882, and six years later, on December 18, 1888, George Leavitt died in New York City. At the time of his death Leavitt was still active in his auction house of George A. Leavitt & Co. The list of artworks, antiquarian books and other items sold by Leavitt in his career as auctioneer is extensive. A partial listing was compiled for the period between 1873 and 1887. The funeral was held at the home at 802 Lexington Avenue that he shared with his wife Mary Catherine (Cooley) Leavitt, whom he had married in 1848. Although the couple had seven children, only a daughter and a son were alive when he died. The former publisher and auctioneer was interred at Green-Wood Cemetery in Brooklyn, with the burial oration delivered by Rev. E. Walpole Warren of Manhattan's Church of the Holy Trinity.

In noting Leavitt's death, The Publishers' Weekly devoted a long obituary to the publishing careers of Leavitt and his bookbinder father. "No man could ever have had a better friend than George A. Leavitt", wrote the bible of the publishing industry, "and that was probably the chief reason the deceased did not succeed as he deserved."

=== See also ===
- Jonathan Leavitt (publisher)

=== External links ===
Media related to George Ayres Leavitt at Wikimedia Commons

- Leavitt Catalogue (Library Spanning 1809 to 1826), Sale of Thomas Jefferson's Library, 1873, George Leavitt & Co., New York City, ThomasJefferson'sLibraries.com
- Automedon with the Horses of Achilles, Henri Regnault, 1868, Sale by George A. Leavitt & Co, 1882, Boston Museum of Fine Arts
- Library of a Bibliomaniac, George A. Leavitt, June 1, 1880
