= General Society of Mechanics and Tradesmen of the City of New York =

Educational and cultural association (founded 1785)

- General Society of Mechanics and Tradesmen
- U.S. National Register of Historic Places
- New York State Register of Historic Places
- New York City Landmark
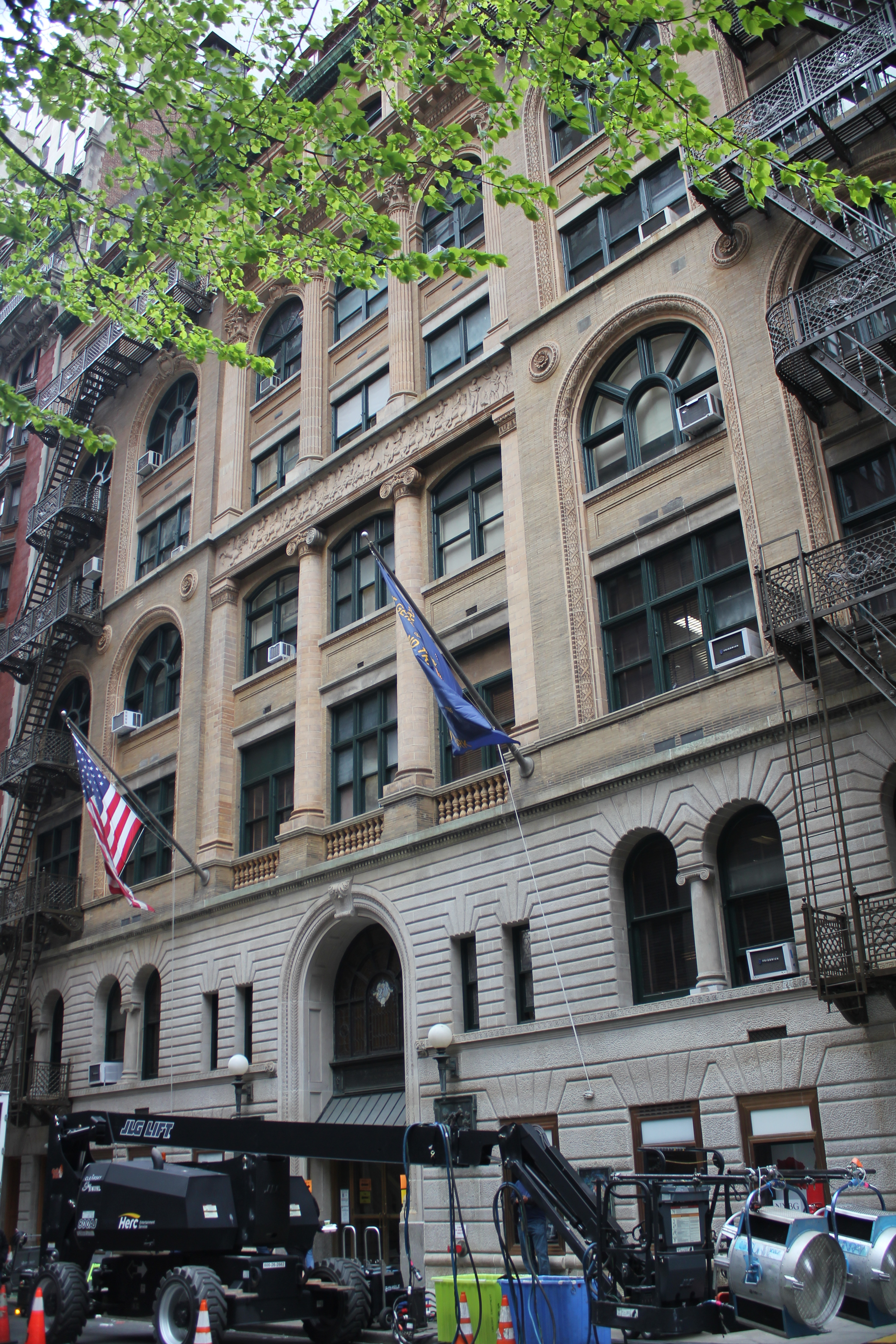
- General Society's Library Building
- Interactive map of General Society of Mechanics and Tradesmen
- Location: 20 W. 44th St., New York, New York
- Coordinates: 40°45′18″N 73°58′53″W
- Website: generalsociety.org
- NRHP reference No.: 08001048
- NYSRHP No.: 06101.000384
- NYCL No.: 1546

Significant dates
- Added to NRHP: November 12, 2008
- Designated NYSRHP: September 18, 2008
- Designated NYCL: October 18, 1988

The General Society of Mechanics and Tradesmen of the City of New York is an educational and cultural association at 20 West 44th Street in Midtown Manhattan, New York City. It was founded on November 17, 1785, by 22 men who gathered in Walter Heyer's public-house at No. 75 King Street (renamed Pine Street), one block from Wall Street, in Lower Manhattan. The aims of the General Society were to provide cultural, educational and social services to families of skilled craftsmen. The General Society during this early period celebrated the mutuality and centrality of the craft community. Besides its charitable activities, the society played a prominent part in the festivities that marked patriotic holidays, carrying banners emblazoned with its slogan 'By hammer and hand all arts do stand', echoing the motto of the Worshipful Company of Blacksmiths.

The city of New York and the Society both benefited from the decision to make New York the seat of the Federal Government. In 1789, legislators and their assistants and families began to pour into the city. Business prospects brightened considerably. In 1792, the Society attained a membership of 413, and received a charter of incorporation. Old documents reveal that the Society was quite active in the last years of the 18th century, corresponding with other business related associations, and petitioning the state legislature in the interests of industrial progress.

== Educational programing ==
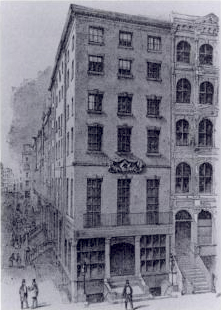
Mechanics' Hall, 1803

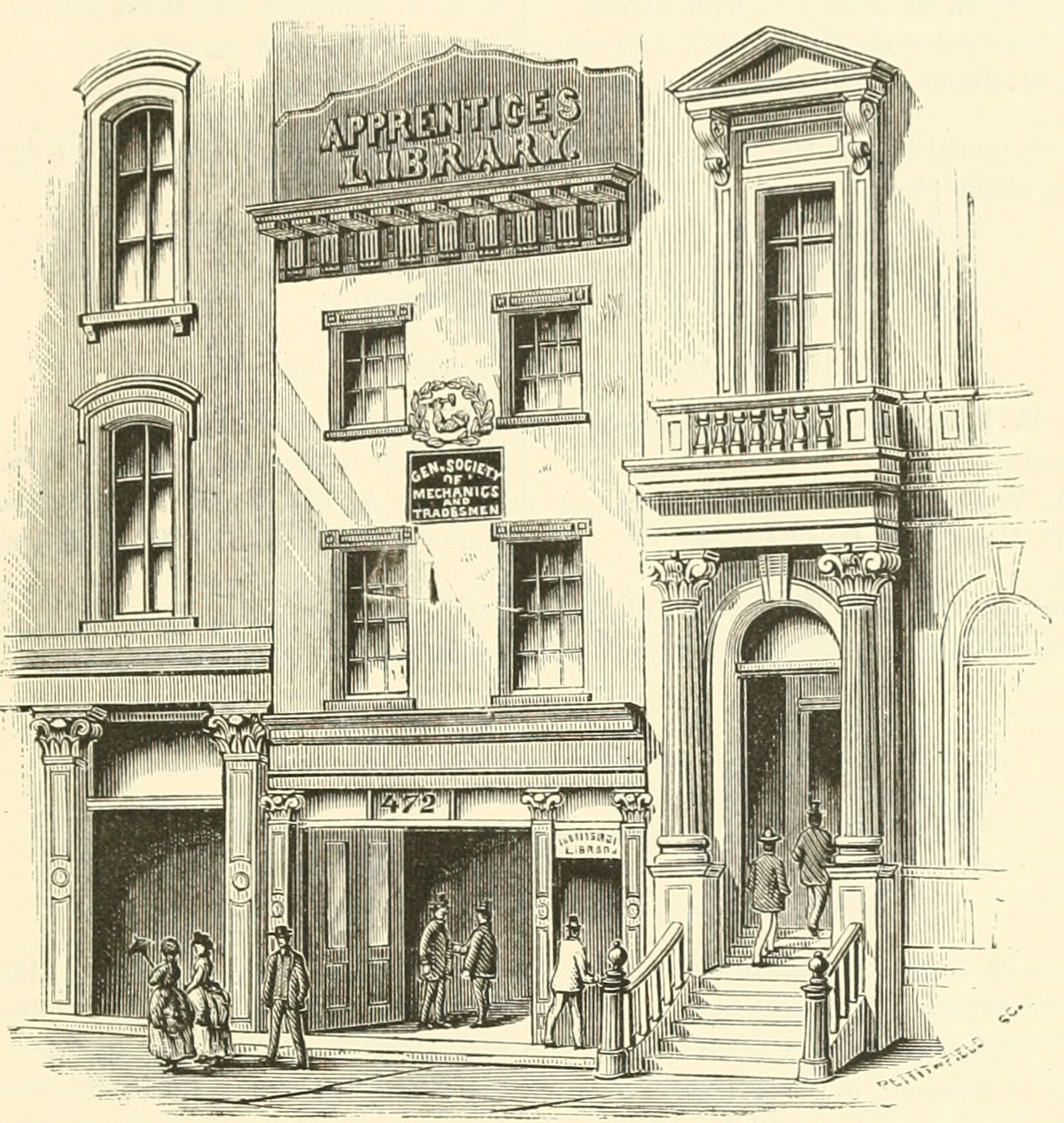
Apprentices' Library, 1870

In 1820, The General Society opened one of the city's first free schools. During the early 1800s, New York had no public school system and only two free schools were to be found in the whole city – one in the almshouse, and the other open only to the children of formerly enslaved Black Americans. The new school opened with 70 students. Children of members were admitted free of charge, and a small fee was required from all others. Later that same year the Society added a separate school for girls. The first school, which became the Mechanics Institute in 1858 following the Mechanics' Institute worldwide tradition, continues to provide tuition-free evening instruction in trades-related education. It is the oldest privately endowed tuition-free technical school in the city of New York, with more than 180,000 alumni.

=== Library ===
Also founded in 1820, the General Society Library is the second oldest in New York City. (Note: For context, see: List of libraries in 19th-century New York City) The Library's main reading room—which houses The Crouse Library for Publishing Arts—soars to a height of three stories topped by a magnificent skylight. The establishment of the Apprentices' Library put the Society well in the forefront of social reform. Later in the century there would be a great boom in libraries, and much thought would be directed toward public education, but in 1820 such ideas were still new, and the Apprentices' Library was one of the first public libraries in the city of New York. Its aim was to provide good and instructive reading for apprentice boys who worked all day, and had no other access to books and the library therefore kept evening hours.

In 1833, by amendment to its charter, the Society was authorized to increase its usefulness by reserving a portion of its income for the purposes of "promoting and disseminating literary and scientific knowledge," which was determined could be best done by means of lectures, and more recently, through the cultural and educational activities of the New York Center for Independent Publishing. The lecture series, which began in 1837—and continues today—featured such illuminaries as Ralph Waldo Emerson, Henry Ward Beecher, Horace Greeley, Wendell Phillips, and Rear – Admiral Robert E. Peary. Known today as the Labor, Landmarks and Literature Lecture Series, the series continues the Society's long tradition of public lectures.

It was during the 1830s that the French observer Chevalier made this comment about the American mechanic and tradesmen: "He dresses like a member of Congress, and his women-folk dress the same as those of a wealthy New York merchant. His house is warm, neat, and comfortable; his table almost as plentifully provided as that of the wealthiest fellow-citizen."

In 1878, the General Society opened the new Apprentices' Library at its headquarters at No. 18 East 16th Street ("on Sixteenth-street, near Union-square") to house its collection of 60,000 books, mostly "practical works in serviceable bindings" of use to its 8,000 members. These members of the Apprentices' Library included about 4,000 apprentices and 3,000 "girls in shops", along with members of the general public, who paid $2 per year, and General Society members. The building had room for up to 100,000 books and featured an on-site residence for the librarian and janitor.

=== College scholarships ===
During the 1840s the Society also provided college scholarships. It was decided that each year two students from Mechanics Institute would attend the University of the City of New York, free of charge. In addition, the society paid to send certain students to other schools.

The library continued to be well patronized during these years, and in 1845, Benjamin DeMilt, a watchmaker and former president of the Society, bequeathed his entire personal library to the Society, adding 1,800 volumes to the collection.

=== Social reform ===
The Society continued in its role as a pioneer in social reform by maintaining separate courses for women. In 1887, these classes for young women included stenography and typewriting – a very innovative idea at a time when few women were integrated into the office work force.

In 1861, when the Civil War broke out, the Society placed itself firmly behind the government of Abraham Lincoln. About $8,000 in government bonds were purchased and many Society members enlisted in the New York Volunteer Corps of Engineers.

== Location ==
In 1802, the Society bought a property at 239 Broadway and soon established Mechanics Hall there. In 1831 it moved to 30–36 Crosby Street and in 1843 moved again to the Crosby Street Annex at 472 Broadway. In 1877 it moved yet again to No. 18 Sixteenth Street where it had purchased land and built a new building.

In 1885, the Society celebrated its centennial with a banquet at Delmonico's Restaurant, which was well attended both by Society members and by public officials. The Society's growth continued, and in 1899 the organization moved to its fifth location at 20 West 44th Street.

Between 1899 and 1908, Andrew Carnegie, a Society member, contributed over half a million dollars to the Society. Generous gifts came in from other members as well, and by 1913 attendance at Mechanics Institute had reached 2,300. The curriculum then included such "mechanical age" courses as automobile drafting and industrial electricity.

The fifth home at 20 West 44th Street, across from the Harvard Club of New York City, is a New York City designated landmark and listed on the National Register of Historic Places. Originally designed by Lamb and Rich and constructed as the Berkeley School for Boys, the building was acquired by The General Society in 1899. Member and steel magnate Andrew Carnegie provided the funds to significantly expand the building in 1903. In order to accommodate more students, two wings were added to the rear and three new upper stories replaced an original fourth-floor gymnasium. The expansion was designed by Ralph S. Townsend and blends monumental Beaux Arts classicism with Renaissance elements.

== Museum ==
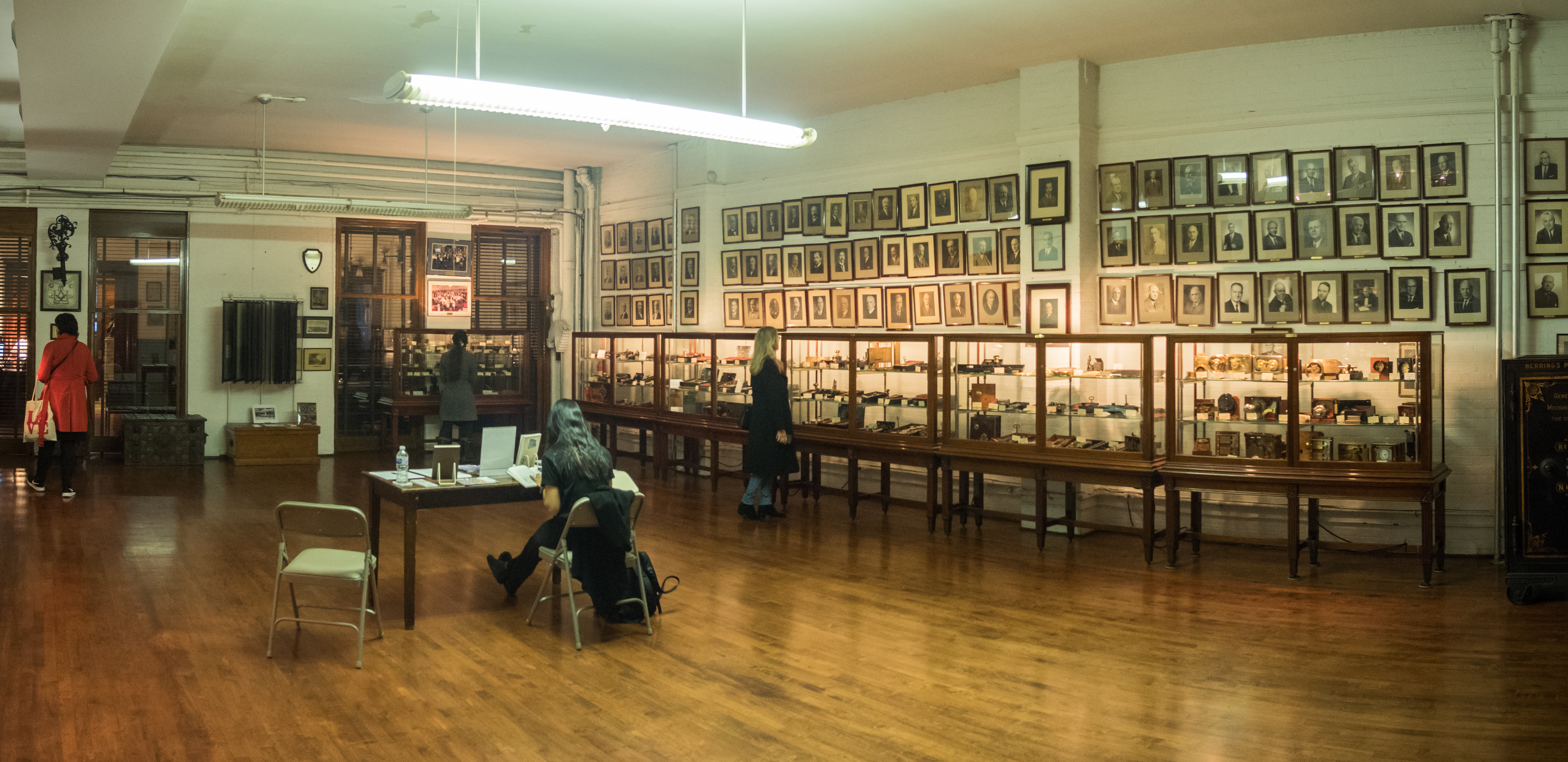
Mossman Lock Museum

The Society is also home to the John M. Mossman Lock Museum. The Mossman collection represents one of the most complete anthologies of bank and vault locks in the world, with more than 370 locks, keys and tools dating from 4000 BC to the modern 20th-century. The museum is open to the public.

== Notable members ==
Notable General Society members include Duncan Phyfe (furniture maker), James Harper (publisher, 66th mayor of NYC), Peter Cooper (inventor, industrialist), Nathaniel Currier (lithographer), John Bishop Putnam (printer and publisher), Andrew Carnegie (industrialist and philanthropist), Abram S. Hewitt (Glue Manufacturer, 87th mayor of NYC) and former presidents of the society: Stephen Allen (sailmaker, 55th mayor of NYC), Gideon Lee (shoemaker, 61st mayor of NYC), and Jacob Aaron Westervelt (shipbuilder, 72nd mayor of NYC).
