= Jonathan Leavitt (publisher) =

American publisher

- Born: January 20, 1797; Hampton Falls, New Hampshire, U.S.
- Died: May 6, 1852 (aged 55); New York City, U.S.
- Burial place: Green-Wood Cemetery
- Occupations: Publisher; bookseller; bookbinder
- Known for: Co-founder of Leavitt & Trow
- Spouses: Joan Ayres (m. 1820; died 1824) Louisa Adams (m. 1825)
- Children: 6, including George
- Relatives: Daniel Appleton (brother-in-law)

Jonathan Leavitt (January 20, 1797 – May 6, 1852) was a publisher, bookseller, and bookbinder who later co-founded the New York City publishing firm of Leavitt & Trow, one of the nation's first publishing houses. Leavitt was also co-founder of another early New York publishing house with his brother-in-law Daniel Appleton. George Palmer Putnam, who went on to found a New York publishing dynasty, received his first job from Leavitt. Eventually Jonathan Leavitt went into business on his own, and after his death the firm was run by his son George Ayres Leavitt.

== History ==
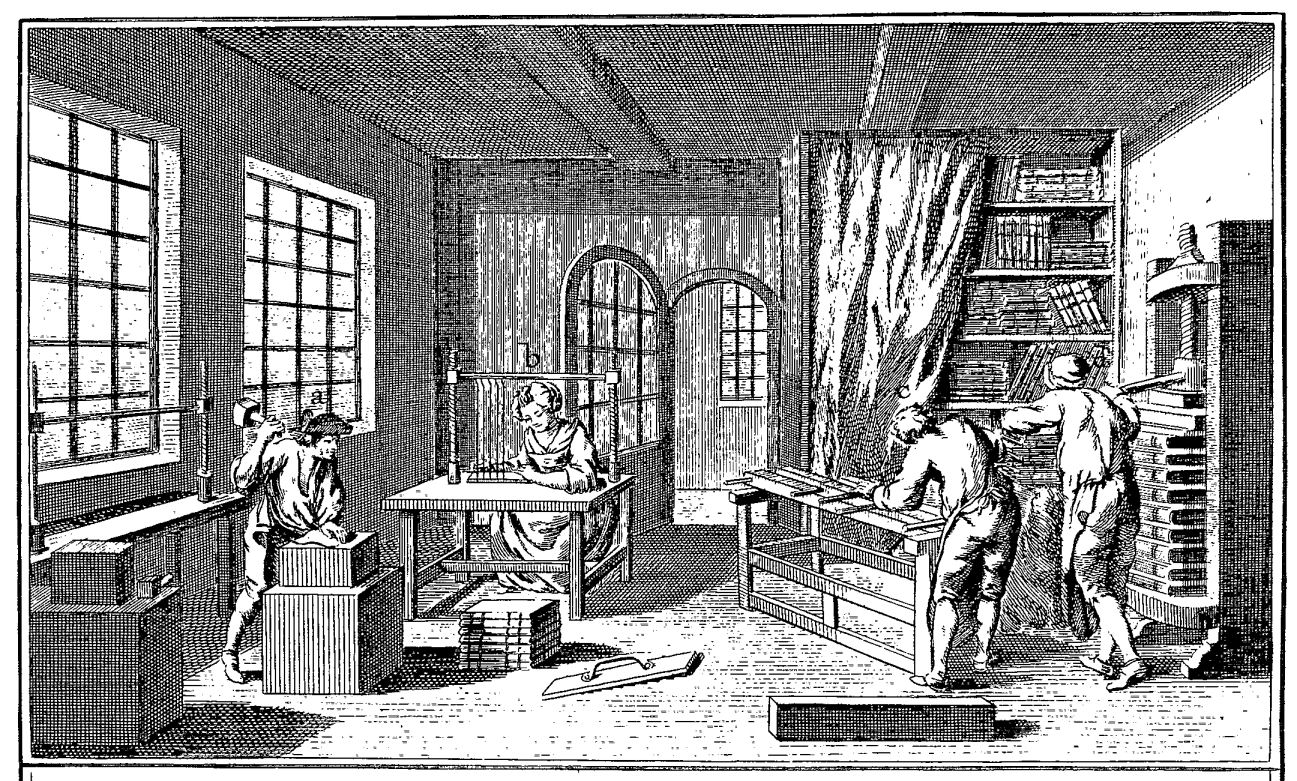
Early bookbindery. Jonathan Leavitt, publisher, began his career as apprentice bookbinder in Cambridge, Massachusetts.

Jonathan Leavitt was born in 1797 at Hampton Falls, New Hampshire likely to Simeon Leavitt and his wife Betty (née) Tuck. An obituary in The Publishers' Weekly for Jonathan Leavitt's son George Ayers Leavitt, who followed his father into the publishing industry, indicates a family association with Effingham Falls (now simply Effingham), New Hampshire. The New Hampshire town had once been named Leavitts Town, and was settled chiefly by members of the Leavitt family from Hampton, New Hampshire. Leavitt served as an apprentice bookbinder in Cambridge, Massachusetts and then moved to Andover, Massachusetts in 1812–13. In Andover, Leavitt and printers Abraham Gould and Timothy Flagg set up a press for the Andover Theological Seminary. Leavitt and his two partners continued to operate their printing and bookbinding operation after Leavitt decided to relocate after over a decade in Andover.

Leavitt married the former Joan Ayres at Haverhill, Massachusetts, on July 8, 1820 at the age of 23. Although most accounts give the name of Leavitt's wife as Joan Ayres – and Ayres was subsequently the middle name of Leavitt's son George, who took over his father's publishing business – Sidney Perley, in his authoritative The Essex Antiquarian, lists under the 'Adams Genealogy' the information that Major John Adams of Andover, Massachusetts, had daughters Louisa (who married 'Jonathan Leavitt') and Hannah (who married "Daniel Appleton of Haverhill' of "the Appleton Publishing House of New York City."). Leavitt's first wife Joan Ayer Leavitt died at Andover on November 7, 1824. On 7 December 1825, Jonathan married his second wife Louisa Adams who was born at Andover December 28, 1803 daughter of John and Dorcas (Faulkner) Adams. Louisa's sister Hannah was the wife of Daniel Appleton.

== New York City ==
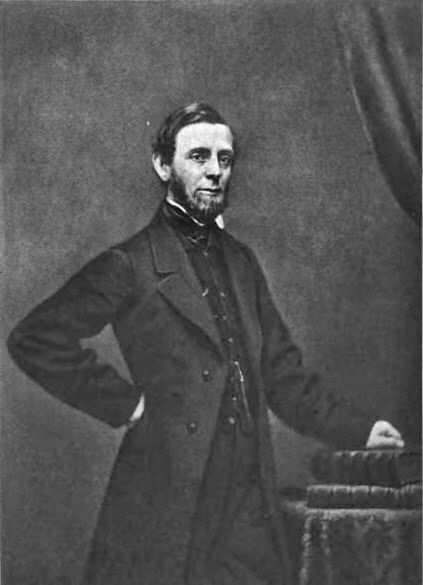
George Palmer Putnam, hired at 16 years old by Jonathan Leavitt as apprentice and right-hand man. Putnam went on to found a publishing powerhouse of his own.

In 1825, Leavitt moved to New York City and went into business with his brother-in-law Daniel Appleton, who formerly worked as a Boston dry goods merchant but who had founded D. Appleton & Co., a large store on Exchange Place opposite the Customs House, to sell books. Appleton put up the capital for the founding of a publishing business with his brother-in-law Leavitt. The store on Exchange Place was divided into two sections, with Appleton's son William later taking charge of the bookselling functions. After five years of partnership, and feeling he could continue his business without further capital infusions from his brother-in-law, Jonathan Leavitt went into business for himself, opening a store at Broadway and John Streets and hiring George Palmer Putnam (then aged 16) as his apprentice and right-hand man. Appleton and his son subsequently moved their business to what was known as Clinton Hall, on Beekman Street, where they established themselves as well-known booksellers. With his partnership with Appleton dissolved, Leavitt became the leading publisher of religious and theological works in New York city.

Leavitt also acted as publisher for his early employee Putnam, who went on to open his own eponymous publishing firm, which became an industry fixture. "Mr. Leavitt is willing to publish the volume I have compiled", Putnam wrote to a correspondent during his term of employment with Jonathan Leavitt, "as soon as he is satisfied that it will be acceptable with the public." In 1833, Leavitt publish Putnam's first book: Chronology, or An Introduction and Index to Universal History, Biography, and Useful Knowledge. The volume, which Putnam had first compiled for his own use, received a then-enormous printing run of 1,000 copies. The book's success, and Putnam's increasing usefulness to Leavitt's business caused the proprietor to advance him to a salary of two dollars per week, and within a few months to four dollars per week.

Broadway emerged early as center of the publishers who came to New York City, and Leavitt was among the pioneers of the business. Leavitt's brother-in-law Appleton had worked in the dry goods business in Boston, and took on management of the wholesale part of the new firm's printing business. Appleton later founded his own publishing firm, which later grew into one of the industry's largest, nearby at 200 Broadway.

== John F. Trow & Co. ==
In 1840, Leavitt became partners with fellow Andover native John F. Trow, a veteran of the Andover publishing firm Leavitt had helped found: Flagg & Gould, operator of the Codman Press. The pair of Andover men founded two publishing firms – both located at 191 Broadway in Lower Manhattan. They founded John F. Trow & Co., as well a second firm under their combined names, Leavitt & Trow, to do publishing and bookselling.

From the beginning, the new firm published a wide array of books and pamphlets. In 1841, for instance, its presses turned out Merciful Rebukes: A Sermon Preached in the Rutgers Street Church, New York, on Friday, May 14, 1841, On Occasion of the National Fast Recommended by the President of the United States. Two years later, the firm published a more ambitious project: a four-volume set of the sermons and papers of Rev. Jonathan Edwards entitled The Works of President Edwards, in Four Volumes. The firm, with the experienced Trow in command of the printing end, also published the classical series of Prof. John J. Owen, which was wildly popular and went through several printings.

Leavitt's partner Trow was an early adapter of new printing technologies, and among the first to use power presses, then in 1840 a stereotype press as well. In 1843, the John F. Trow firm printed in 1843 Memoir of Mrs. Louisa Adams Leavitt by Rev. Asa Dodge Smith. Leavitt & Trow became a prominent presence on the early New York publishing landscape, not least because of partner Trow's familiarity with the latest printing technologies, but also due to his heavy involvement in the business. "Our business has the personal attention of ourselves", Trow wrote to the public in 1845, "and we trust by unwearied application to receive from our patrons and the public in general a continuance of their patronage." In 1847 the two Andover natives began publishing directories. (In the following years the Trow directories to New York became an established city institution). The pair were soon joined in the business by George Ayres Leavitt, Jonathan's son, who had recently graduated from Phillips Academy in Andover, and who had served an early apprenticeship with publishers Robinson & Franklin.

About 1848 the two founding partners split their interests: Trow returned to running his own company (primarily his increasingly lucrative directory business, which he largely invented); and Leavitt went into business with his son until his death. The firm retained the name Leavitt & Trow up until Jonathan Leavitt's death. George A. Leavitt continued his father's business as a sole proprietorship for a year until he joined forces with childhood playmate John K. Allen, who had been brought up in the publishing business.

== See also ==
- George Ayres Leavitt
