= Mary Putnam Jacobi =

American physician, educator, and activist (1842–1906)

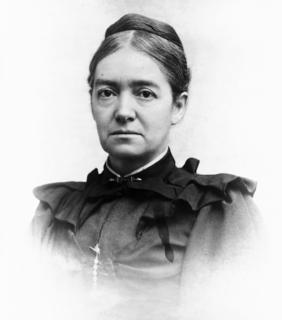
- Born: Mary Corinna Putnam; August 31, 1842; London, England, UK
- Died: June 10, 1906 (aged 63); New York City, New York, U.S.
- Education: Female Medical College of Pennsylvania; Faculté de Médecine de Paris
- Known for: Medicine
- Spouse: Abraham Jacobi (m. 1873)
- Children: 3
- Parent(s): George Palmer Putnam and Victorine Haven
- Family: George Haven Putnam, John Bishop Putnam, Herbert Putnam (brothers)

Mary Corinna Putnam Jacobi (née Putnam; August 31, 1842 – June 10, 1906) was an English-American physician, teacher, scientist, writer, and suffragist. She was the first woman admitted to study medicine at the University of Paris and the first woman to graduate from a pharmacy college in the United States.

Jacobi had a long career practicing medicine, teaching, writing, and advocating for women's rights, especially in medical education. Her scientific rebuttal of the popular idea that menstruation made women unsuited to education was influential in the fight for women's educational opportunities.

Jacobi was a founding member of the League for Political Education and the Women's Medical Association of New York City, and was inducted into the National Women's Hall of Fame in 1993.

== Early life ==
Jacobi was born Mary Corinna Putnam on August 31, 1842, in London, England. She was the daughter of an American father, George Palmer Putnam and British mother, Victorine Haven Putnam, originally from New York City. She was the oldest of eleven children. At the time of Jacobi's birth, the family lived in London because her father George was establishing a branch office for his New York City publishing company, Wiley & Putnam.

In 1848, at the age of six, Jacobi moved with her family from London to New York, where she spent the rest of her childhood and adolescence. Mary was educated at home by her mother before attending a private school in Yonkers. Later, she attended a public school for girls on 12th Street in Manhattan, from which she graduated in 1859. After graduating, she studied Greek, science, and medicine privately with Elizabeth Blackwell and others.

As a teenager, Jacobi published short stories in The Atlantic Monthly from the age of fifteen, and later in the New York Evening Post.

== Career ==
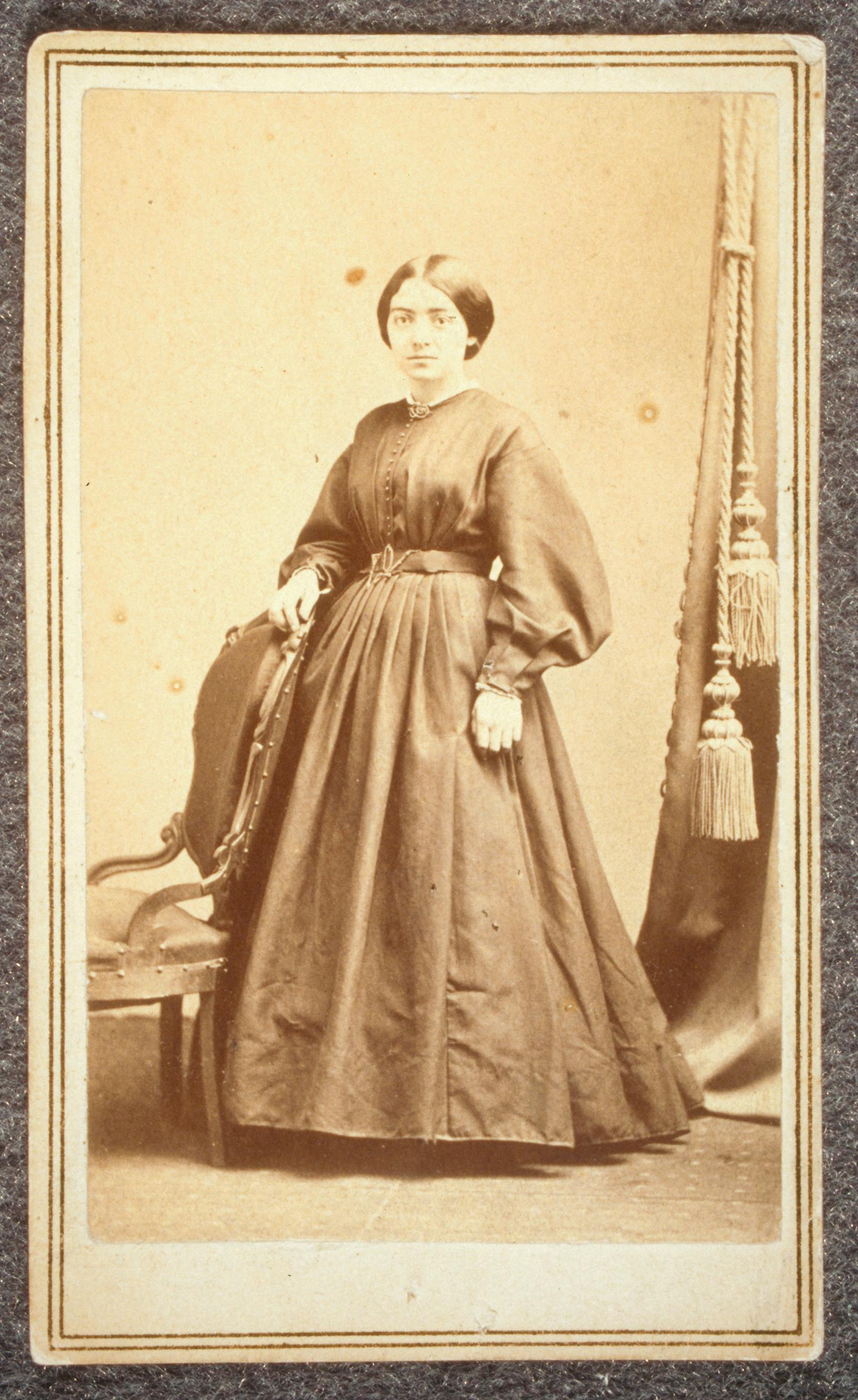
Portrait of Mary Putnam Jacobi, c. 1860–1865

=== Medical education ===
Although George Putnam believed a career in medicine was a "repulsive pursuit," he reluctantly agreed to financially support his daughter's decision to pursue medicine, an ambition she had held since childhood. In 1863, Jacobi graduated from the New York College of Pharmacy, which made her the first woman to graduate from an American school of pharmacy. In 1864, she earned her Doctor of Medicine from the Female Medical College of Pennsylvania. For several months, she practiced clinical medicine with Marie Zakrzewska and Lucy Sewall at the New England Hospital for Women and Children. She also served in the American Civil War as a medical aide.

During a short internship in which she studied clinical medicine at the New England Hospital for Women and Children, Jacobi decided to further her study of medicine and apply to École de Médecine of the University of Paris. After much negotiation and thanks to the help of the psychiatrist Benjamin Ball, in 1868 she was admitted as the first woman student at École de Médecine, although as a woman she was required to enter lectures through a separate door and sit at the front near the professor. In July 1871, Jacobi graduated with honors and was the second woman to receive a degree from École de Médecine of the University of Paris. (Elizabeth Garret Anderson was the first). Jacobi also received a bronze medal for her thesis. Her studies in Paris coincided with the Franco-Prussian War. In Scribner's Monthly of August 1871, she published an account of the new French political leadership that came to power following the war.

=== Medical practice and marriage ===
After five years of studying in Paris, Jacobi returned to the United States in the fall of 1871. Moving back to New York City, Jacobi established her own private medical practice. Jacobi also participated in research and became a professor in the new Women's Medical College of the New York Infirmary and Mount Sinai Hospital. Jacobi became the second woman member of the Medical Society of the County of New York, and was admitted to the American Medical Association. In 1872, she helped to found the Women's Medical Association of New York City, and served as its president from 1874 to 1903. She campaigned consistently for the admission of women to leading medical schools, including Johns Hopkins School of Medicine. Her teaching at the Medical College tended to exceed what her students were prepared for and led her to resign in 1888.

In 1873, she married Abraham Jacobi, a New York physician and researcher, nowadays often referred to as the "father of American pediatrics." They had three children, two daughters, and one son. The couple's first daughter died at birth and their only son died at the age of seven. Abraham and Mary had only one child who survived to adulthood, their daughter Marjorie Jacobi McAneny. Jacobi educated her daughter herself according to her own educational theories.

=== Writing ===
Jacobi received Harvard University's Boylston Prize in 1876 for an original essay, later published as a book, The Question of Rest for Women during Menstruation. She was the first woman to win the Boylston Prize. Jacobi's essay was a response to Dr. Edward H. Clarke's earlier publication, Sex in Education; or, A Fair Chance for the Girls (1875), a book claiming that any physical or mental exertion during menstruation could lead to women becoming infertile. Jacobi did not believe this was the case, and to test the idea she collected extensive physiological data on women throughout their menstrual cycle, including muscle strength tests before and after menstruation. She concluded that "there is nothing in the nature of menstruation to imply the necessity, or even desirability, of rest."

Jacobi wrote more than 120 medical articles and nine books, although she stopped writing fiction in 1871. In 1891 she contributed a paper on the history of women physicians in the United States, titled "Woman in Medicine," to the volume Women's Work in America (1891, edited by Annie Nathan Meyer), that included a bibliography of writings by American female physicians, mentioning more than forty of her own works. In 1894, she wrote Common Sense Applied to Women's Suffrage, which was later reprinted and used to support the women's suffrage movement in the United States. It expanded on an address she made in 1894 before a constitutional convention in Albany, and was reprinted in 1915 and contributed to the final successful push for women's suffrage. Also in 1894, after the defeat of the women's suffrage amendment to the New York State Constitution, Jacobi was one of six prominent suffragists who founded the League for Political Education.

While Elizabeth Blackwell (1821–1910) viewed medicine as a means for social and moral reform, the younger Jacobi focused on medicine as a biological science. Blackwell believed that women would succeed in medicine because of their humane feminine values, but Jacobi thought women's contribution stemmed from being especially well suited to scientific research.

== Death and legacy ==
After being diagnosed with a brain tumor, Jacobi documented her symptoms and published a paper on the subject titled Descriptions of the Early Symptoms of the Meningeal Tumor Compressing the Cerebellum. From Which the Writer Died. Written by Herself. She died in New York City on June 10, 1906. Jacobi is interred at Green-Wood Cemetery in Brooklyn, New York.

She was inducted into the National Women's Hall of Fame in 1993.

== Selected works ==
- De la graisse neutre et des acides gras (Paris thesis, 1871)
- The Question of Rest for Women during Menstruation (1876)
- Acute Fatty Degeneration of New Born (1878)
- The Value of Life (New York, 1879)
- Cold Pack and Anæmia (1880)
- The Prophylaxis of Insanity (1881)
- "Some Considerations on the Moral and on the Non Asylum Treatment of Insanity". In: Putnam Jacobi, Harris, Cleaves, et al. The Prevention of Insanity and the Early and Proper Treatment of the Insane (1882)
- "Studies in Endometritis" in the American Journal of Obstetrics (1885)
- Articles on "Infantile Paralysis" and "Pseudo-Muscular Hypertrophy" in Pepper's Archives of Medicine (1888)
- Hysteria, and other Essays (1888)
- Physiological Notes on Primary Education and the Study of Language (1889)
- "Common Sense" Applied to Women's Suffrage (1894) This expanded on an address she made that same year before a constitutional convention in Albany. It was reprinted in 1915 and contributed to the final successful push for women's suffrage.
- Found and Lost (1894)
- From Massachusetts to Turkey (1896)
- Description of the Early Symptoms of the Meningeal Tumor Compressing the Cerebellum. From Which the Writer Died. Written by Herself. (1906)
