= The New York Times Archival Library =

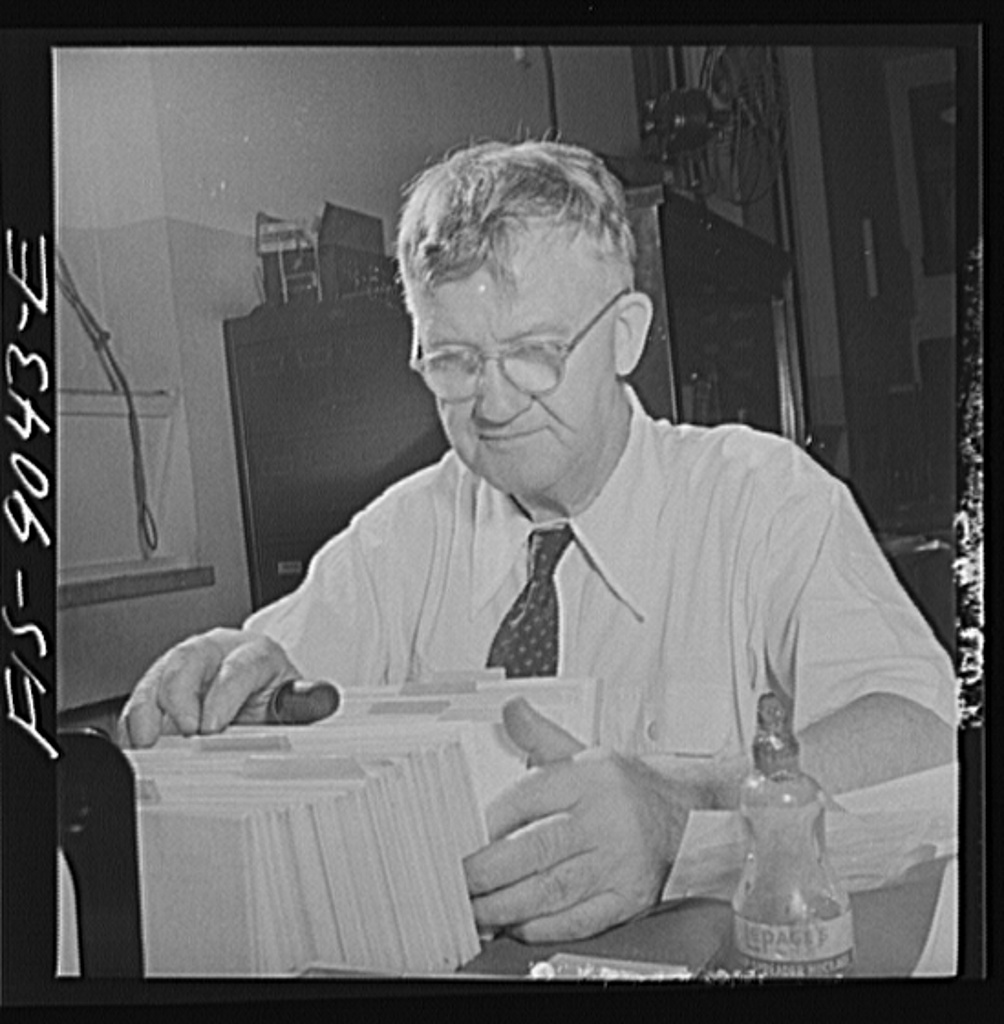
Tommy Bracken, head of the archive, working in 1942

The New York Times Archival Library, also known as "the morgue", is the collected clippings and photo archives of the New York Times (NYT) newspaper. It is located in a separate building from the main Times offices, in the basement of the former New York Herald Tribune on West 41st Street.

The archive was first created as a clipping library and morgue file under the direction of Carr Van Anda in 1907. Images were later added when the NYT art department's photo library was merged with the clippings collection. The archive stopped collecting clippings in June 1990, as the NYT use of electronic archives increased. Over time, sections of the collection have been sent to other repositories like the New York Public Library and the University of Texas as the newspaper relied on it less. The archive is now solely run by Jeff Roth, although other newspaper employees are digitizing the collections.

The morgue is also where the NYT holds its advance obituaries, written in preparation for the event of someone's death.

In 2007, NYT made large parts of their online archives freely accessible.

As of November 18, 2018, the images from the library are hosted on Google Cloud Platform.
