= George Haven Putnam =

American publisher (1844–1930)

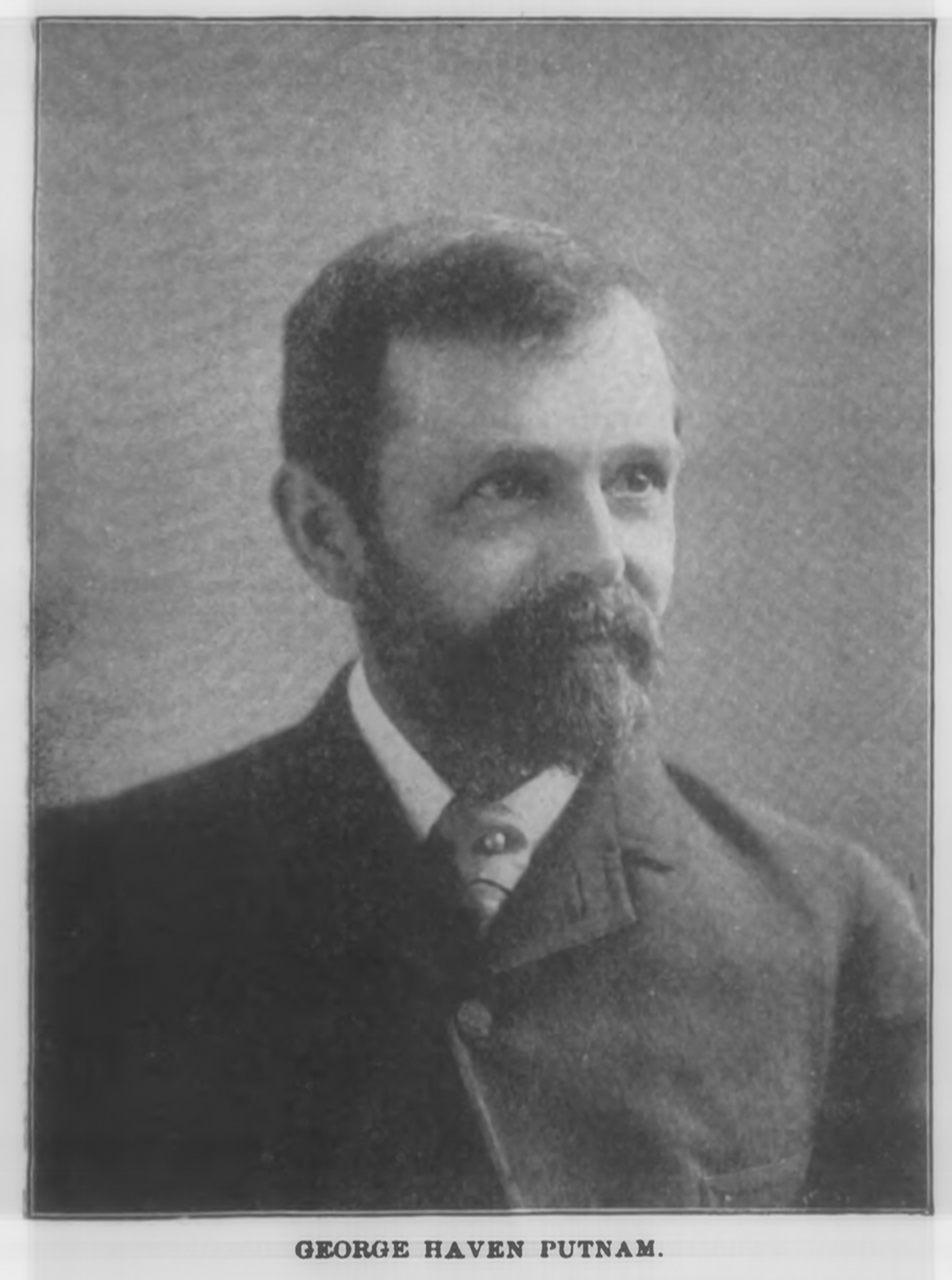
- Photo portrait, 1891
- Born: April 2, 1844; London, England
- Died: February 27, 1930 (aged 85)
- Education: Columbia College, 1861
- Occupations: Publisher; soldier; writer
- Known for: G. P. Putnam's Sons
- Spouse(s): Rebecca K. Shepard; Emily James Smith Putnam (m. 1899)
- Children: Dorothy Lesley Putnam; Ellen Putnam; Ethel Frothingham Putnam; Bertha Haven Putnam; Corinna Haven Putnam Smith; Palmer Cosslett Putnam
- Parent(s): George Palmer Putnam and Victorine Haven Putnam
- Family: (sister) Mary Corinna Putnam (brothers) John Bishop Putnam, Irving Putnam, Herbert Putnam

George Haven Putnam A.M., Litt.D. (April 2, 1844 – February 27, 1930) was an American publisher, soldier, and writer. He was the president of G. P. Putnam's Sons for its first 52 years, from 1872.

== Biography ==
The eldest son of publisher George Palmer Putnam and Victorine Haven Putnam, he was born in London, UK where his father had been living since 1841 while establishing a branch office for his New York City publishing company, Wiley & Putnam. In 1848 the family returned to the United States, settling at Stapleton, New York, on Staten Island. Haven's early instruction was at home by his mother and nurse. He was prepared for college, first, by the Rev. Dr. Stephen H. Tyng, who had a class of boys at St. George's Church, of which Dr. Tyng was rector, and his son, Stephen H. Tyng, Jr., instructor of a company of cadets. Haven next entered Starr's Military Academy, Yonkers, New York. In 1857 he attended Prof. John MacMullen's school in upper New York and the Columbia Grammar School conducted by Dr. Anthon after 1859.

He matriculated at Columbia College in 1861, but the condition of his eyes led his father to send him abroad to consult oculists in Paris and Berlin. In Berlin, Putnam placed himself under the care of Baron von Graefe, then the leading oculist of Europe. As his sight improved, he attended courses of lectures at the Sorbonne, Paris, devoted to French literature and the literature and history of Rome. At the advice of Baron von Graefe, he discontinued lectures after reaching Berlin and sought open-air environments as necessary to complete his treatment. He visited Bayard Taylor at Gotha and en route visited the galleries at Dresden, tramped through Saxony, Switzerland, studied Bohemian life at Prague, passed through the Black Forest region, saw the toymakers of Nuremberg, continued the tramp through the pleasant region of the Thuringian Forest and finally reached Göttingen, where he took up his studies at the University of Göttingen. However, with the outbreak of the American Civil War he left the university without graduating to return home to serve in the Union Army.

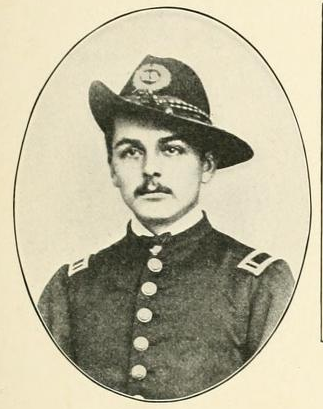
Lt George Putnam, 176th New York Infantry

Putnam enlisted as a private in the 176th New York Infantry Regiment in December 1862 and was promoted to Sergeant in January, 1863. He was captured at the Battle of LaFourche Crossing but was paroled to his regiment in August 1863. Promoted to First Lieutenant in December 1863 and Adjutant in March 1864, he was captured at the Battle of Cedar Creek near Middletown, Virginia, and was held for a short time at the notorious Libby Prison in Richmond, Virginia before being transferred to Danville where he was held until March 1865 when he was returned to the Union forces as part of a prisoner exchange. He attained the rank of major of volunteers. Years later, following the 1911 marking of the 50th anniversary of the outbreak of the war, in 1912 George H. Putnam published an account of his experiences titled "A Prisoner of War in Virginia - An Experience in Virginia Prisons During the Last Winter of the War."

At the war's end, Major Putnam joined his father's publishing business, "G. Putnam Broadway." He was also appointed deputy collector of internal revenue. On his father's death in 1872, George H. Putnam took over the business with his brothers John Bishop and Irving, renaming it G. P. Putnam's Sons. He was made president of the firm, a position he held for the next fifty-two years. In 1884 he hired 26-year-old Theodore Roosevelt as a special partner; Roosevelt would write several works published by Putnam.

Like his father, Putnam was active in numerous civic, social, and business causes. He served on the executive committees of the Civil-Service Reform Association, the Free-Trade League and the Reform Club, and was a founding member of the City Club of New York. He also aggressively continued with his father's work on copyright protection for authors. In 1887, he helped organize the American Publishers' Copyright League that led a successful campaign resulting in the 1891 passage of an international copyright protection law.

He retired in 1924, formally turning the presidency of G. P. Putnam's Sons over to Palmer C. Putnam. He died in 1930, aged 85.

=== Wives and children ===
Putnam was first married to Rebecca Kettel Shepard who died of typhoid fever in 1895. They had five daughters: Dorothy Lesley, Ellen, Ethel Frothingham, Bertha Haven and Corinna Haven. Bertha went on to become a noted medieval historian, and Corinna became the wife of Joseph Lindon Smith, painter of Egyptian archaeological discoveries.

Putnam married his second wife, the classical scholar Emily James Smith in 1899. A son of this marriage was wind power pioneer Palmer Cosslett Putnam.

== Writings ==
Putnam also wrote articles in scholarly and historical publications.

== Children's books ==
- The Artificial Mother (1894)
- The Little Gingerbread Man (1910)

== Other ==
- Authors and Publishers, by G. H. and J. B. Putnam (1882)
- Anecdotes of Luther and the Reformation (1883)
- Books and Their Makers During the Middle Ages, 2 vols. (1896, 1897)
- Washington Irving, His Life and Work (1903)
- Censorship of the Church of Rome and Its Influence Upon the Production and Distribution of Literature, Part 1 (1906)
- Abraham Lincoln (1909); also issued as Project Gutenberg eBook #11728
- A Prisoner of War in Virginia (1912)
- Memories of My Youth (1914)
- Memories of a Publisher (1915)
- Some Memories of the Civil War (1924)
