= Pumpelly Studio =

Historic house in New Hampshire, United States

- U.S. National Register of Historic Places
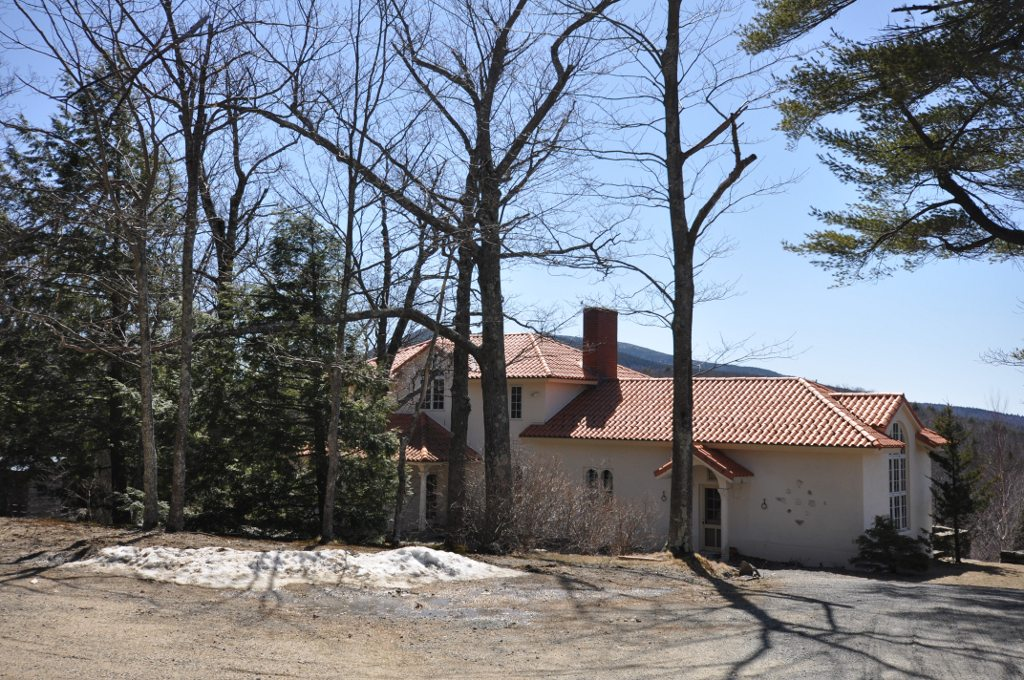

- Location within New Hampshire Location within the United States
- Location: Snow Hill Rd., Dublin, New Hampshire
- Coordinates: 42°53′56″N 72°4′13″W
- Area: 0.1 acres (0.040 ha)
- Built: 1912
- Architect: Walter Atherton
- Architectural style: Mediterranean Revival
- MPS: Dublin MRA
- NRHP reference No.: 83004069
- Added to NRHP: December 15, 1983

The Pumpelly Studio is the principal surviving house on the former summer estate of geologist Raphael Pumpelly. Located off Snow Hill Road in Dublin, New Hampshire, it is a distinctive local example of Mediterranean Romanesque, and a prominent surviving building from Dublin's heyday as a summer resort and artists' colony. The building, now a residence and studio, was listed on the National Register of Historic Places in 1983.

== Description and history ==
The Pumpelly Studio is located in a rural setting southwest of Dublin village, on the west side of Snow Hill Road. It is set on Snow Hill, a low ridge with views of Dublin Pond and the Pumpelly Ridge of Mount Monadnock to the west. It is a single-story structure, built out of steel and concrete, with a stucco finish and tiled hip roof. Stylistic elements include round-arch window and door openings, with a variety of other Classical and Romanesque stylistic details embedded in the walls.

The studio was designed by Walter Atherton and Margarita "Daisy" Pumpelly Smyth and built in 1912. It was built adjacent to the summer house of geologist Raphael Pumpelly, a large Shingle style structure that was built in 1883 and burned in 1922. The studio was built of steel and concrete, in part because it was intended to safely house Pumpelly's papers; these were lost when the main house burned. Notable visitors to the Pumpelly estate included dancer Martha Graham, who summered there in 1924, teaching dance classes in the studio. After Pumpelly's house burned, it was replaced by a house stylistically similar to the studio, but it burned down in 1979. A stylistically compatible cinder-block addition was made to the studio in 1961, designed by Pumpelly's grandson Thomas Handasyd Cabot Jr.

== See also ==
- National Register of Historic Places listings in Cheshire County, New Hampshire
