= George Palmer Putnam =

American publisher and author

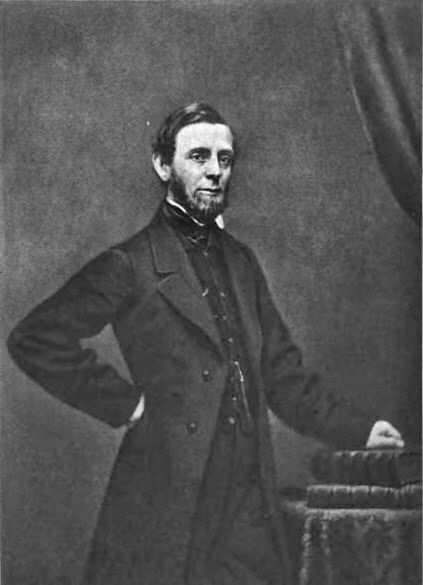
- Born: February 7, 1814; Brunswick, Maine, U.S.
- Died: December 20, 1872 (aged 58); New York City, U.S.
- Occupations: publisher, author
- Known for: Wiley & Putnam; G. Putnam Broadway; Putnam's Magazine
- Spouse: Victorine Haven
- Children: 11, including Mary Corinna Putnam (1842–1906); George Haven Putnam (1844–1930); John Bishop Putnam (1849–1915); Irving Putnam (1852–1931); Herbert Putnam (1861–1955)

George Palmer Putnam (February 7, 1814 – December 20, 1872) was an American publisher and author. He founded the firm G. P. Putnam's Sons and Putnam's Magazine. He was an advocate of international copyright reform, secretary for many years of the Publishers' Association, and founding superintendent of the Metropolitan Museum of Art.

== Early life ==
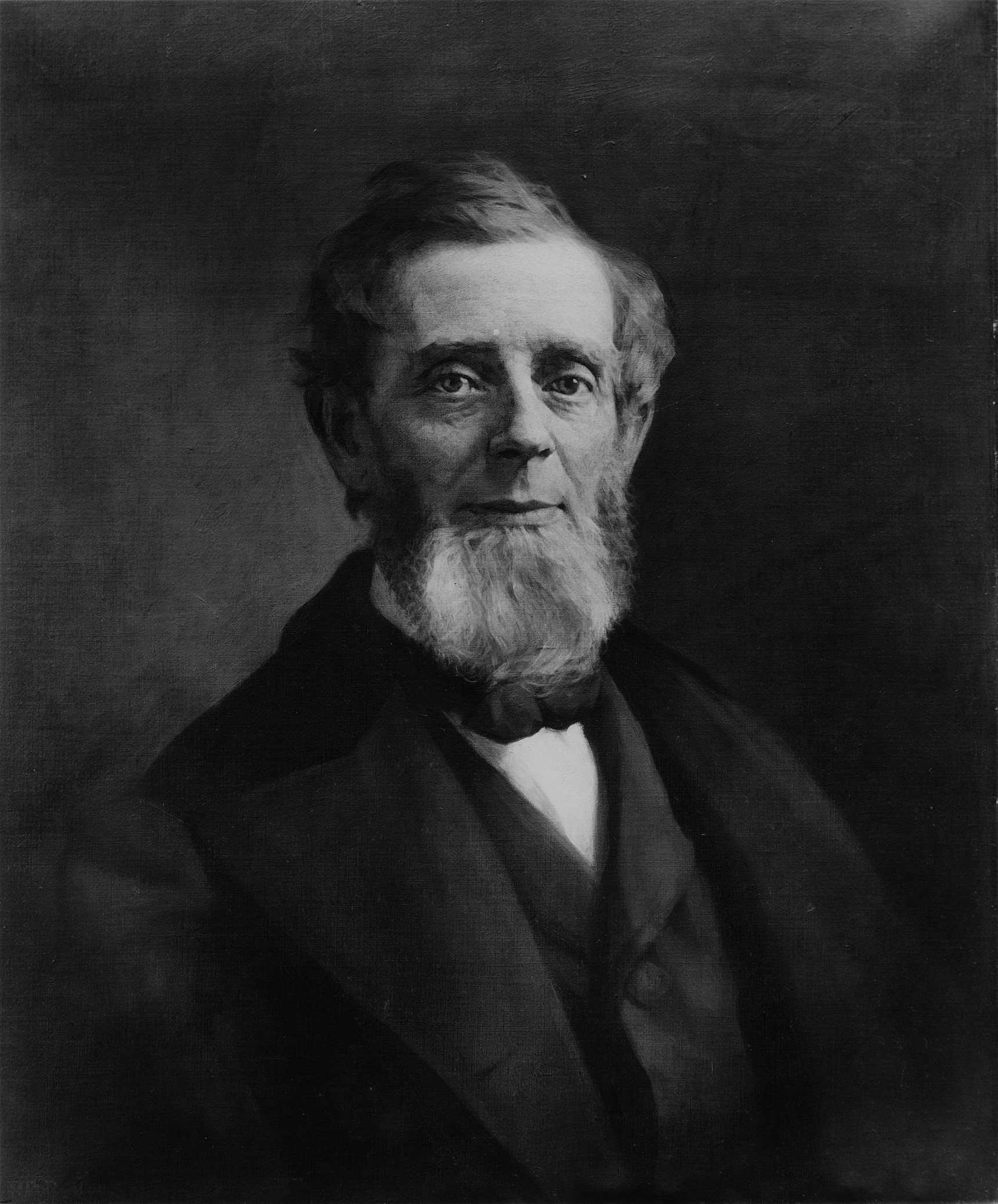
An 1872 portrait of Putnam

Putnam was born in Brunswick, Maine, on February 7, 1814.

== Career ==
Putnam moved to New York City, where he was given his first job by Jonathan Leavitt, who subsequently published Putnam's first book. In 1838, Putnam and John Wiley established the publishing house Wiley & Putnam in New York City. In 1841, Putnam went to London where he set up a branch office, the first American to ever do so. In 1848, he returned to New York City, where he dissolved the partnership with John Wiley and established G. Putnam Broadway, publishing a variety of works including quality illustrated books.

In 1852, with the assistance of George William Curtis and other partners, he founded Putnam's Magazine. It operated until 1856, resumed in 1868, and finally merged with Scribner's Monthly. His company was the official publisher to the New York World's Fair in 1852..

Putnam published the books of many classic American authors including his close friend Washington Irving, William Cullen Bryant, James Fenimore Cooper, and Edgar Allan Poe. He served as secretary for the Publishers' Association for many years and was an advocate of the creation of International Copyright Law. During the American Civil War, he participated in the Loyal Publication Society of New York, and suspended his business for three years (1863–1866) to become the United States government's Collector of Internal Revenue in New York City.

An important member of the New York artistic community, Putnam was the leading publisher of art books in his time and became one of the founders of the Metropolitan Museum of Art and served as its honorary superintendent in 1872. He was also chairman of the Committee on Art at the Vienna Universal Exposition. He is believed to have been the first publisher to offer book royalties to authors, including Elizabeth Barrett Browning and Thomas Carlyle.

== Personal life ==
Putnam married Victorine Haven; their marriage produced seven sons and four daughters. Their daughter, Mary Corinna Putnam (1842–1906), was a pioneering female doctor, the first woman admitted to the Faculté de Médecine de Paris. One of their sons, Herbert Putnam (1861–1955), became a noted librarian who served as the Librarian of Congress. Their youngest daughter Ruth Putnam (1856–1931) was an author.

== Death ==
Putnam died in New York City, on December 20, 1872, at age 58.

== Legacy ==
Following his death, his sons George and John inherited the business and the firm's name was changed to G. P. Putnam's Sons. George Putnam published his father's memoirs in 1912.

George Palmer Putnam's grandson and namesake, George P. Putnam (1887–1950), was part of the family business but was also an author and explorer whose first wife was Dorothy Binney, the daughter of Edwin Binney who founded Crayola; after their divorce, he married the famous aviator Amelia Earhart.

Putnam's granddaughter Brenda Putnam was a sculptor and author.

== Works ==
- Chronology, or an Introduction and Index to Universal History, Biography, and Useful Knowledge (1833)
- A Plea for International Copyright (1837)
- The Tourists in Europe (1838)
- American Book Circular with Notes and Statistics (1843)
- American Facts, Notes and Statistics Relative to the Government of the United States (1845)
- The World's Progress — a Dictionary of Dates (1850)
- Ten Years of the World's Progress, a supplement to his 1850 work (1861)
