= G. P. Putnam's Sons =

American book publisher

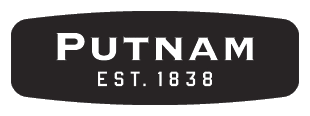
- Parent company: Penguin Group
- Founded: 1838; 188 years ago
- Founder: George Palmer Putnam; John Wiley
- Country of origin: United States
- Headquarters location: New York City, U.S.
- Publication types: Books
- Imprints: Amy Einhorn, Marian Wood, Coward-McCann
- Official website: penguin.com/putnam

G. P. Putnam's Sons is an American book publisher based in New York City, New York. The publisher was founded in 1838 and features books by authors such as Renée Ahdieh, C. J. Box, Edgar Allan Poe, and many others. Since 1996, it has been an imprint of the Penguin Group.

== History ==
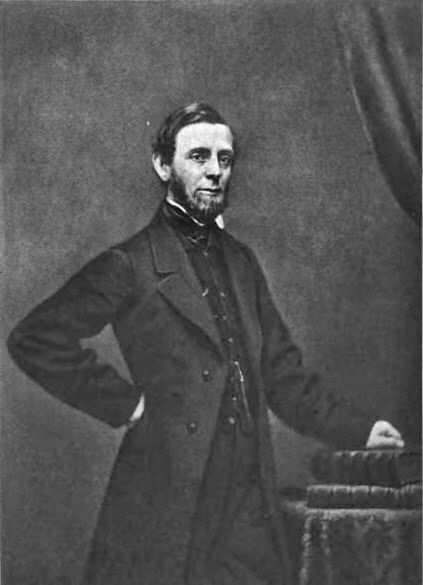
George Palmer Putnam (1814–1872) partnered with John Wiley in 1838 to form Wiley & Putnam.

The company began as Wiley & Putnam with the 1838 partnership between George Palmer Putnam and John Wiley, whose father had founded his own company in 1807.

In 1841, Putnam went to London where he set up a branch office in Covent Garden, the first American company ever to do so. He returned to New York in 1848, dissolved the partnership with John Wiley, and established G. Putnam Broadway with a view to publishing a variety of works, including quality illustrated books. Wiley began John Wiley (later John Wiley and Sons), which is still an independent publisher to the present day.

In 1853, G. P. Putnam & Co. started Putnam's Magazine with Charles Frederick Briggs as its editor.

On George Palmer Putnam's death in 1872, the business was inherited by his sons George, John and Irving, and the firm's name was changed to G. P. Putnam's Sons. The eldest son, George H. Putnam, became president of the firm and held the position for over fifty years.

In 1874, the company established its own book printing and manufacturing office, set up by John Putnam and operating initially out of newly leased premises at 182 Fifth Avenue. This printing side of the business later became a separate division called the Knickerbocker Press, and was relocated in 1889 to the Knickerbocker Press Building, built specifically for the press in New Rochelle, New York.

When George H. Putnam died in 1930, the various Putnam heirs voted to merge the firm with Minton, Balch & Co., who became the majority stockholders. George Palmer Putnam's grandson George P. Putnam (1887–1950) left the firm at that time, and Melville Minton, the partner and sales manager of Minton Balch & Co., became the acting president and majority stockholder of the firm until his death in 1956. In 1936, Putnam acquired the publisher Coward-McCann (later Coward, McCann & Geoghegan, after John Geoghegan its long-time chairman) and ran it as an imprint into the 1980s. Upon Melville Minton's death, his son Walter J. Minton took control of the company.

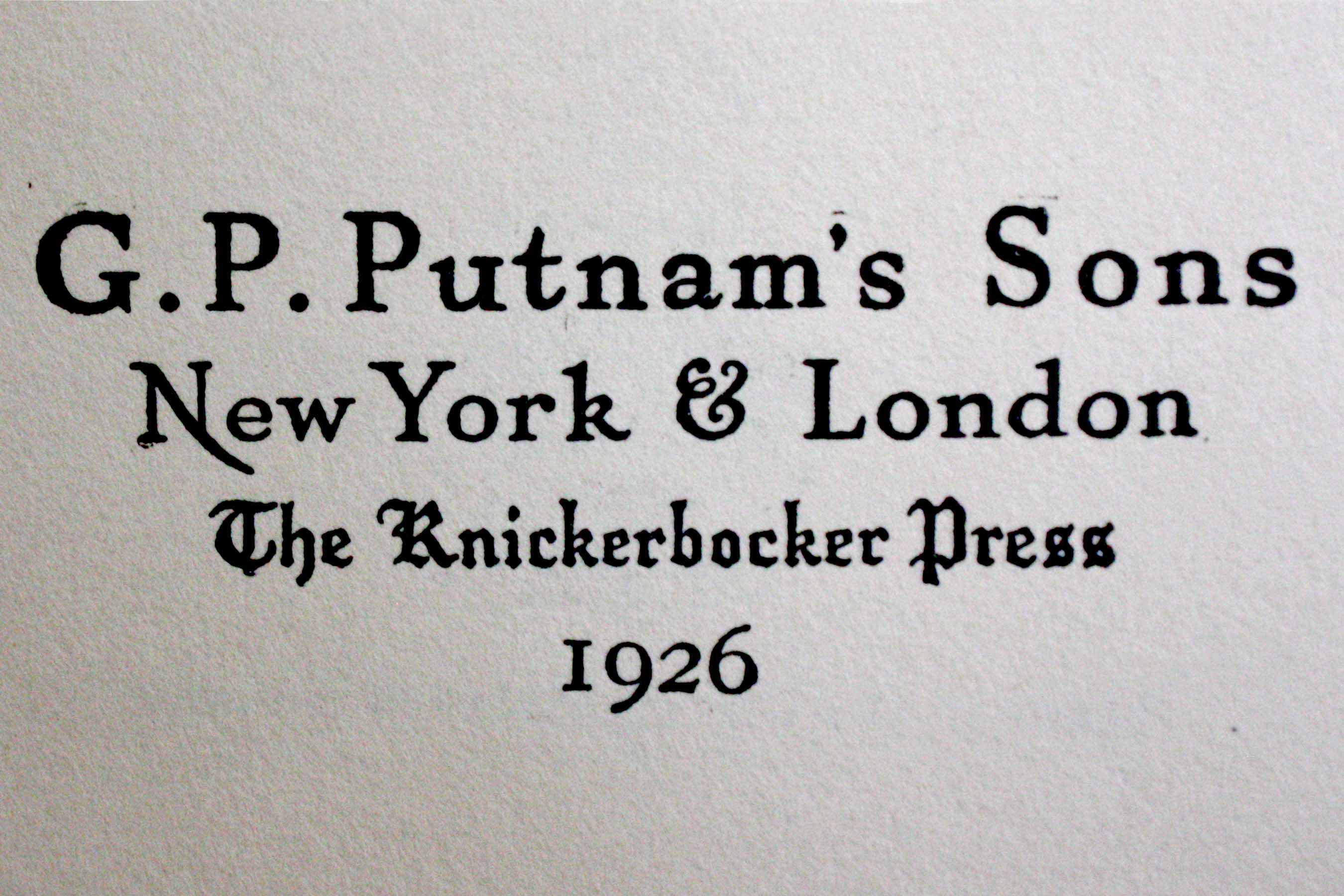
Publisher's imprint

In 1965, G. P. Putnam's Sons acquired Berkley Books, a mass market paperback publishing house.

MCA bought Putnam Publishing Group and Berkley Publishing Group in 1975. Phyllis E. Grann, who was running Pocket Books for Simon & Schuster, was brought on board in 1976 as editor-in-chief. In an attempt to boost Putnam's profits, Grann worked with MCA executive Stanley Newman on a financial model that emphasized publishing key authors annually and took Putnam from $10 million in revenue to over $100 million by 1983. While keeping the list at 75 titles a year, Putnam focused on winners like Tom Clancy whose book Red Storm Rising sold almost one million copies in 1986. Along with other publishers in the 1980s, Putnam moved to a heavy discount hardcover model to keep up with demand and sales through bookstore chains and price clubs. Grann was promoted to CEO of Putnam in 1987, notably the first woman to become CEO of a major publishing house. By 1993, the publisher was making $200 million in revenue.

In 1982, Putnam acquired the respected children's book publisher, Grosset & Dunlap from Filmways. The same year, Putnam acquired the book publishing division of Playboy Enterprises, which included Seaview Books.

The ownership of Putnam changed a number of times in the 1990s. MCA was bought by Matsushita Electric in 1990. Then the Seagram Company acquired 80% of MCA from Matsushita, and shortly afterwards Seagram changed the name of the company to Universal Studios, Inc. The new owners had no interest in publishing, but Grann stepped in and was able to broker the deal for Putnam to be merged with Penguin Group (a division of British publishing conglomerate Pearson PLC) in 1996. Putnam and the Penguin Group formed Penguin Putnam Inc. Grann abruptly left the company in 2001, after speculation over tensions with Pearson's CEO Marjorie Scardino.

In 2013, Penguin merged with Bertelsmann's Random House, forming Penguin Random House.

== Authors ==
- Ace Atkins
- A. Scott Berg
- C. J. Box
- Eleanor Brown
- Tom Clancy
- Robin Cook
- James Fenimore Cooper
- Patricia Cornwell
- Clive Cussler
- Frederick Forsyth
- Sue Grafton
- Robert A. Heinlein
- Frank Herbert
- Jack Higgins
- Washington Irving
- David Joy
- Charles Lindbergh
- Herman Melville
- Vladimir Nabokov
- Delia Owens
- Frederick Law Olmsted
- Robert B. Parker
- Francis Parkman
- Neil Pasricha
- Edgar Allan Poe
- Mario Puzo
- Theodore Roosevelt
- Christine Sadler
- John Sandford
- Renée Ahdieh

== Former book series ==
- Arabesque Series
- Ariel Booklets
- Capricorn Giants
- English Life Series
- Everyday Life Series
- Golden Hind Series
- Here is Your Hobby
- Heroes of the Nations
- Lives to Remember
- New Perspectives on Black America
- Putnam Documentary History Series

== Former imprints ==
- Capricorn Books, G.P. Putnam's Sons

== See also ==
- Books in the United States
