= John Bishop Putnam =

American publisher (1849–1915)

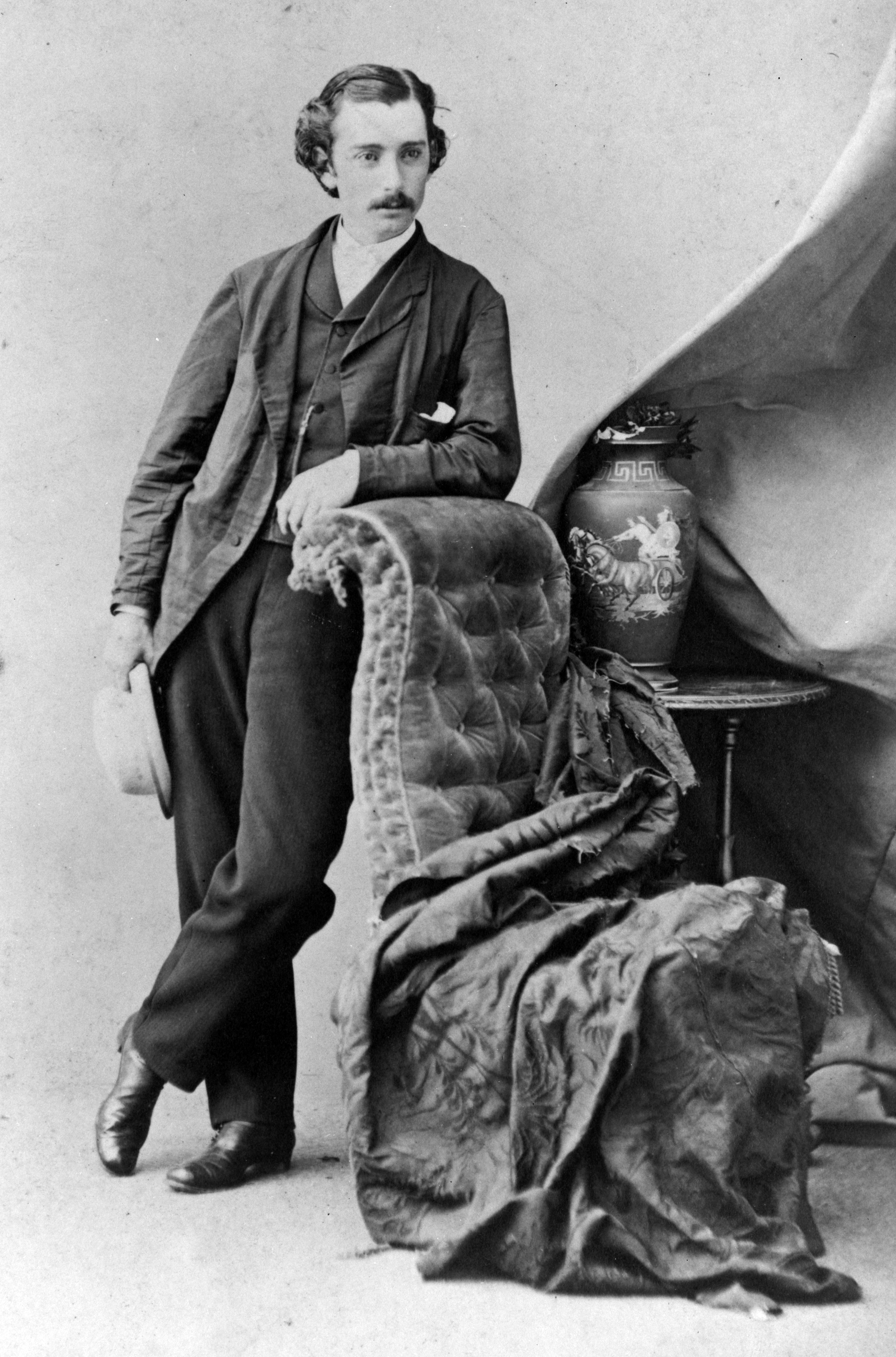
John Bishop Putnam

John Bishop Putnam (July 17, 1849 – October 7, 1915) was treasurer and a director of the book publishing firm founded by his father, G.P. Putnam & Sons. He was the father of George P. Putnam, who married Amelia Earhart.

== Biography ==
He was born in Staten Island, New York on July 17, 1849 to George Palmer and Mrs. Victorine Haven Putnam, a year after his father founded the firm. He was educated at Clark and Fanning's Collegiate Institute and the Pennsylvania Agricultural College. Before entering the family business in 1868, he traveled extensively in Europe and Japan. In 1874, he established a book printing and manufacturing office, operating initially out of newly leased premises at 182 Fifth Avenue. Originally, a part of G.P. Putnam & Sons, it later became a separate division called the Knickerbocker Press. In 1889 it relocated to a new building in New Rochelle, New York, the Knickerbocker Press Building.

Putnam married Francis Faulkner (b. 1857, d. 1936) on April 18, 1882. They had three sons, Robert Faulkner Putnam (d. 1918), Victor Haven Putnam (d. 1925) and George P. Putnam (d. 1950). Their son George Palmer, a publisher and explorer, was married to Amelia Earhart; the famous aviator. John Bishop Putnam was an avid photographer and the author of several books, including "A Norwegian Ramble Among the Fjords, Mountains and Glaciers" and "Authors and Publishers", the latter, co-authored with his brother, and fellow publisher, George Haven Putnam. A resident of Rye, New York, he died of heart failure on October 7, 1915. Mr. Putnam was a member of The New York Typothetae, The General Society of Mechanics and Tradesmen of the City of New York, and of the Union League and American Yacht Clubs.

== Works ==
- A Norwegian Ramble Among the Fjords, Mountains and Glaciers (G. P. Putnam's Sons, 1904)
