= Appleton (surname) =

Appleton is an Anglo-Saxon locational surname.

It is borne by:

== People ==
- Alistair Appleton (born 1970), British television presenter
- Charles Appleton (academic) (1841–1879), Oxford don and scholarly entrepreneur
- Charles Appleton (cricketer) (1844–1925), English amateur cricketer
- Charles William Appleton (1874–1945), vice president of the General Electric Company, judge and Assistant District Attorney in New York City
- Chris Appleton (born 1983), English hairstylist
- Colin Appleton (1936–2021), English football player and manager
- Daniel Appleton (1785–1849), American publisher, founder of D. Appleton & Company
- Edward Victor Appleton (1892–1965), English Nobel Prize-winning physicist known for his research on the ionosphere
- Edwin Nelson Appleton (1877–1937), United States Marine and Medal of Honor recipient
- Elizabeth Lachlan (1790–1849), née Appleton, British writer and education advocate
- Francis R. Appleton (1854–1929), American lawyer and member of the 400 during the Gilded Age
- Frederick Charles Appleton (1835–1914), Australian actor
- George Swett Appleton (1821–1878), American publisher
- Henry Appleton (anarchist)
- Henry Appleton (captain) (fl. 1650–1654), English captain in the navy and commodore
- James Appleton (1786–1862), American abolitionist
- Jean Appleton (1911–2003), Australian painter, art teacher and printmaker
- John Appleton (disambiguation)
- Jon Appleton (1939–2022), American composer, author and professor of music
- Mason Appleton (born 1996), American ice hockey player
- Michael Appleton (born 1975), English football manager and former player
- Mike Appleton (1936–2020), British television producer
- Natalie Appleton (born 1973), Canadian-born British singer
- Nathan Appleton (1779–1861), American merchant, entrepreneur and politician
- Nicole Appleton (born 1974), Canadian-born British singer, sister of Natalie Appleton
- Ray Appleton (1941–2015), American jazz drummer
- Ronald Appleton (1927–2025), Crown Prosecutor for Northern Ireland
- Ruel Ross Appleton (1853–1928), campaign manager for Mayor Gaynor of New York City
- Samuel Appleton (merchant) (1766–1853), American merchant and philanthropist
- Scott Appleton (1942–1992), American football player
- Stevie Appleton (born 1989), British singer
- Talia Appleton (born 2005), Australian cyclist
- Thomas Gold Appleton (1812–1884), American author and artist
- William Appleton (politician) (1786–1862), congressman from Massachusetts
- Will Appleton (1889–1958), mayor of Wellington, New Zealand
- William Sumner Appleton (1874–1947), founder Society for the Preservation of New England Antiquities
- William M. Appleton (1920–2001), Pennsylvania politician
- William Henry Appleton (1814–1899), American publisher
- William Appleton (entrepreneur) (born 1961), American entrepreneur and technologist
- William H. Appleton (1843–1912), American soldier and Medal of Honor recipient
- William Thomas Appleton (1859–1930), Australian businessman, shipping agent and public servant

== Fictional characters ==
- the title character of Elizabeth Appleton, a 1963 novel by John O'Hara
- Larry Appleton, from the TV series Perfect Strangers

== See also ==
- Appleton family, American political, religious and mercantile family
