= Charles Appleton =

Charles Appleton may refer to:

- Charles Appleton (academic) (1841–1879), Oxford don and scholarly entrepreneur
- Charles Appleton (cricketer) (1844–1925), English amateur cricketer
- Charles William Appleton (1874–1945), vice president of the General Electric Company, judge and Assistant District Attorney in New York City
