= Netley Cottage =

Coordinates: 51°33′35″N 0°10′49″W

Netley Cottage at 10 Lower Terrace is a house in Hampstead in the London Borough of Camden. It is listed Grade II on the National Heritage List for England.

The house dates to c.1779; an extension was added to the south west in 1910. It was most likely developed from a farmhouse. The cottage is rendered in stucco and is 2 storeys in height.

Several notable people have been associated with Netley Cottage. Adolphus Ward was born at the cottage in December 1837. The future Lord Chief Justice of England and Wales, John Coleridge, lived here as a young barrister.

Charles Appleton lived here for several years. His biographer Archibald Henry Sayce described Netley Cottage as "the pretty artistic home where it was his pride and pleasure to bring together gradually the goodly collection of books, engravings, china, old furniture...". Robert Louis Stevenson and Sidney Colvin frequented the house when Appleton was resident.

The solicitor Percy Edward Marshall, founder of the law firm Hensman & Marshall and Director of the Law Association, lived here for several decades.
