= Parlour boarder =

Privileged class of boarding school students

A parlour boarder is an archaic term for a privileged category of pupil at a boarding school. Parlour boarders are described by a modern historian as paying more than the other pupils, in return for which they got a room of their own. A parlour was a small reception room, from the French "parler", implying a place for quiet conversation; "board" means meals, as in the expression room and board. The term is mostly historic in British English.

In 18th and 19th century England, there were a profusion of small schools, always single-sex, with the number of pupils ranging from fewer than a dozen to a few score, on a much more domestic scale than the so-called public schools such as Eton and Harrow. Many of these small schools were operated on a family basis, often by a married couple (for boys), or by sisters or female friends (for girls). They would accept day pupils, common boarders, and parlour boarders.

== 18–19th centuries ==
Elizabeth Lachlan was at school in London when its owner, a Miss Shepherd, impulsively decided to move her school from Percy Street to France during the Peace of Amiens in 1802. She set out on this venture with "thirty to forty girls of respectable families, and ten or twelve ladies as parlour boarders".

Thomas Reynolds (1771–1836), the Irish informer, son of a wealthy textile manufacturer, was sent at eight years old as a parlour boarder to the school of Rev. Archibald Crawford at Chiswick, then a village on the outskirts of London.

The school was composed of eight parlour-boarders, and about sixty other lads. The parlour-boarders lived entirely at the Doctor's table, and joined in all his society as part of his family. In their walks they were usually accompanied by the Doctor himself, who rarely entrusted that responsibility to an usher.

== 20th century ==
The Indian diplomat Venkata Siddharthacharry was largely educated in England, and entitled a chapter of his memoir "Parlour Boarder". He defines it as a situation that allows access "to both the family dining room and the family drawing room", "a great privilege naturally, paid for sumptuously". One much-valued benefit was the fire, which was lit from mid-autumn "right up to the end of spring", in contrast to the frigid dormitories.

The Jesuit school named after Francis de Sales in Nagpur, India, even in the mid 20th century:

ran a three tier system of boarding. Parlour boarders, ordinary boarders, and charity boarders. The Parlour boarders were treated like residents of a five star hotel, Ordinary like two star residents, and Charity like poor relations, only a little better off than the orphan children described in the novels of Charles Dickens.

One Anglo-Indian family sent the light-skinned son as a parlour boarder, while his darker brothers were merely ordinary boarders. (See Discrimination based on skin color or "colorism".)

== Fictional examples ==
- Harriet Smith in Emma by Jane Austen.
- Sara Crewe in A Little Princess by Frances Hodgson Burnett.
- James Steerforth in David Copperfield by Charles Dickens.
