= Kate Hayllar =

British painter (1864–1959)

Beatrice Kate Hayllar (1 September 1864, in London – 1959) was a British painter and nurse, best remembered for her detailed floral and still life paintings. During her lifetime, her works were exhibited at the Royal Academy of Arts, the Royal Society of British Artists, the Royal Institute of Painters in Water Colours and the Arthur Tooth & Sons Gallery. Posthumously, her work has been auctioned at Christie's.

== Life and career ==
Hayllar was born in Mecklenburgh Square, but spent most of her childhood at the family house, Castle Priory, in Wallingford on the River Thames in Berkshire (now Oxfordshire), where she and her sisters received training in art from their father.

The house and its surroundings provided inspiration for the majority of Hayllar's paintings, as well as those of her sisters. She was the youngest daughter of James Hayllar, a prominent Victorian artist, and Ellen Hayllar. She had four sisters and four brothers, among whom Jessica Hayllar, Edith Hayllar and Mary Hayllar also became accomplished artists.

When her mother died in 1900, Hayllar stopped painting and devoted herself to nursing. She moved to Bournemouth with her father and sister Jessica, and later, her sister Mary. She never married and devoted herself to caring for her family and friends. Before her early retirement as a professional artist, Hayllar had twelve works displayed at the Royal Academy of Arts (RA) from 1885 to 1898, the first of these, The Old Brocaded Gown, was bought by the Princess of Wales, later Queen Alexandra, wife of King Edward VII, and six were displayed at the Royal Society of British Artists from 1883 to 1889. She also exhibited at the Royal Institute of Painters in Water Colours and the Arthur Tooth & Sons Gallery.

Queen Alexandra also bought a drawing, Tommy's Orange, which Hayllar had exhibited with the Royal Society of British Artists in 1883.

Unlike her older sisters Jessica, Edith, and Mary, who mostly painted interior scenes of Castle Priory, Hayllar focused on still lifes, often incorporating floral elements and exotic souvenirs from foreign lands. Her surviving works include Still life with a Canton famille rose teapot and camellias and A Thing of Beauty is a Joy Forever. The latter work was well received when it was exhibited at the RA in 1890, as indicated by a report in the local press:

One of the best talked about pictures in the present exhibition is Miss Kate Hayllar’s ‘‘A Thing of Beauty is a Joy Forever’’ (1,190). As a tour de force it is remarkable; the painting of the furniture, china, flowers, prints on the wall, is achieved with consummate delicacy; it is so harmonious in colour, and so remarkable a piece of workmanship that one is tempted to think it owes its existence to some clever process rather than to manipulative skill. Artifice can scarcely go further than this.

It was sold by Christie's in 2003 from the Forbes Collection of Victorian Pictures and Works of Art for £50,190 (equivalent to £100,200 in 2023).

Hayllar died in 1959 at the age of 95.
