= Room and board =

Combined provision of accommodation and meals

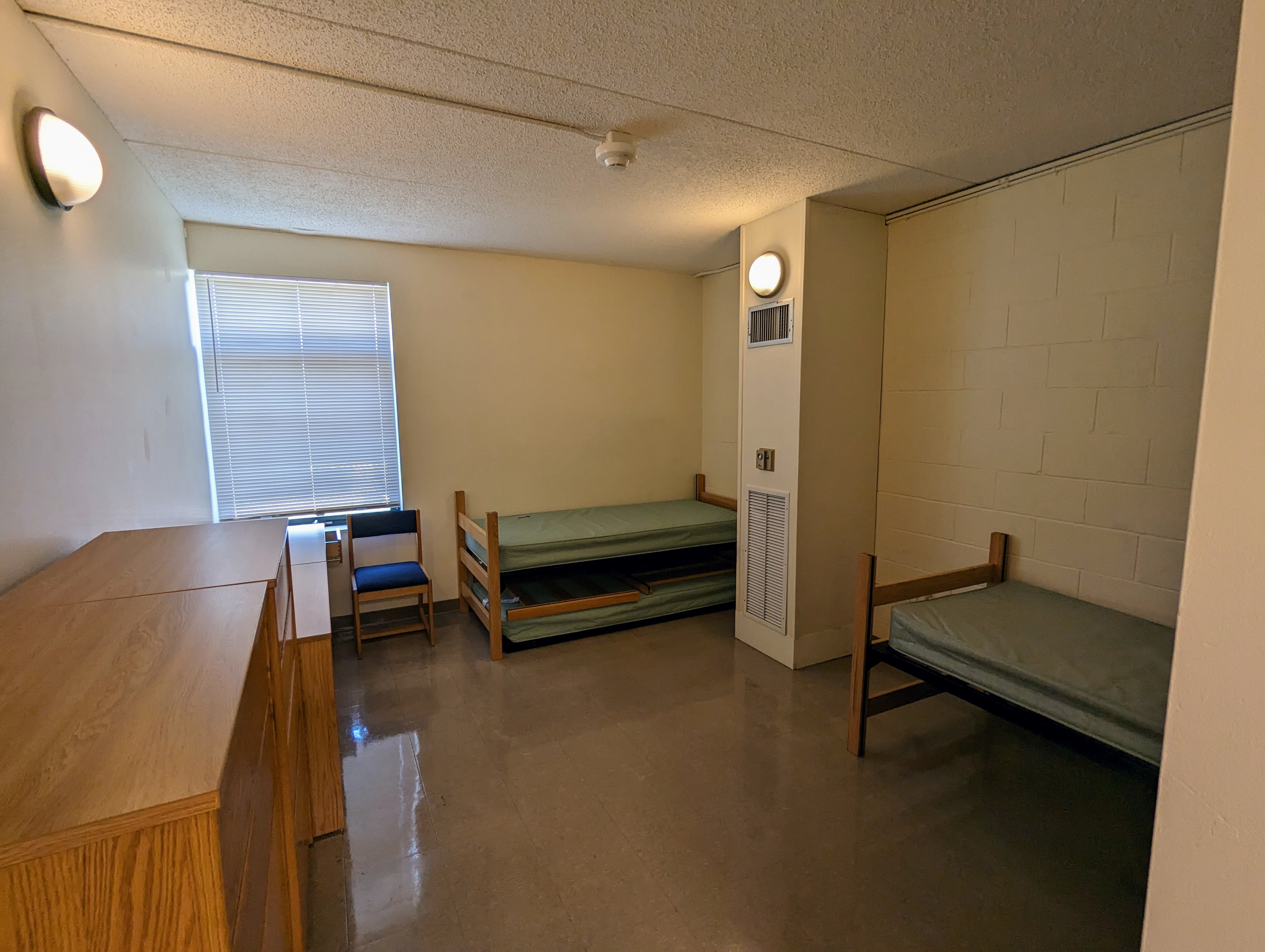
A dorm room at Endicott College in Beverly, Massachusetts, United States.

Room and board describes an accommodation which, in exchange for money, labour or other compensation, a person is provided with a place to live in addition to meals. It is most common at higher educational institutions, such as colleges and universities; it may also be seen in hotel-style accommodation for short stays, or on remote research or industrial facilities, including Antarctica research stations or oil rigs.

== Definition ==
The two words in Room and board refer to the two main elements that are provided as part of a given exchange:

- Room, or the space in which one rests or studies; these often contain a bed, desk, and dresser, but may also include an attached bathroom, shower, or closet space
- Board, or the providing of food, equipment, and leisure; the use of this term may derive from the Old English bord, meaning table.

Room and board is commonly provided in one of three formats; those are

- Full board, where the host provides three daily meals.
- Half board, where the host provides only two meals, typically breakfast and dinner, but less commonly breakfast and lunch.
- Bed and breakfast, where the host only provides sleeping space and breakfast.

== See also ==
- Bistro, a type of informal French restaurant
- Boarding house, a lodging establishment
- Boarding school
- Parlour boarder, an archaic term for a category of pupil at boarding school
- Sideboard, an article of furniture from which food is served in a dining room
