= Appleton Township =

Appleton Township may refer to the following townships:

- Appleton Township, Clark County, Kansas
- Appleton Township, Swift County, Minnesota
- Appleton Township, St. Clair County, Missouri

== See also ==
- Appleton (disambiguation)
