= Jessica Hayllar =

British artist and painter

- Born: Jessica Ellen Hayllar; 16 September 1858; London
- Died: 7 November 1940 (aged 82); Hill House, Perry Hill, Worplesdon Surrey
- Known for: Painting
- Notable work: A Coming Event (1886); Finishing Touches (1887); Fresh From the Altar (1890); Autumn Sunlight (1891); All Better Now (1896); A Sunny Corner (1909)

Jessica Ellen Hayllar (16 September 1858 – 7 November 1940) was a British artist and painter.

Hayllar was born in London and was the eldest daughter of the nine children born to Ellen Phoebe Cavell (1827–1899) and her husband James Hayllar (1829–1920). The family lived at Mecklenburgh Square in London and also rented a country house in Suffolk for several months each year before moving to a large house, Castle Priory, by the Thames at Wallingford, then in Berkshire. Hayllar and her four sisters attended a day school in Gower Street and all were given art lessons by their father, who was himself a well-regarded painter. Jessica Hayllar became the most prolific artist among the Hayllar offspring, although her sister Edith also achieved some recognition. Jessica Hayllar exhibited at the Royal Academy in London regularly between 1879 and 1915 and also had works shown at the Society of British Artists, with the Institute of Painters in Oil Colours and at the Royal Manchester Institution. She often painted domestic scenes, local villagers and depicted family occasions and gatherings. Windows and doorways were another frequent theme in her work. Ill health as a result of being knocked down by a carriage in 1900 greatly reduced her output in her later years when she was living in Bournemouth with her father. In her final years she mostly concentrated on painting flower pieces.

== Biography ==
Jessica Hayllar was born in 1858 into the middle-class family of James Hayllar and Ellen Cavell Hayllar. She was the third child and the oldest daughter. Hayllar spent the majority of her childhood in the countryside of Wallingford at the family home, Castle Priory, where she and her siblings learned to paint from her father. James Hayllar provided his daughters with artistic training and their own separate studio, as well as all the materials they needed and established working hours. Their artistic training began with drawing, learning perspective, modelling in clay, etching, and engraving before progressing to painting. The Hayllar sisters thus followed the traditional model of female artists learning from family members, even though public art classes were becoming more available for women at the time.

Hayllar lived with her parents throughout her life and never married. According to Christopher Wood, Hayllar's best works were painted from 1885 to 1900 and primarily consist of domestic scenes at Castle Priory. In 1899, Jessica moved with her parents from Castle Priory to a smaller home in Bournemouth, where she continued to live with her father after her mother's death. Hayllar became partially paralyzed in a carriage accident in 1900. She would spend the rest of her life in a wheelchair, but she continued her artistic work. After the accident, Hayllar's work tended to focus more on flowers, particularly azaleas. Following her father's death in 1920, Jessica moved to Surrey to live with her sister Edith Hayllar MacKay. Jessica Hayllar died in 1940.

== Survey of career ==
While many Victorian women artists had the opportunity to attend formal training outside the home, the Hayllar sisters were all educated by their father. James Hayllar taught his children to depict popular subjects that would sell, and Jessica's work, along with her sisters’, made a significant economic contribution to the family's income. This was somewhat unusual for women artists in the upper middle classes, since many did not want to undermine their reputations as “gentlewomen.” However, Hayllar was a professional artist, preparing artworks for exhibitions, promoting her work, and participating in interviews for newspapers and journals.

Hayllar's work was well received in her time, both in her local district and in the larger Victorian art community. The Royal Academy first exhibited one of her works in 1879. Following that and for the rest of Hayllar's lifetime, every year except 1882, at least one of Hayllar's paintings was exhibited at the Royal Academy. These were often hung “on the line,” an honor that meant her paintings were exhibited at the eye level of the viewers. Hayllar also exhibited at the Royal Society of Arts, the Manchester City Art Galleries, the Royal Institute of Painters in Water Colours, the Dudley Gallery, and the Walker Art Gallery.

== Major works ==
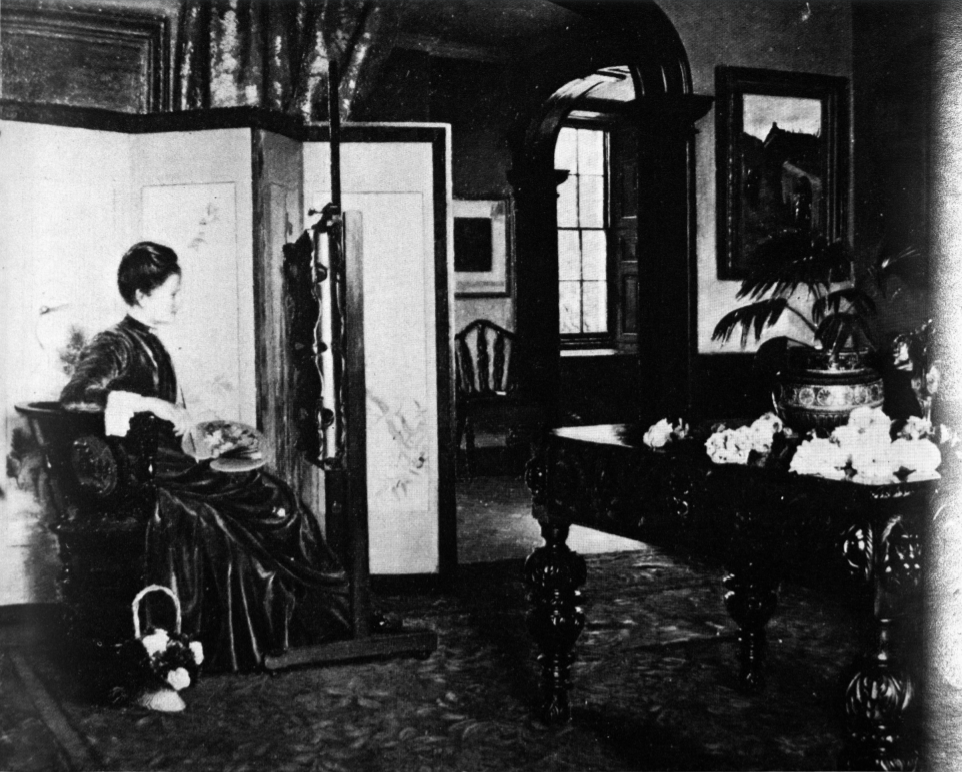
Jessica Hayllar, Finishing Touches, 1887, oil on canvas, present location unknown, photograph from photo albums of the Hayllar sisters' work.

One of Jessica Hayllar's major works is Autumn Sunlight (1891). This painting plays with Hayllar's common motif of a series of open doorways and a strange sense of space. Displayed at the 1891 Royal Academy of Art Summer Exhibition, the painting depicts a woman producing art. The woman focuses on her artistic work over the child in the picture. Overall, this work demonstrates the possibility for a woman to be both a good artist and a good mother, still in control of her household.

Another well-known work of Hayllar's is A Coming Event, which was created in 1886 and is part of a series that includes Fresh from the Front of 1887, The Return from Confirmation in 1888, and Fresh from the Altar of 1890. This work belongs to the Forbes Collection of Victorian Painters and Works of Art. The painting uses space and thresholds to demonstrate the transformative moment of a woman's transition into married life. The main figure—the bride—sits in a long passage. A different figure in the background represents her past life and family, while the foreground includes symbols of her wedding to come. The series at a whole represents a collection of transitions of femininity, Christian ritual, and middle-class social rituals.

Hayllar's 1887 work Finishing Touches shows a female artist painting. In this work, Jessica Hayllar depicts her sister Edith, also an artist. The painting closely frames her in an elaborate home setting. By making a female artist worthy of depiction, Hayllar elevates women's painting from a hobby to a profession. Edith as a female artist claims the space, even as openings keep the space from being closed or confining. This work indicates the high value Hayllar placed on her work and that of her sisters; it also indicates how space could be framed by women artists to create ownership.

== Styles and influences ==
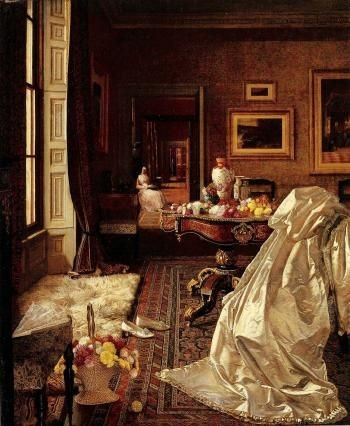
Jessica Hayllar, A Coming Event, 1886, oil on canvas, previously in the Forbes Collection, Private Collection.

Jessica Hayllar's work was obviously strongly influenced by that of her father, James Hayllar, who was her primary artistic instructor. Based on James’ instruction, his daughters’ artworks were meant to be meticulously realistic. Compared to her father's work, Jessica Hayllar's work is less academic. It tends to be smaller scale and less elaborate, with fewer figures. It is also less idyllic and sentimental. The influence of James Hayllar is, however, felt in Jessica Hayllar's meticulous details and near-photographic realism. It is seen also in Hayllar's subject matters, which focus on upper middle-class life and the social spaces of middle class femininity. Hayllar himself often painted portraits, genre scenes, and still life pieces. Jessica's work is often tied to that of her sisters, Mary, Edith, and Kate. In the Castle Priory years of Hayllar's work, they undoubtedly were large influences on each other. However, Jessica is the only sister who painted throughout her entire life. In contrast, Mary and Edith stopped painting after their marriages, and Kate became a nurse.

Jessica Hayllar may have been influenced early on by her neighbor, artist George Dunlop Leslie, who moved next door to the Hayllars in 1883. Just as she often modelled for her father, Hayllar may have been a model for Leslie as well. Leslie had a clear stylistic influence on Jessica's sister Mary, but his own tendency to paint domestic scenes may have influenced Jessica Hayllar as well.

Hayllar's work may have also been influenced by photography, since the Hayllar family used photographs to keep records of their works. Hayllar may have even used photography as an aid for her work. Her compositions appear to reflect the influence of photography with their detailed focus, flattened picture space, precise design, and cut-off compositions.

Much of Hayllar's art centers around daily life, including many scenes of the Hayllar family home in Wallingford. Her artwork has been called “a fascinating insight into the life of a typical middle-class Victorian household.” Hayllar focused on still lifes, flowers, and images of middle-class women and children at home. Hayllar painted a large number of domestic scenes, using her family members as models, a method that was meant to indicate morality and piety. These works often reveal the elaborate social rituals that characterized Victorian bourgeois life. Most of Jessica Hayllar's work presents an idealized view of female domesticity; this may have been her opinions as a Victorian-era woman, or it may have been a simple decision to paint what would sell best. Notably, two of Hayllar's works, Finishing Touches (1887) and Autumn Sunlight (1891), depict women producing art in the home. This practice of female artists painting each other was a way to elevate their profession beyond a simple hobby. Women in Hayllar's art interact with each other through the domestic space, but their preoccupation in domestic work deflects male voyeurism.

Much of Hayllar's work is about domestic space, and domestic settings are often emphasized more than figures or events. This is perhaps best evident in Fresh from the Altar, which focuses on the overall space of the home rather than the figure of the bride. Hayllar's art frequently shows flowers, furniture, and other aspects of decorative design. Hayllar often repeated the same motif of a series of open doorways. This was visually interesting because it created depth, so it was easily marketable. Another major theme in Hayllar's art is children interacting with adults, particularly mother figures. She often shows mothers educating their children. Servants are sometimes included in Hayllar's art as symbols of household order and gatekeepers to middle class domestic ritual. Hayllar also displays an interest in exotic imported objects, reflecting the influence of Japonisme and possibly also cultural imperialism. In her work, she often included one certain Japanese folding screen depicting small birds and cranes. Hayllar used this screen as a device to create intimate spaces, conceal aspects of the composition, act as a background, or emphasize the subject matter. The birds on the screen may be symbolic of a long, happy life, a message conducive to the warm home atmospheres that Hayllar created.

As a Victorian woman, Hayllar worked in the intersection between increasing education and employment for women and the concept of “separate spheres,” in which women were meant to be domestic and men were meant to be public. The “Cult of True Womanhood” idealized women as moral and spiritual models for men. This meant they were in charge of educating their children and supporting their children. This gave them a domestic voice, but it generally restricted their ability to work in more public spheres.

== Survey of criticism ==
Christopher Wood has provided much of the published research about the Hayllar family. He saw the sisters primarily as “talented amateurs” and viewed their value primarily as providing a documentary-style record of Victorian middle-class country life.

Deborah Cherry discusses Hayllar's art as playing into themes of patriarchy as well as imperialism. She draws this conclusion based on the prevalence of domestic scenes in Hayllar's work, which appears to depict happy domesticity. Cherry sees Hayllar's work as representing a closed, contained world that signifies Victorian customs as ideal social order. For Cherry, this kind of work is a form of containing the social crisis of the time—women's increased opportunities, redefining of gender roles, the rise of socialism, and the struggle between colonies and colonizers.

Mary Gabrielle Hayllar's doctoral dissertation acts as a biography of the lives of the Hayllar sisters. In it, the author argues against Cherry's patriarchal assertions. Mary Gabrielle Hayllar sees the Hayllar's artistic decisions as primarily based on the desire to make money, rather than the desire to espouse Victorian ideals. Mary Hayllar argues that the sisters were more than amateurs, and she discusses the market appeal of their works. She frames this as adding a strong aspect of modernity to the Hayllar sisters’ works.

== Contribution to field ==
Domestic-focused art like Jessica Hayllar's shaped and disseminated middle-class Victorian ideals. While Hayllar's impact has not been strongly addressed in scholarship, her contribution is still significant because it indicates the possibility for Victorian women artists to be successful in both shows and income. Hayllar's manipulation of space can be understood in a greater context of women artists using space to define their roles in society. Her work can be used to see into middle-class Victorian life and to view how women in mainstream Victorian society defined themselves.

== Additional works ==
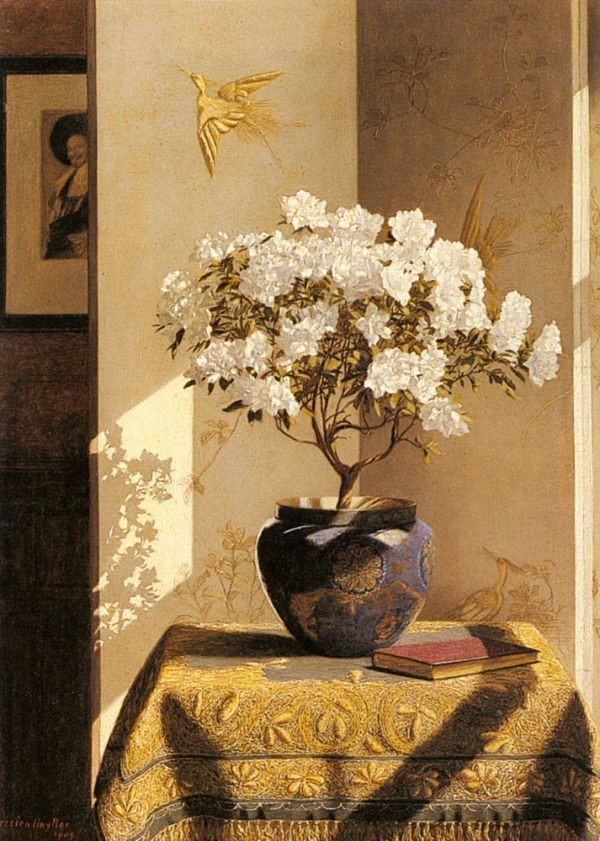
Jessica Hayllar, A Sunny Corner, 1909, oil on board, Private Collection.

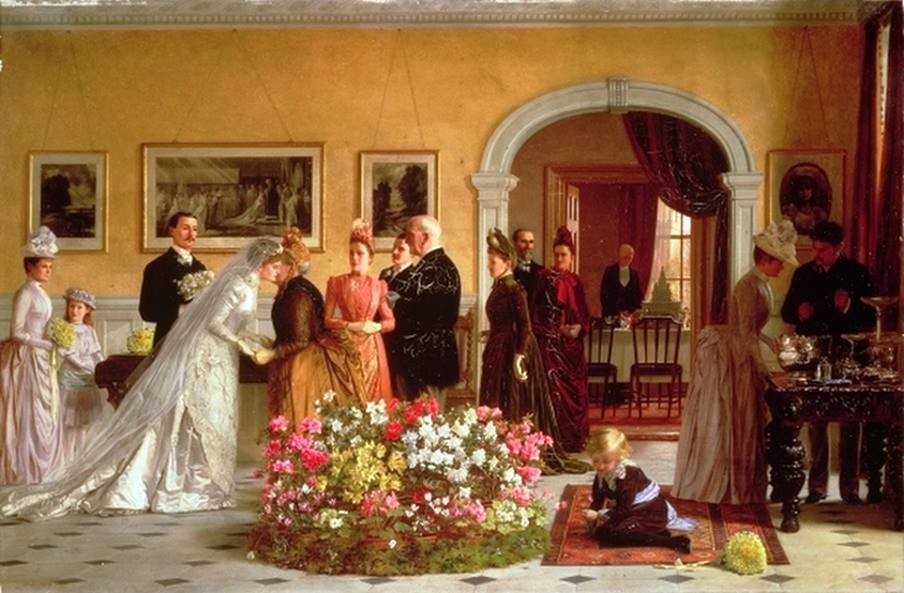
Jessica Hayllar, Fresh from the Altar, 1890, oil on canvas, Private Collection.

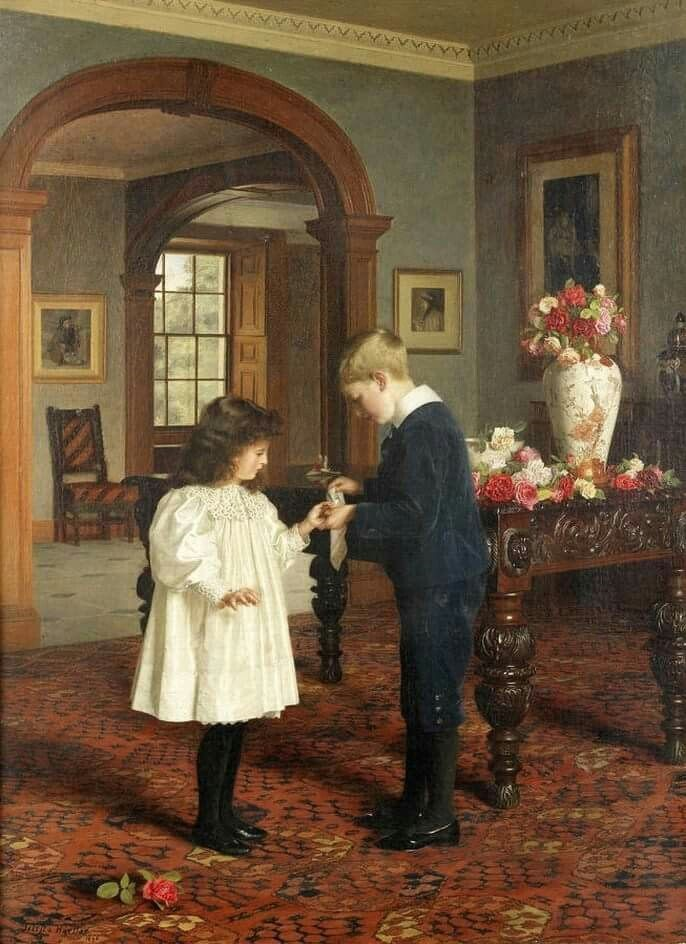
Jessica Hayllar, All Better Now, 1896, oil on canvas, Private Collection.

== Additional Sources ==
- Christopher Wood, Victorian Painters (Woodbridge, Suffolk: Antique Collectors’ Club, 1995).
- Whitney Chadwick, Women, Art, and Society (London: Thames & Hudson, 2012).
