= John Appleton (disambiguation) =

John Appleton (1815–1864) was an American Assistant Secretary of State and Democratic Party politician from Maine.

John Appleton is also the name of:

- John Appleton (academic), Master of University College, Oxford, England (c. 1401–8)
- John E. C. Appleton (1905–1990), Australian theatre and radio producer
- John F. Appleton (1838–1870), American Civil War general from Maine
- John James Appleton (1792–1864), diplomat for the United States
- John Appleton (judge) (1804–1891), Justice of the Maine Supreme Judicial Court
- John Howard Appleton (1844–1930), American chemist

== See also ==
- Jon Appleton (1939–2022), American composer, author and professor of music
- Appleton (disambiguation)
