= Edith Hayllar =

British artist

- Self portrait
- Born: 1860
- Died: 1948 (aged 87–88)
- Known for: Painting
- Movement: Neoclassicism
- Spouse: Bruce MacKay

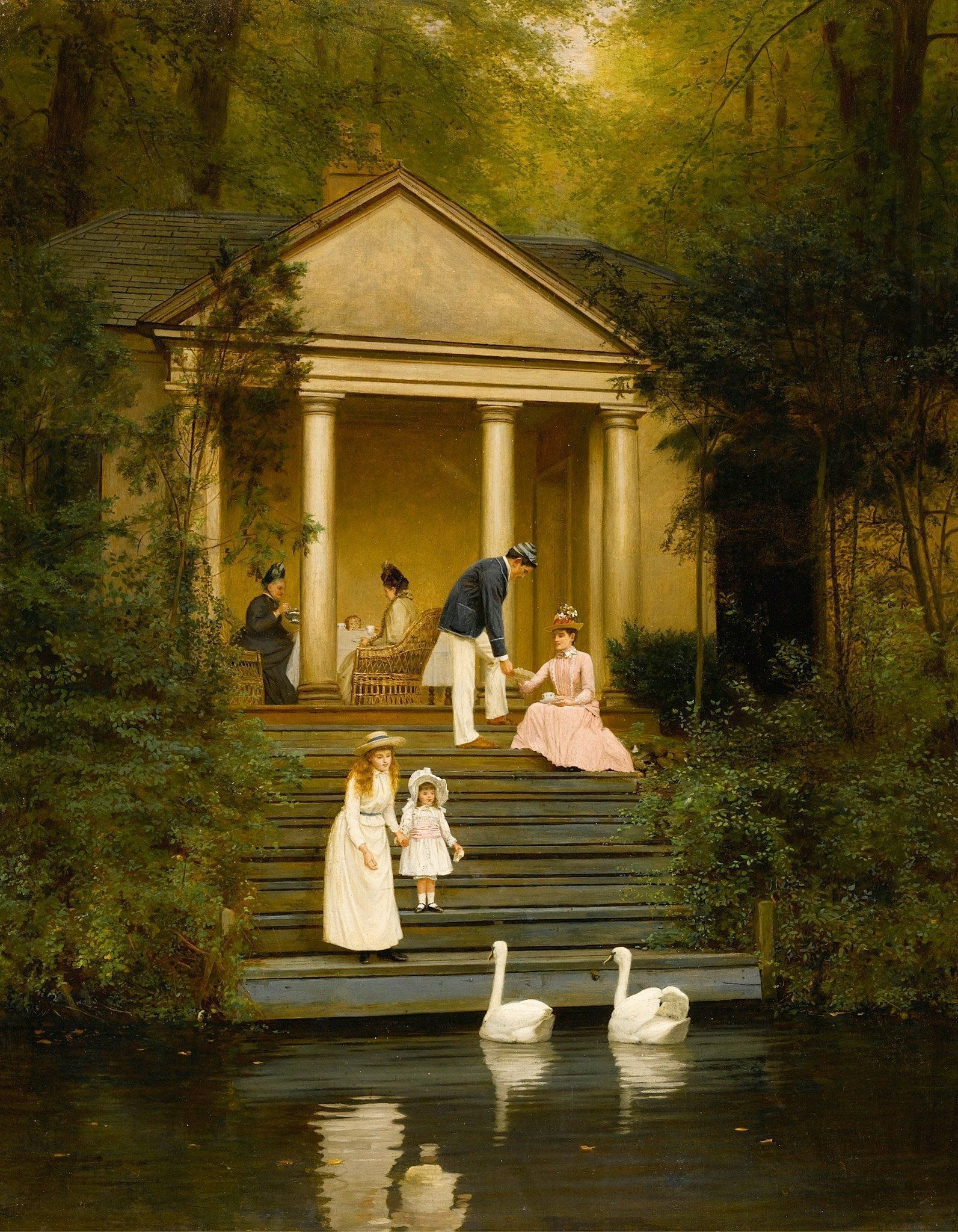
Feeding the Swans

Edith Hayllar (1860–1948) was a British artist born to James Hayllar, an acclaimed Victorian artist known for his genre paintings. Edith Hayllar had four brothers and four sisters, of whom, Jessica Hayllar (1858–1940), Mary Hayllar (1863–1950), and Kate Hayllar (fl. 1883–1900), also became notable artists in their own right; all received their training from their father and exhibited at the Royal Academy. Together, residing in an estate in Wallingford, England, all four girls followed a Victorian system of four to ten art classes a day to ensure proper mastery of basic art techniques such as proportions. In addition to their rigorous training schedule, the girls spent the rest of their time at the estate engaging in relaxing activities such as outdoor sports, plain air painting, and gardening. These leisurely domestic scenes became the subject of the sisters’ most renowned paintings.

Of all the sisters, Jessica Hayllar and Edith Hayllar were the most well-known painters, both specializing in genre painting like their father. Edith Hayllar’s paintings, unlike other female artists at the time, did not challenge the terms of "feminine dependency" but rather played an integral role in shaping the representation of women and domesticity together by painting scenes of women in domestic interiors with their families. Hayllar’s painting style emphasized symmetry and orderliness, showing women running a well-organized household and clearly delineating a woman’s role at any given time in their lives.

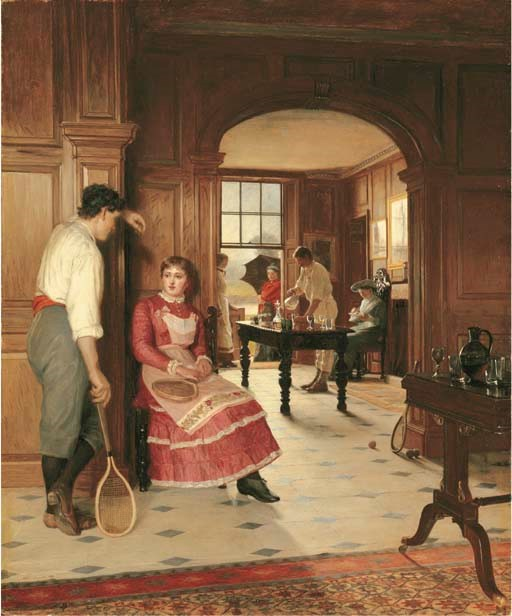
Summer Shower

Hayllar had paintings shown almost every year from the 1880s–1890s at the Institute for Oil Painters and Dudley’s Gallery. In the year 1881 she had her first piece exhibited at the Royal Society of British Artists in London and then a year later, in 1882, another piece was shown in the Royal Academy of Arts. Of all her paintings, Edith Hayllar’s most famous is a piece, entitled A Summer Shower from 1883, showing a young man with a badminton racket courting a woman reclining in a chair next to him and was called "one of the most charming genre scenes of the nineteenth century." She retired from painting when she married Rev. Bruce MacKay in approximately 1900.
