= George Dunlop Leslie =

English painter

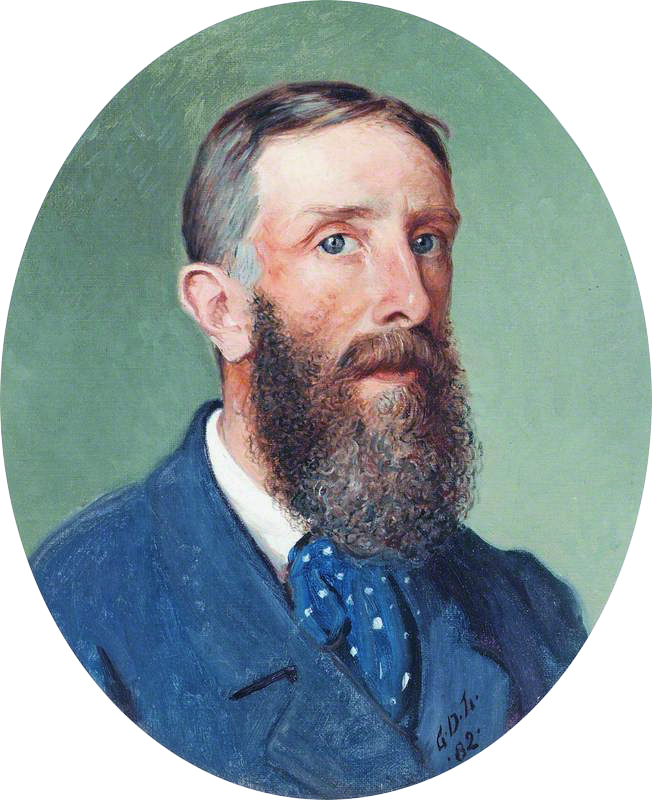
- Self-portrait (1882)
- Born: 2 June 1835; London, England
- Died: 21 February 1921 (aged 85)
- Elected: Royal Academy

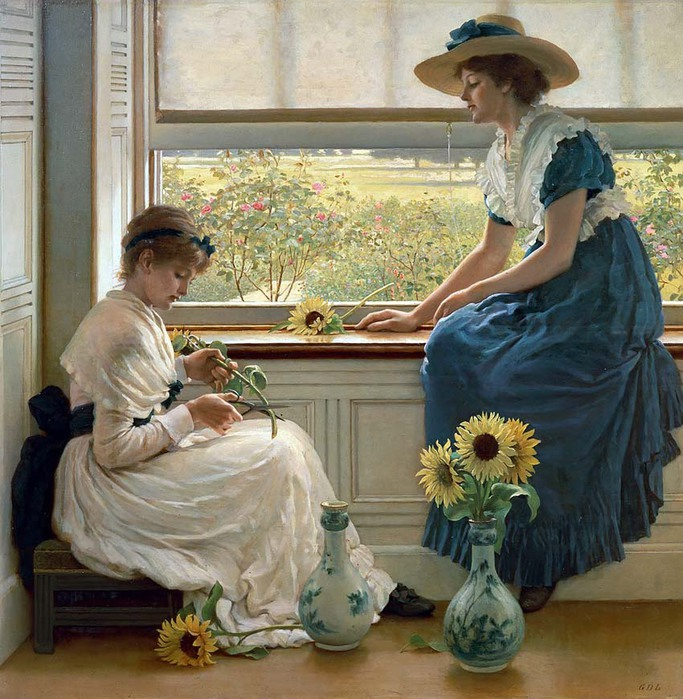
Sun and Moon Flowers (1890)

George Dunlop Leslie RA (2 July 1835 – 21 February 1921) was a British genre painter, author and illustrator. He worked mainly in oils, but also watercolour.

After painting subjects in various genres and styles in his early career, he found great success with meticulously painted pictures of pretty women, singly or in groups, mostly in expensive contemporary dress, and performing everyday activities, or nothing much at all. These became the bulk of his output. He also painted some twilight landscapes.

== Life and work ==
Leslie was born into an artistic family, his father was the notable genre painter Charles Robert Leslie RA, and his uncle Robert Leslie was a marine artist. He studied art first at Cary's Art Academy, then from 1854 at the Royal Academy. His first exhibition at the Academy was in 1859, and he showed his work every year thereafter. He became an Associate (ARA) in 1868 and a full Royal Academician (RA) in 1876.

George Dunlop Leslie lived early on in St John's Wood (London), and was part of the St John's Wood Clique, a group of artists who favoured light-hearted genre subjects. From 1884–1901 he was resident at "Riverside", St. Leonard's Lane, Wallingford, Oxfordshire. His sister Mary Leslie (1833–1907), also an artist, lived at "Cromwell Lodge" next door. Fellow artist, James Hayllar, was also a resident of the village and they painted a portrait of Queen Victoria together for her Golden Jubilee in 1887. From 1906 he lived at "Compton House" in Lindfield, Sussex

His early works, such as Matilda (1860) showed the strong influence of the Pre-Raphaelites, but he settled into a more academic, aesthetic, style of painting with the aim of showing "pictures from the sunny side of English domestic life". He often used children as subjects and his work was praised by John Ruskin for its portrayal of the "sweet quality of English girlhood". One of his pictures, This is the Way we Wash our Clothes was used as a poster in an advertising campaign for soap. Despite its apparently trivial subject matter, however, Leslie's work was highly regarded by critics of the time.

In 1889 during his time at Riverside house in Wallingford Leslie is credited with painting four angel murals in St Leonards Church.

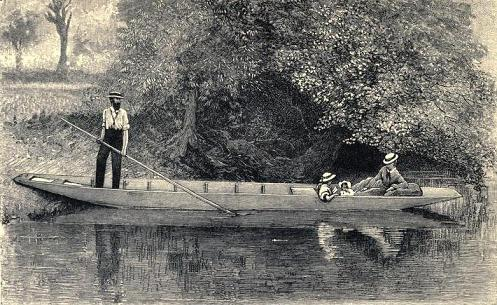
The author's punt (from Leslie's book Our river, 1888)

Leslie was also an author and had several books published. Our river (1888), Letters to Marco (1893) and Riverside letters (1896) were all illustrated by him in black and white, and based on personal observations of life and nature in his local area. He also wrote a history of the early years of the Royal Academy - The inner life of the Royal Academy.

Leslie was married to Lydia. They had a daughter Alice (depicted in his painting Alice in Wonderland) and a son Peter Leslie (1877–1953) who was also an artist. Amongst Leslie's artistic friends and acquaintances were Sir Edwin Landseer, Frederick Walker and Henry Stacy Marks. He died at Lindfield in Sussex.

In June 2000, The Daughters of Eve, considered to be one of Leslie's finest paintings, and which had hung unnoticed for 40 years in a south Wales school (Llantarnam Comprehensive), was sold for £170,000 to a private collector. The money raised was used to fund much needed building work to the school.

== Work ==
Sun and Moon Flowers

This picture was painted in 1890, from one of the windows of the artist's drawing-room at Wallingford, looking out over the garden to the meadow on the opposite bank of the river. According to Dunlop: "I arranged the two girls by the window. One is seated on a stool on the ground, and the other is on the seat of the deeply recessed window. The whole was painted direct from nature. A young lady friend posed for one of the figures, while .. the other is from Kitty Lambert, a favourite model of mine. The two girls are arranging sunflowers in a vase. In the picture some of the sunflowers are the usual bright yellow ones, and others, which I call moonflowers, are far paler. It is painted on canvas, very simply..."

== Constable controversy ==
Leslie provoked a brief but bitter controversy in 1893, when he reviewed a major loan exhibition of Old Masters at the Royal Academy of Arts in London, and rejected the authenticity of two paintings attributed to John Constable, who was a friend of his father. One was then called The Keeper's Cottage, and owned by the painter and dealer James Orrock, the other a Salisbury Cathedral owned by a different collector. A furious row in the press ensued, including a riposte by Orrock full of invective; Orrock began to take legal action, before Leslie withdrew. Ironically, the opinion of the Lady Lever Art Gallery (where the Keeper's Cottage is now held with its original name, Cottage At East Bergholt) is that, of the twenty "Constable"s in the museum that came via Orrock, that is the only genuine one. The museum's view is that it is "now recognised as one of the artist's finest late works, and particularly revealing about Constable's vision and method of work".

The leading critic Claude Phillips, reviewing the 1893 exhibition in The Academy, expressed his "wonder that their genuineness should have been called into question in such light-hearted fashion and on such insufficient grounds", while also criticising the "too enthusiastic praise lavished on the Keeper's Cottage by its naturally irate owner, himself a painter of eminence and a recognised authority on all that pertains to English landscape art".

== Gallery ==
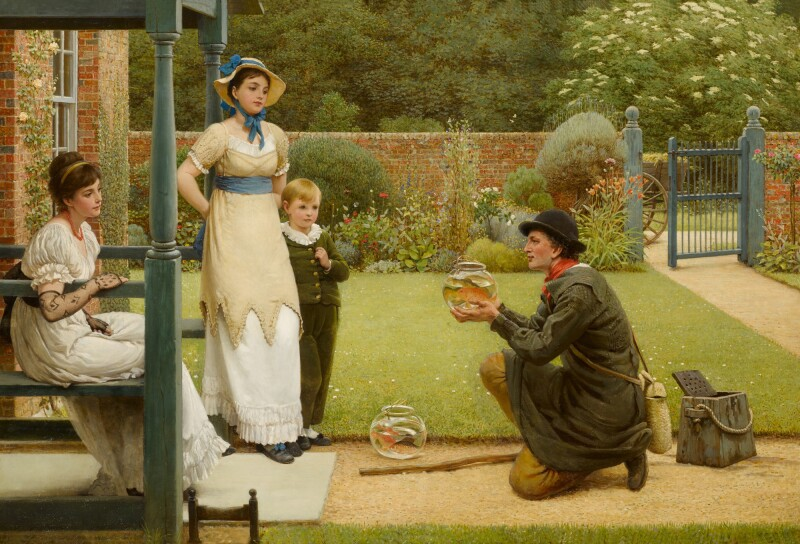
The Goldfish Seller

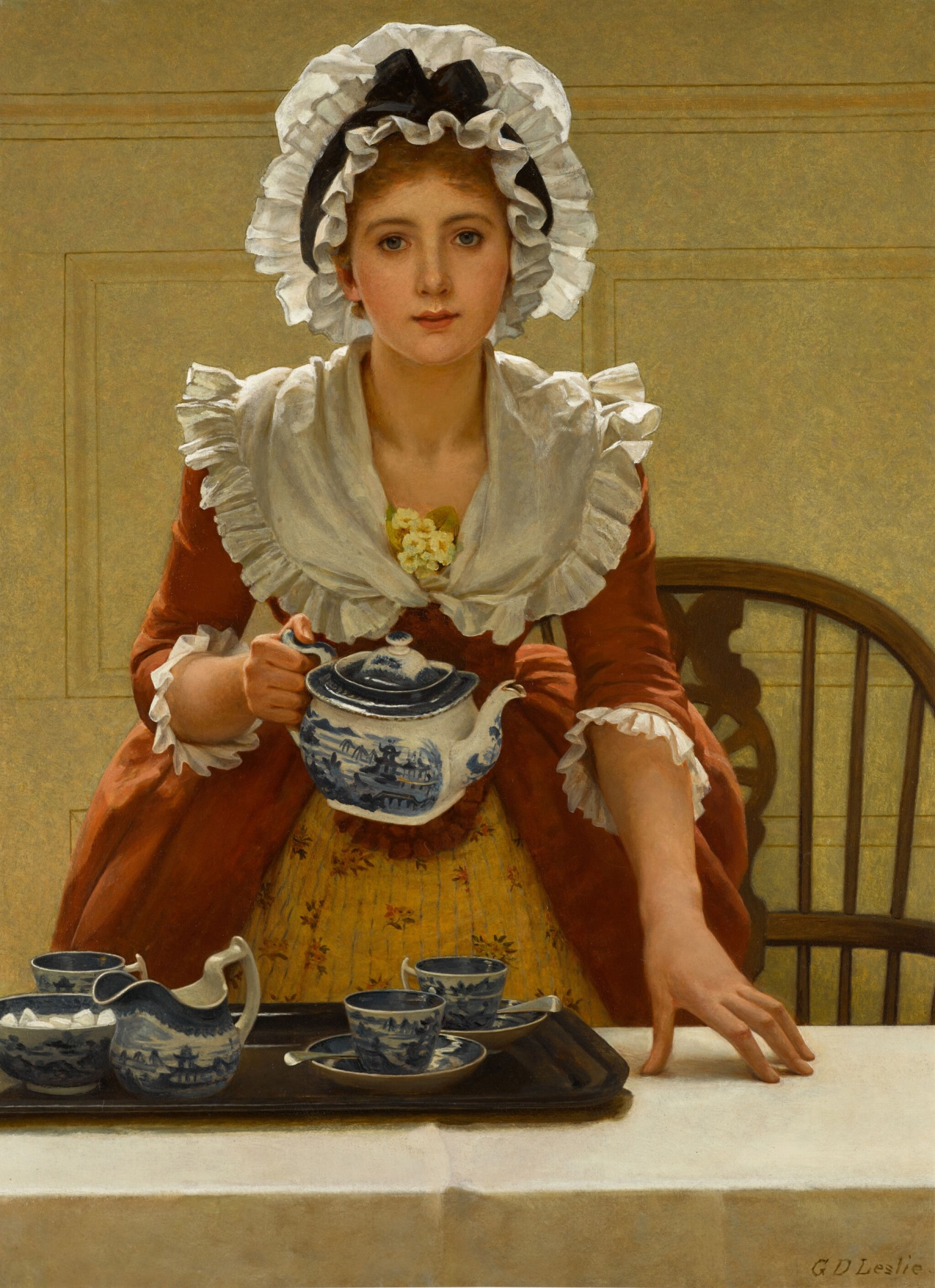
Tea

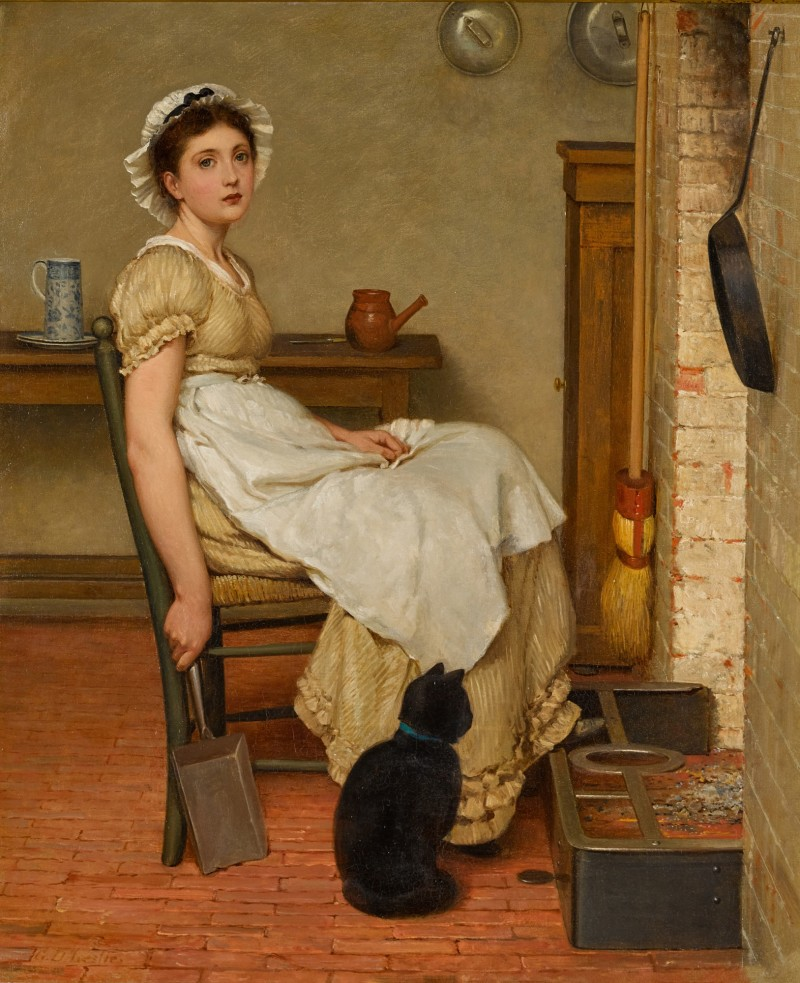
Her First Place

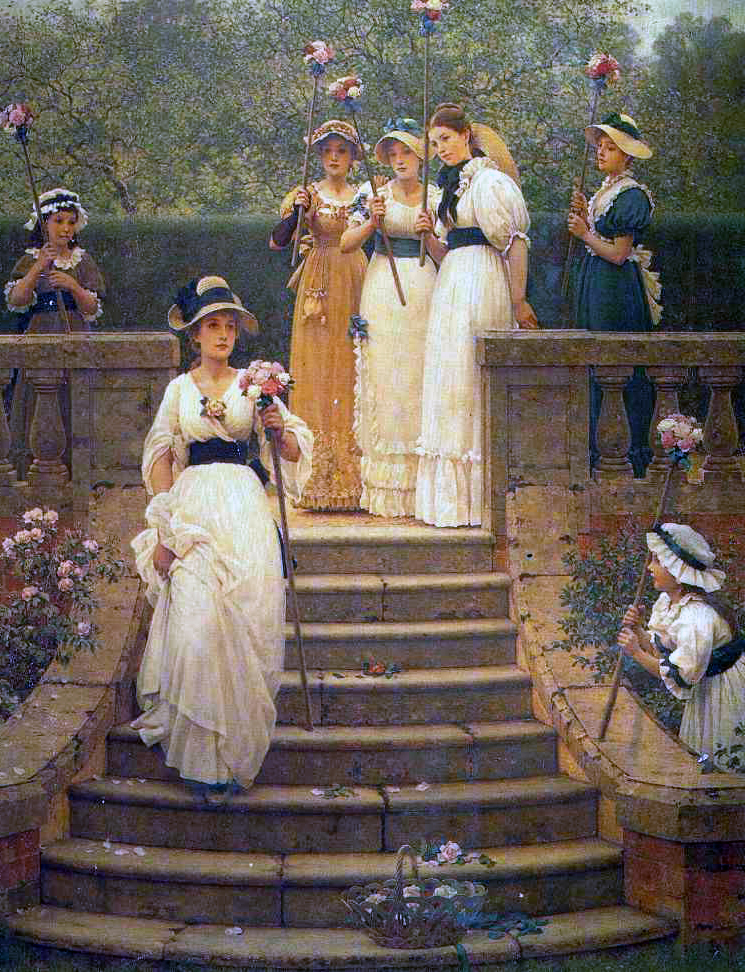
The Rose Queen, 1892

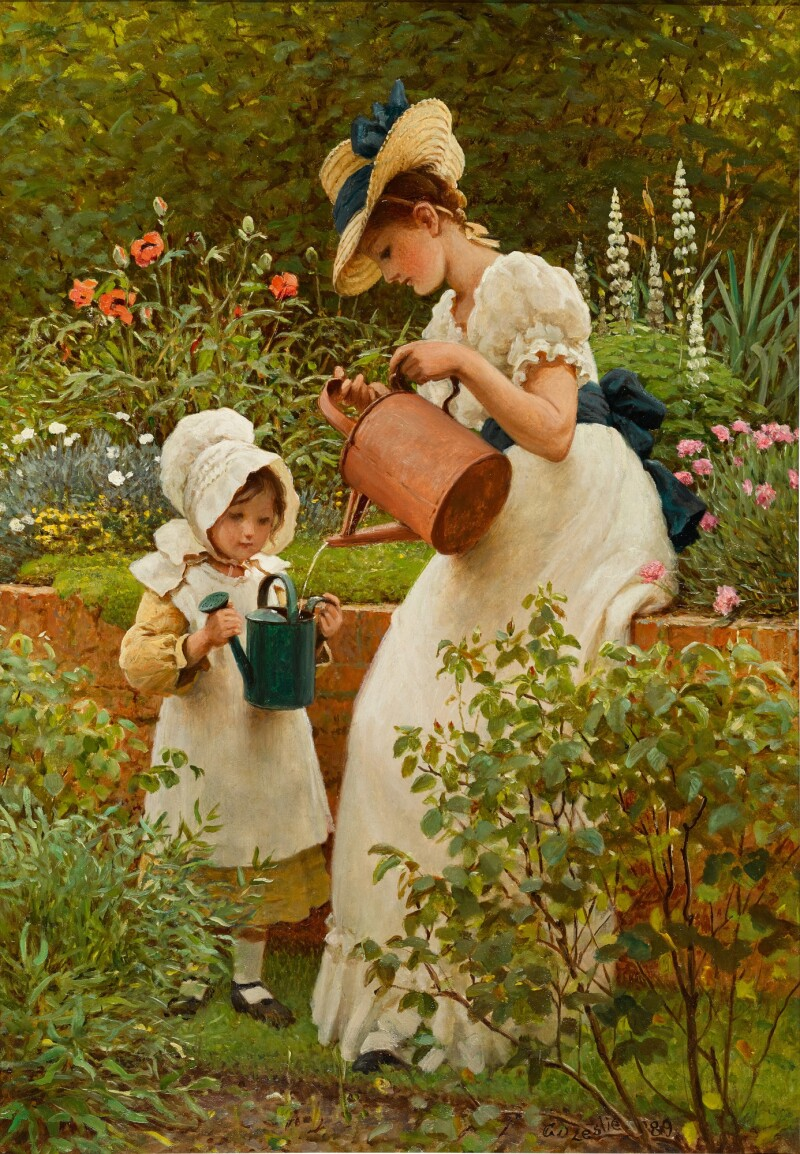
The Young Gardener

Roses, 1880

== Books ==
- Our River (Bradbury, Agnew & Co., 1888).
- Letters to Marco (Macmillan and Co., 1893).
- Riverside letters; a continuation of "Letters to Marco" (Macmillan and Co., 1896).
- The inner life of the Royal Academy, with an account of its schools and exhibitions principally in the reign of Queen Victoria (London: John Murray, 1914)
