= James Hayllar =

British artist (1829–1920)

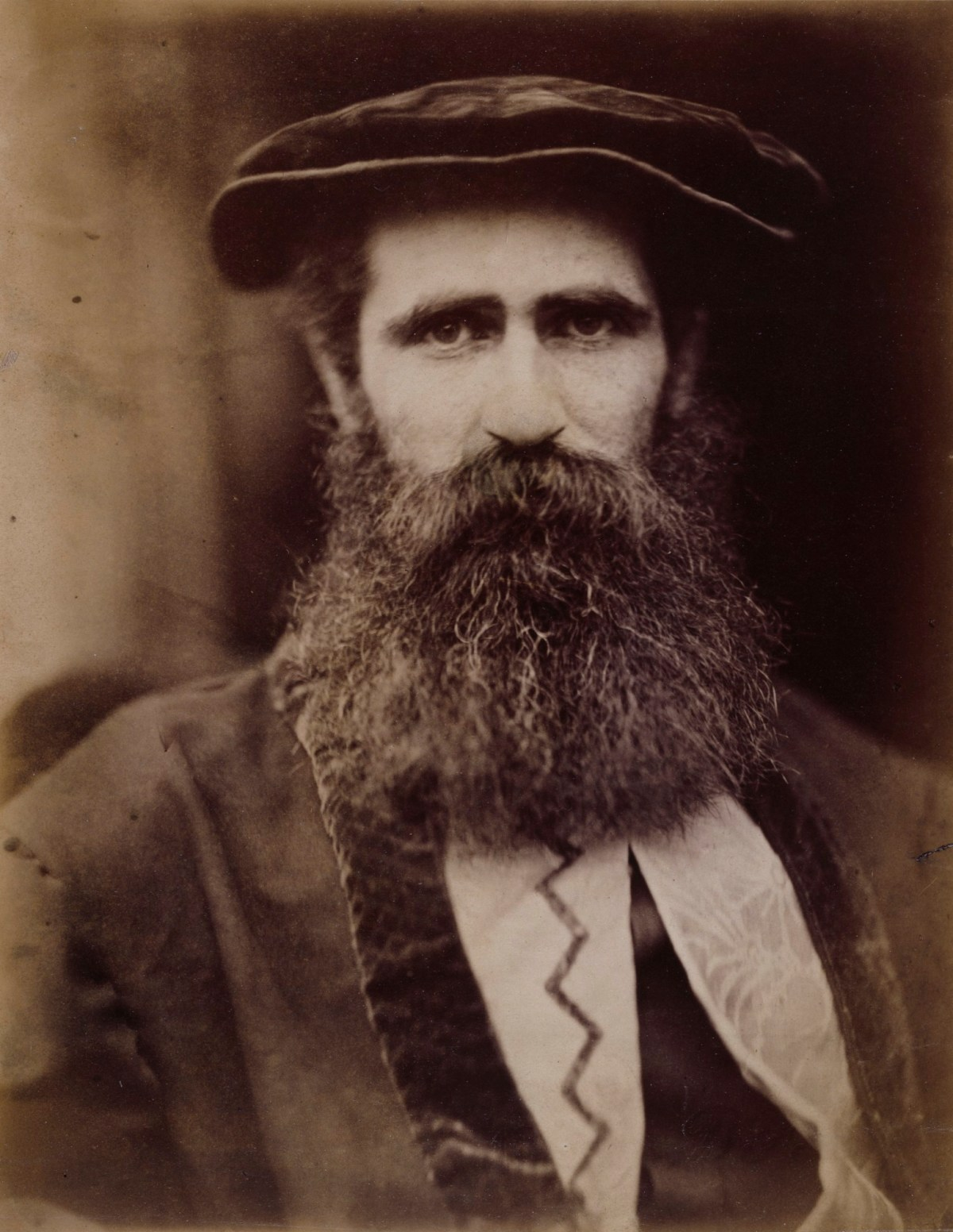
- Born: 1829; Chichester, Sussex (now West Sussex), England
- Died: 1920 (aged 90–91); Bournemouth
- Occupation: Artist
- Spouse(s): Edith, Phoebe (Cavell)

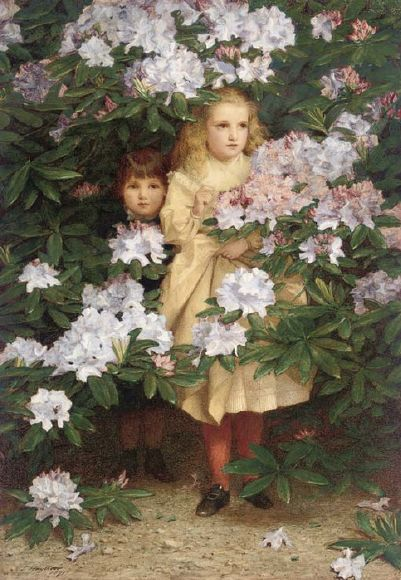
Hide and seek

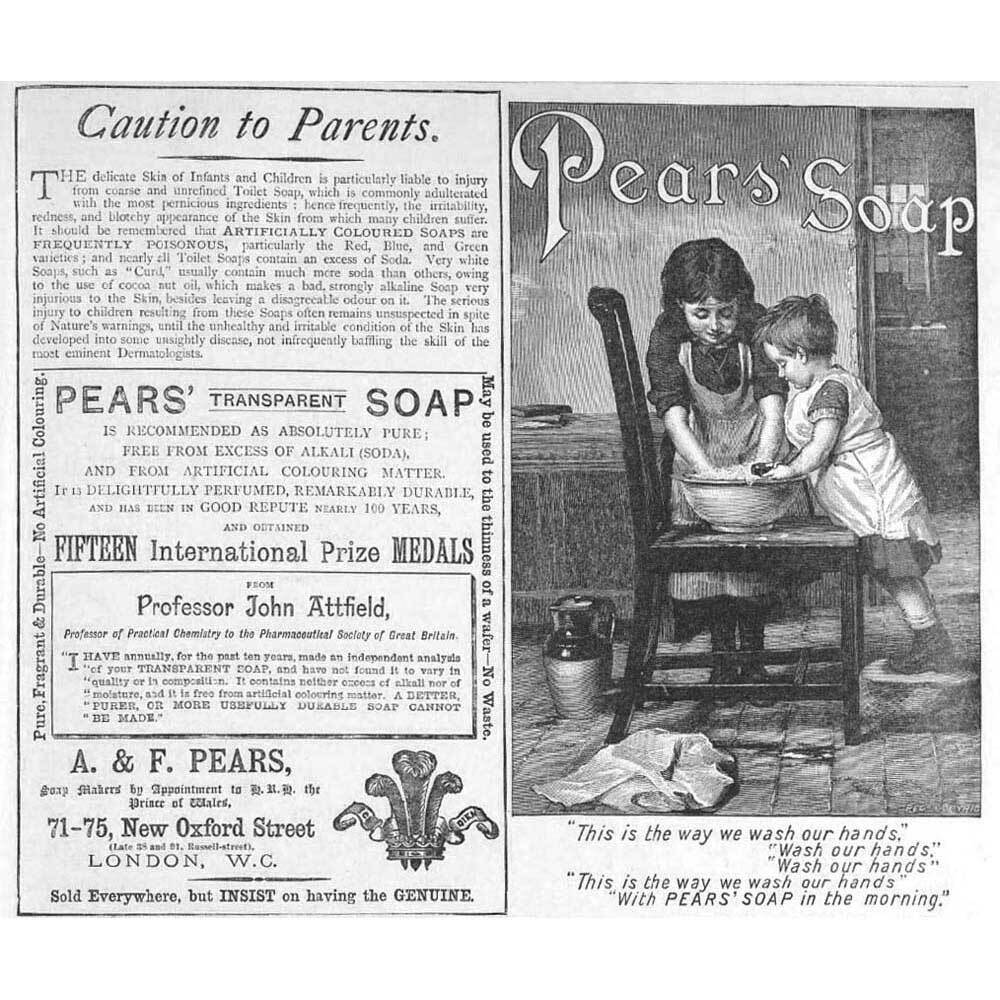
PEARS SOAP This is the Way We Wash Our Hands-Victorian advert 1888.

James Hayllar (1829–1920) was an English genre, portrait and landscape painter. Four of his daughters Edith Hayllar, Jessica Hayllar, Mary Hayllar and Kate Hayllar were also notable painters.

== Life and work ==
Hayllar was born in Chichester in Sussex (now West Sussex), and received his training in art at Cary's Art Academy in London; he painted Cary's portrait in 1851. He went on to study at the Royal Academy.

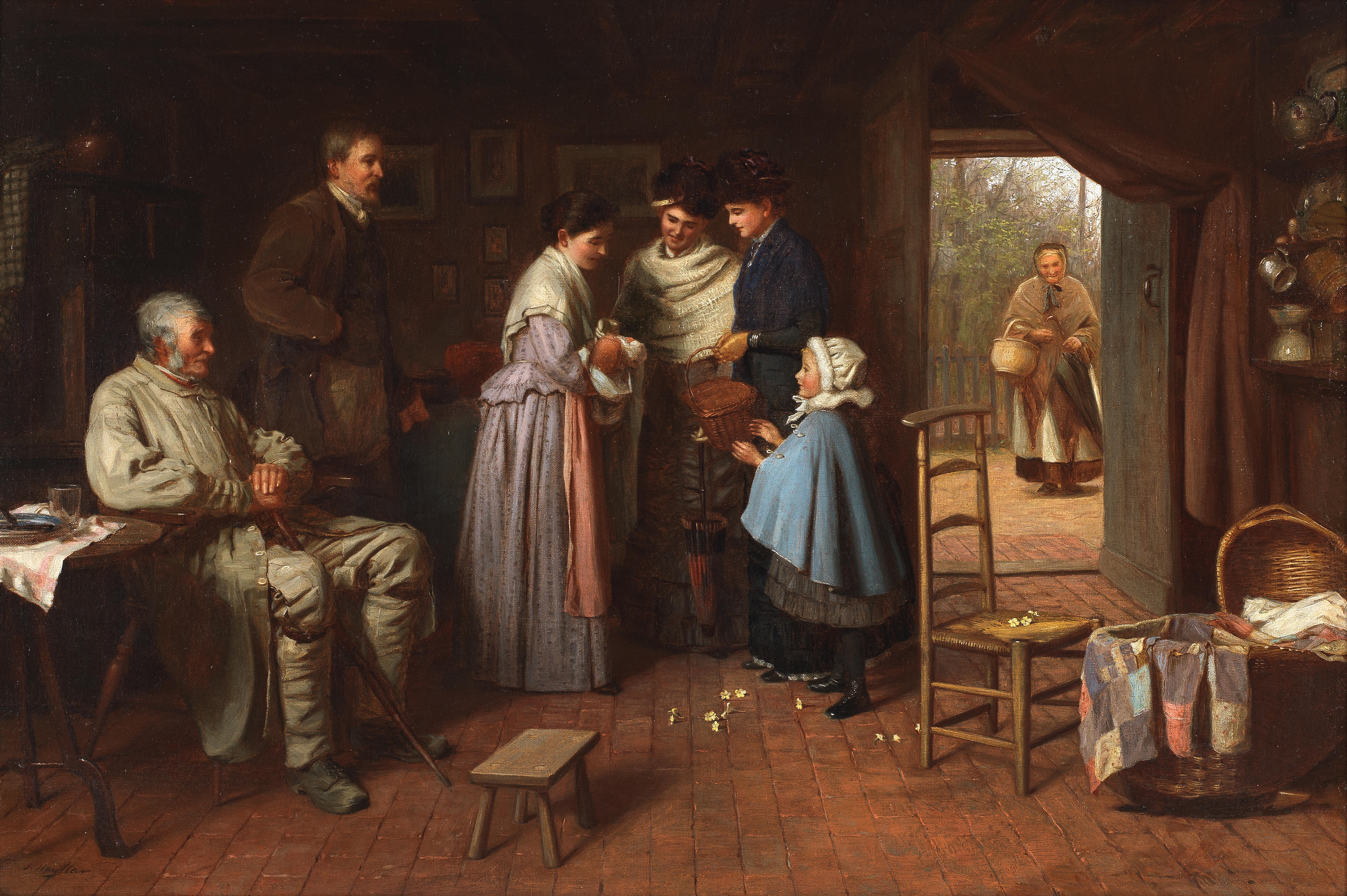
The first born at the cottage. Oil on canvas. Signed J Hayllar

Hayllar travelled in Italy from 1851–53. He was a regular exhibitor at the Royal Academy from 1851–98, and also showed work at the British Institution and the Royal Society of British Artists (RBA) - of which he was a member. He first became known as a portrait painter but later turned his brush to genre art, often featuring pretty young girls (see first painting); his work became very popular. With George Dunlop Leslie (who also lived in Wallingford at the same time), he painted a large portrait of Queen Victoria to celebrate her Golden Jubilee in 1887 - the painting now hangs in Wallingford Town Hall, along with another 10 of his paintings. The Art UK website also indicates the location of further works by Hayllar in other UK public galleries. The Victoria and Albert Museum possesses his oil painting Granville Sharp the Abolitionist Rescuing a Slave from the Hands of His Master Hayllar's work was also used for advertising purposes. In 1887 Thomas J. Barratt bought the painting Soap Suds for use as an advertisement for Pears (soap). It was renamed This is the way we wash our hands.

It is interesting to note that Hayllar could sometimes receive rather mixed criticism, as shown in The Atheneum's report on the entries in the 1861 exhibition of the RBA. It is an expression of regret at the large number of minor works submitted by such an able artist

Mr Hayllar is an artist of the Lake school, that delights in flaring colour heated to excess. His Vespers (10), a French paysanne, kneeling on a prie-dieu, is clever and showy. Similarly, but superior in solidity, is The Opera Box (50), study of a lady's head in an opera cloak-pretty but common.These trifles are ever snares for facile painters like Mr Hayllar; we regret to see the number of these he produces, remembering better things by him.

The local press could be more positive, particularly where a full-sized painting is described, as shown by the Reading Mercury's reasonably accurate description of The first born at the cottage in 1881.

MR HAYLLAR'S NEW PICTURE.-Mr Hayllar has just completed a grand new painting, which will be sent to the Royal Academy. The subject is 'The New Baby'. This the mother, a cottager, is showing with maternal pride to two young ladies, while a child, who accompanies them, in her eagerness to nurse it, has dropped some flowers on the floor. The father stands aside, and the grandparents are also present, watching the scene. All the characters are taken from well-known residents, and are most readily recognised. The furniture in the cottage, the clothes, and the surroundings are most minutely and graphically depicted, and the painting is a most beautiful and complete representation of a familiar scene in English cottage life.

There is a photograph of the painting, which was displayed at the Royal Academy exhibition in 1881, in an article by Christopher Wood, in the April 1974 edition of The Connoisseur. It is thought that the two women admiring the baby are Jessica and Edith Hayllar. In 1890 'NINETY FINISHED PICTURES & SKETCHES IN OIL & WATERCOLOUR' by James Hayllar were auctioned by Christie Manson and Woods. Of the works sold, six had been exhibited at the Royal Academy, including The first born at the cottage.

He married Edith Phoebe Cavell (1827–1899), the aunt of Edith Cavell - the famous British nurse who was to be shot by the Germans for "treason" during World War I. They lived at a house called "Castle Priory" in Wallingford on the River Thames in Berkshire (now Oxfordshire) from 1875–99; scenes from village life in the area often featured in his work there. The couple went on to have 9 children, of whom four became recognised artists (see below). After the death of his wife in 1899, he moved to Bournemouth.

== Family ==
Hayllar had four sons and five daughters, four of whom, Edith Hayllar (1860–1948), Jessica Hayllar (1858–1940), Mary Hayllar (1863–c. 1950), and Kate Hayllar (fl. 1883–1900), became notable artists in their own right; all received their training from their father and exhibited at the Royal Academy.In 1890, when James Hayllar was aged 61, Edith painted his portrait, which now hangs in Wallingford Town Hall.

== Gallery ==
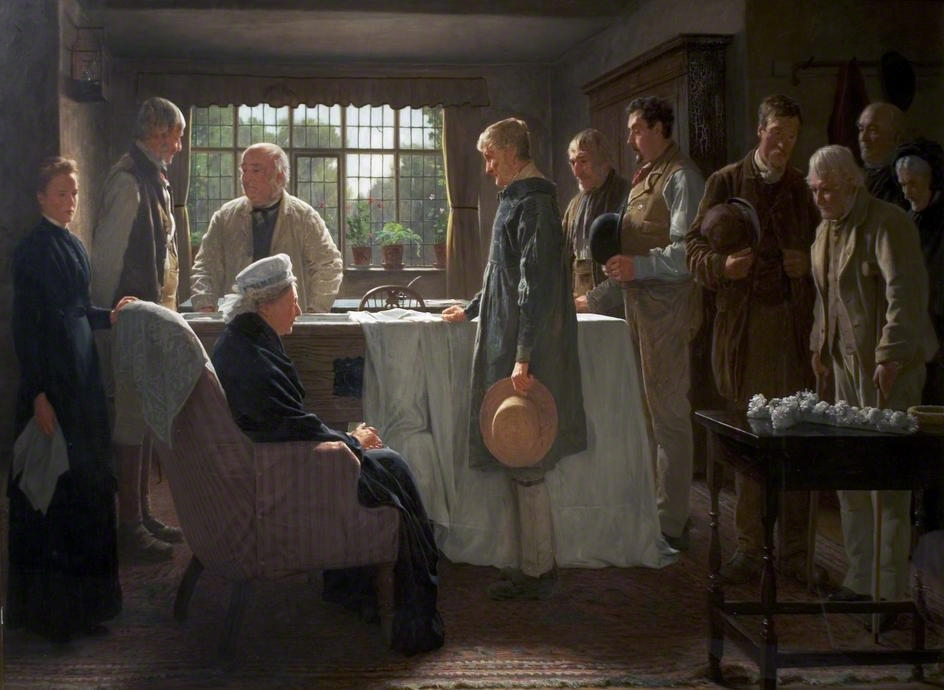
The Old Master, 1883

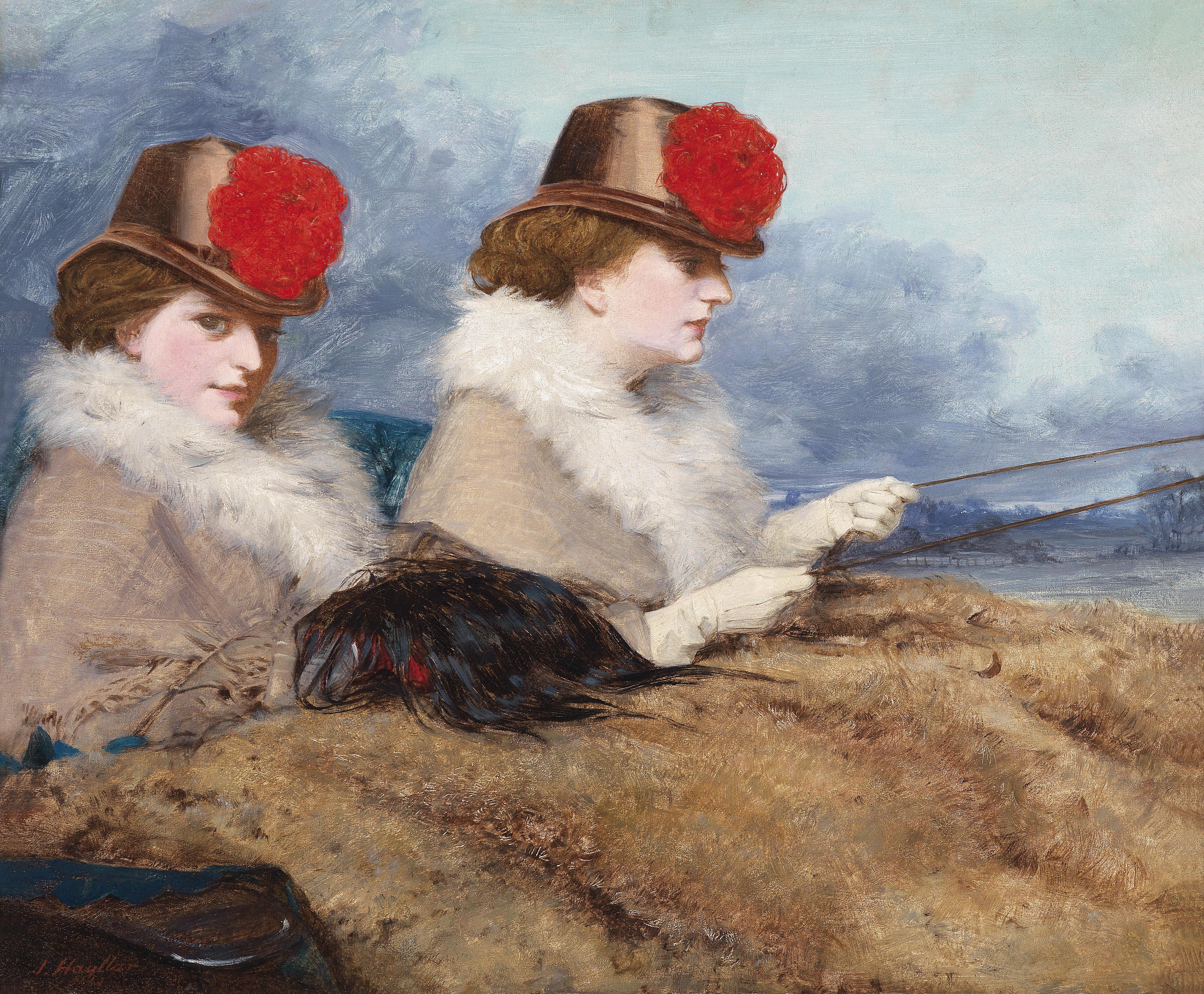
Two ladies on a carriage ride, 1860

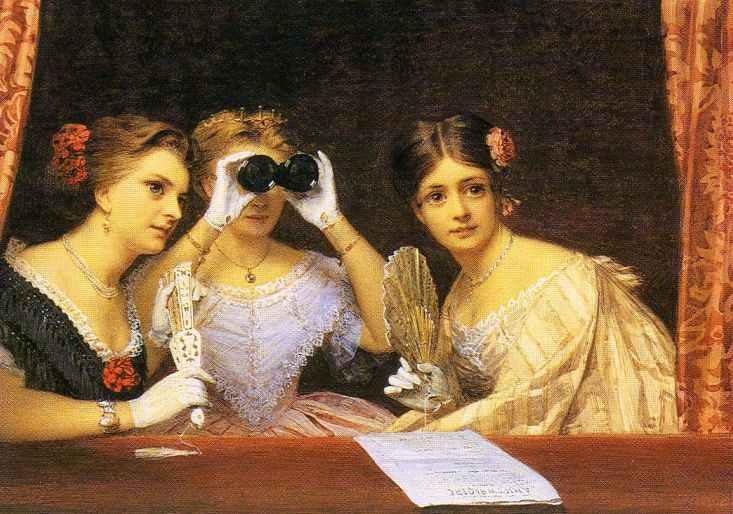
The Opera Box, 1866

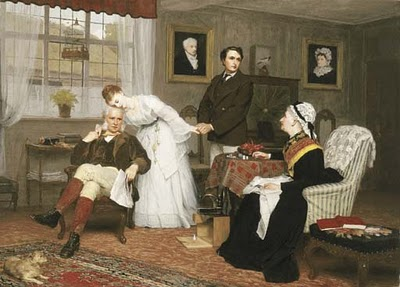
The Only Daughter, 1875

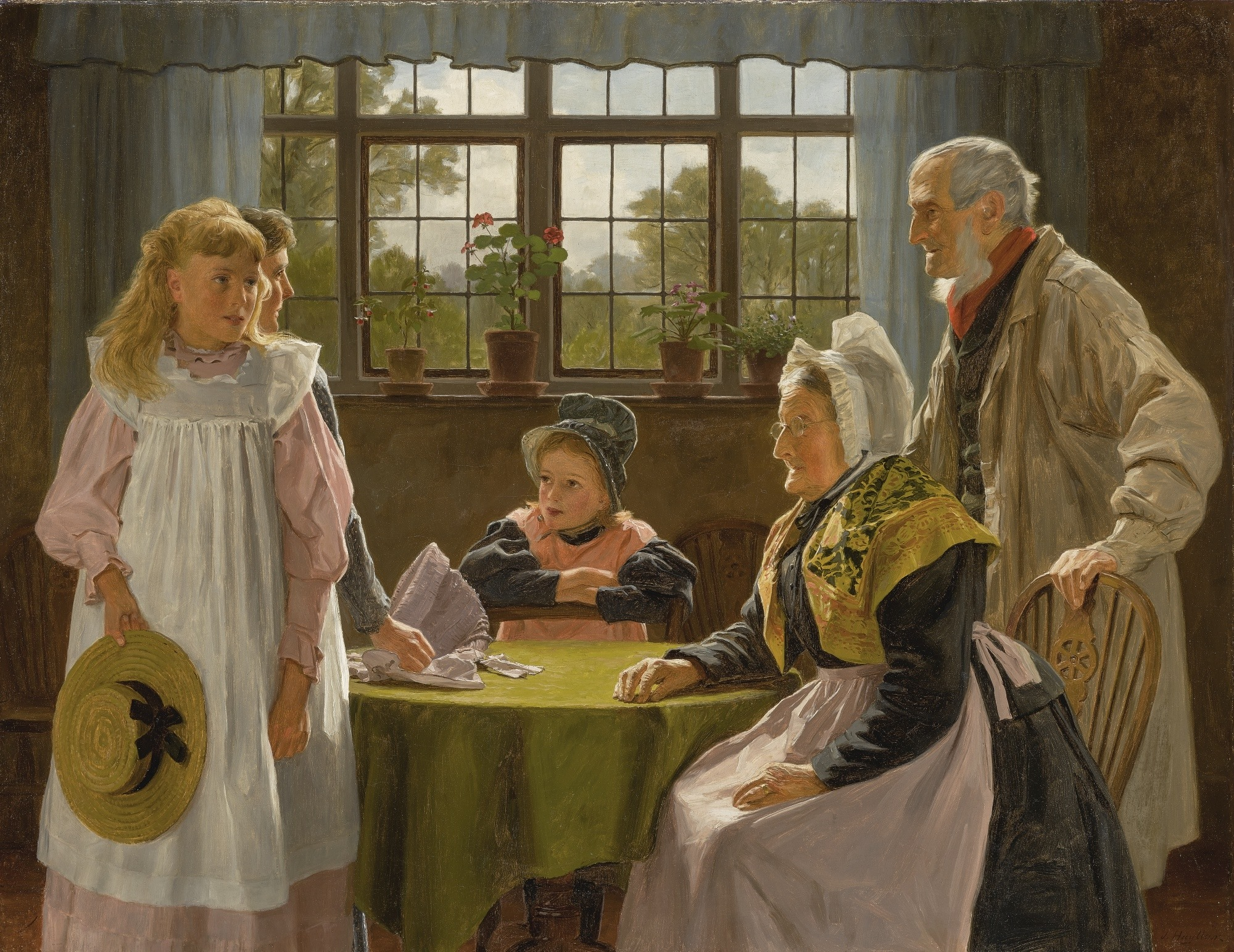
As tall as mother, 1898

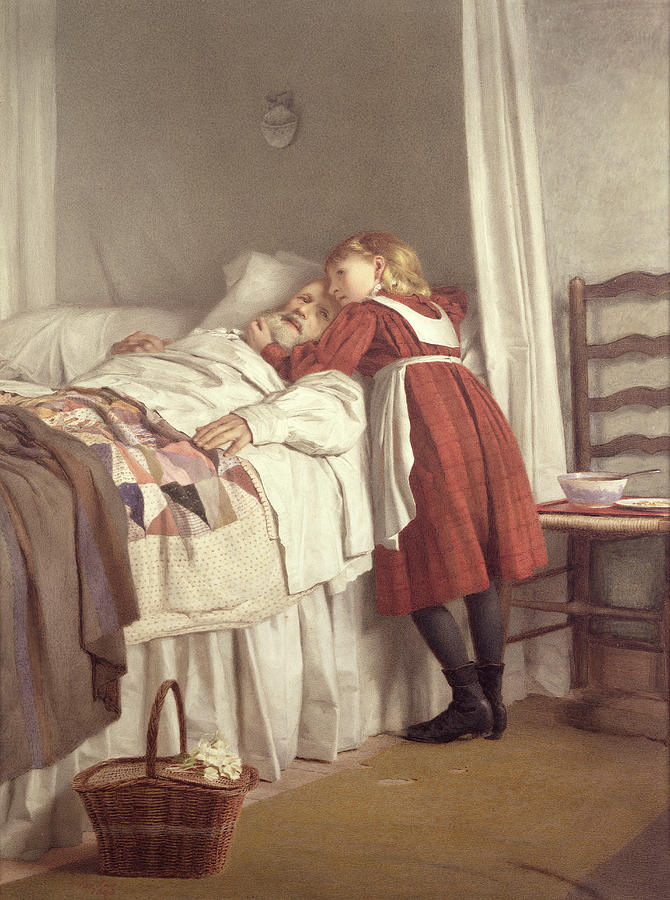
Grandfather's Little Nurse

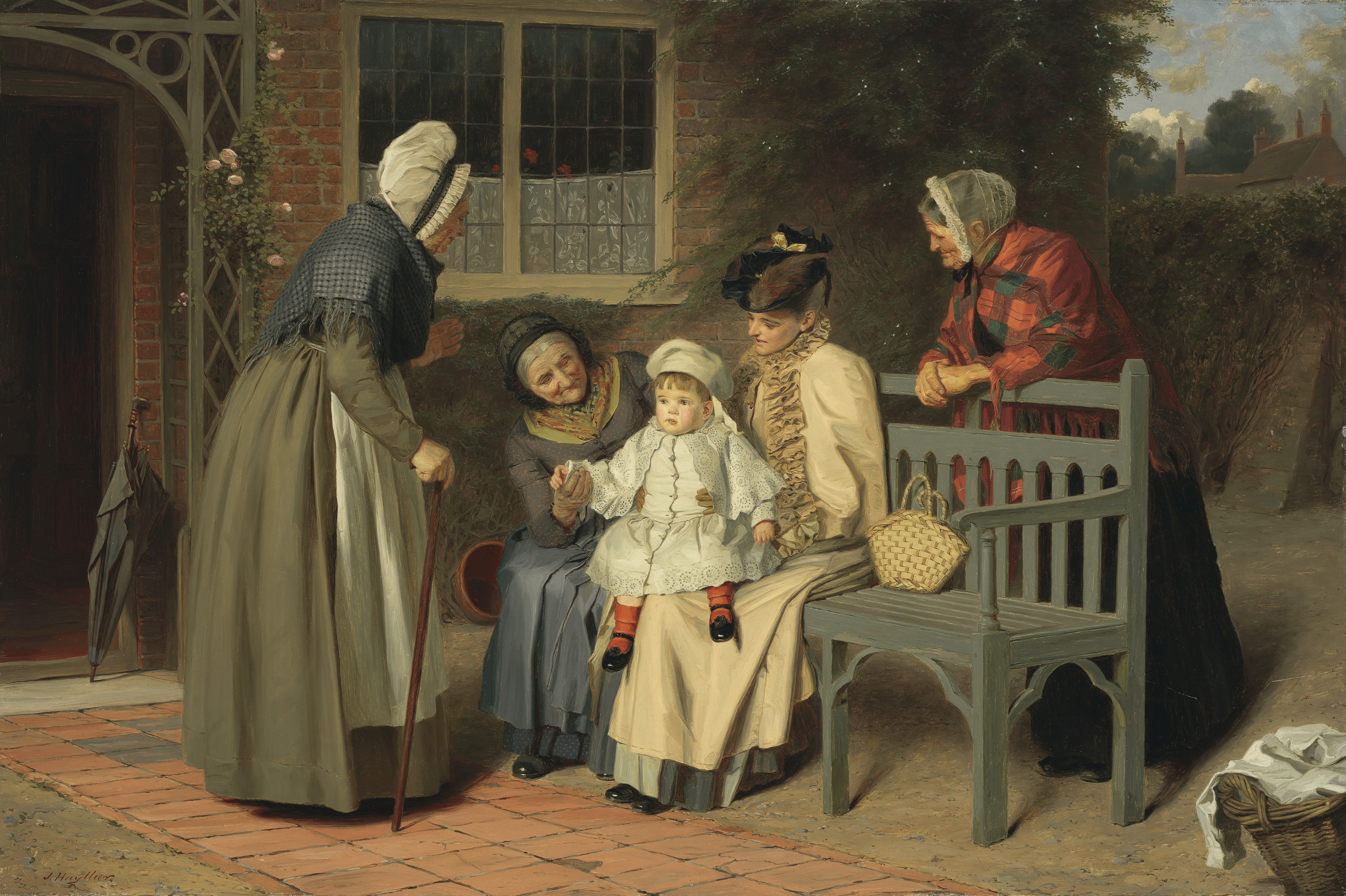
The Center of Attraction
