= Appleton =

Appleton may refer to:

== People and fictional characters ==
- Appleton (surname), including a list of people and fictional characters
  - Appleton family, an American political, religious and mercantile family
  - Victor Appleton, house pseudonym used by authors of the Tom Swift book series
- Appleton P. Clark Jr. (1865–1955), American architect from Washington, D.C.
- Appleton Milo Harmon (1820–1877), American farmer, businessman, builder and early member of the LDS Church
- Appleton A. Mason (1880–1938), American college football and basketball coach
- Appleton Oaksmith (1828–1887), American politician

== Places ==
=== Australia ===
- Appleton Dock

=== Canada ===
- Appleton, Newfoundland and Labrador
- Appleton, Ontario

=== United Kingdom ===
- Appleton, a deserted medieval village site in the parish of Flitcham with Appleton, Norfolk, England
- Appleton, Oxfordshire, England
- Appleton Laboratory, Ditton Park, now Rutherford Appleton Laboratory, Harwell, England
- Appleton-le-Moors, Yorkshire, England
- Appleton Thorn, Warrington, Cheshire, England
- Appleton, Warrington, Cheshire, England
- Appleton, a northern area of Widnes, Cheshire, England
  - Appleton railway station, a closed station in northern Widnes, England
- Appleton Wiske, North Yorkshire, England
- East Appleton, North Yorkshire, England

=== United States ===
- Appleton, Arkansas
- Appleton, Illinois
- Appleton, Maine
- Appleton, Maryland
- Appleton Farms, Ipswich, Massachusetts
- Appleton, Minnesota
- Appleton, New York
- Appleton, Ohio
- Appleton, South Carolina
- Appleton, Tennessee
- Appleton, Washington
- Appleton, Wisconsin
- Old Appleton, Missouri
- Appleton City, Missouri
- Appleton Township (disambiguation)

== Other uses ==
- Appleton, Indiana, a fictional town from Jason Robert Brown's musical 13
- Appleton (crater), a lunar crater
- Appleton (music duo), a musical duo comprising All Saints members Natalie and Nicole Appleton
- Appleton Cattle Company, an Australian beef producer which bought several large properties from S. Kidman & Co in 2023
- Appleton International Airport, outside Appleton, Wisconsin, United States
- Appleton spotlight, specialized moveable automobile spotlights (used especially for delivery or police vehicles)
- D. Appleton & Company, a former publisher of books and textbooks, based in New York and Boston
- Appleton Estates and Appleton Special Rum, Jamaican rum brands under J. Wray and Nephew Ltd.

== See also ==
- Appletons' Cyclopædia of American Biography
- Appletun
