= Mary Hayllar =

British genre painter

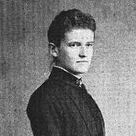
- at her wedding
- Born: 18 November 1862; Mecklenburgh Square
- Died: Stone Hall and The Lodge
- Occupation: Painter
- Parent(s): James Hayllar
- Relatives: Kate Hayllar

(Alexandra) Mary Hayllar later Mary Watkins Wells (1862 – 1950) was a British artist from a family that included five talented painters. Led by their father, she and her sisters were trained in skills that saw them exhibiting at the Royal Academy.

== Life ==
Mary Hayllar was born in 1862 in Mecklenburgh Square, in London, to James Hayllar and Ellen Phoebe (born Cavell). Her father was a trained painter and in time she had eight siblings, four sisters and four brothers. They lived at Castle Priory in Wallingford and her father arranged painting lessons for them starting at ten and ending at four. Their paintings were of the people, places and scenes around them. The girls would also enjoy a leisurely life of tennis, gardening and painting. She and her sisters learned to swim and to row and her father would serve as cox when they rowed 27 miles to the Henley Royal Regatta.

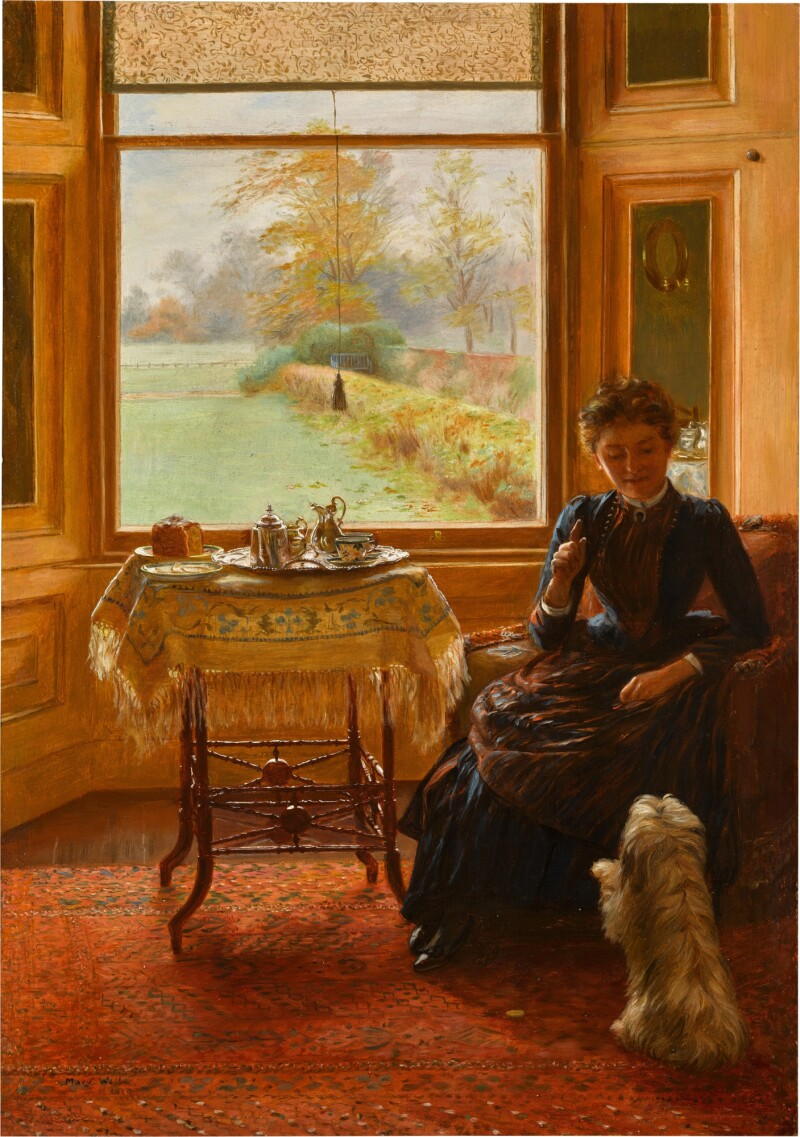
For a Good Boy, 1880

Her father and three of her sisters exhibited numerous paintings in the Royal Academy. Mary's and Jessica's first paintings to be exhibited were in 1880. Jessica's painting was called "Going to my uncles" and Mary's painting was called "For a Good Boy". Her father had first exhibited there thirty years before and they all continued as they were joined by her sister Edith in 1882 and Kate in 1885. Mary was the least prolific of the artist sisters as her paintings of children and domestic scenes were only at the academy until 1885. Her paintings which are rare are known for laden tea tables, they are included in For a Good Boy, Tennis Party and Breakfast. In total she painted about 24 paintings during her painting period that lasted about five years.

Mary married Henry Watkins Wells in 1887 and ceased exhibiting paintings. She left the family home but not Walligford. She must have visited as she and her children appear in her sisters paintings. Her husband was the mayor of Wallingford in 1902. They employed nine domestic servants and one of them later reported that their home had lots of paintings but Mary never painted. It is thought that Mary thought that she was well taught rather than a talented artist.

Her mother's relative was the nurse Edith Cavell who was shot by firing squad and her eldest son, Henry Maurice Watkins Wells was also killed during World War One in 1916.

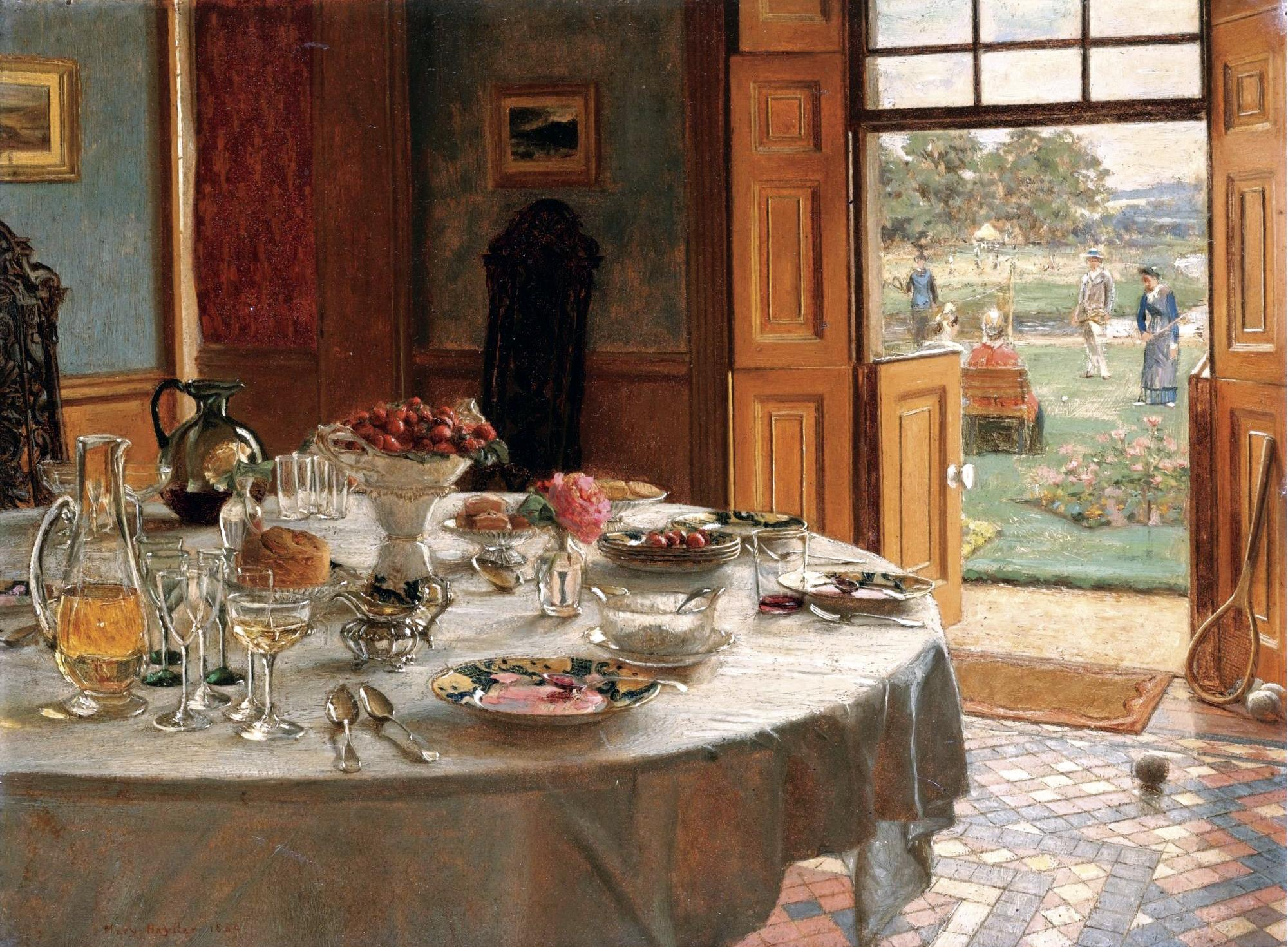
The Tennis Party, 1880

She died in 1950. Her painting of Lawn Tennis Season is in Southampton City Art Gallery.

== Private life ==
Mary Hayllar and Henry had six children. Dora Watkins was born in 1886 and Henry Maurice was born in 1888. Her second daughter, Muriel was born in 1891 and became Muriel McMullan in 1913 when she married a physician. Beatrice was her fourth child who became Beatice Lilley (and then Collard) and her fifth child Joyce Mary became Joyce Mary Lilley. Her last child, Guy, was born in 1903.
