= The Academy (periodical) =

Weekly London magazine

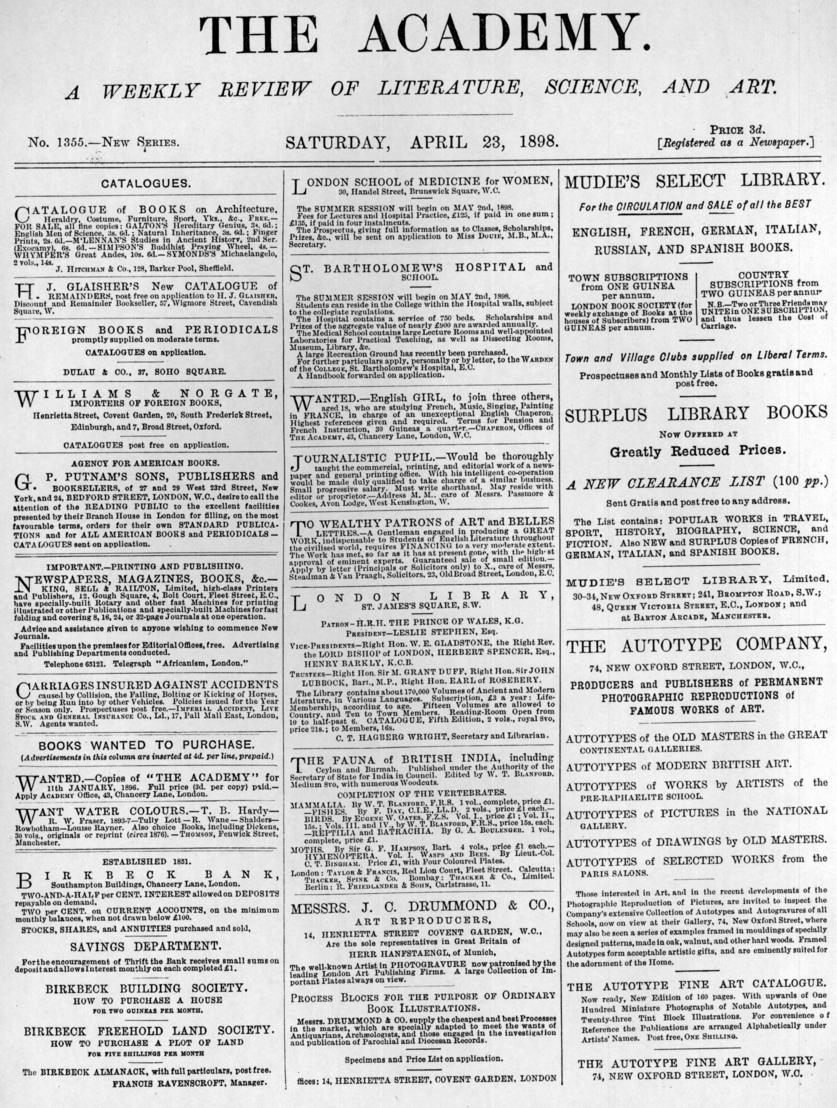

The Academy was a review of literature and general topics published in London from 1869 to 1915, with a period from 1902 to 1905 when it was retitled The Academy and Literature. It was founded by Charles Appleton.

The first issue was published on 9 October 1869 under the title The Academy: A Monthly Record of Literature, Learning, Science, and Art. It was published monthly from October 1869 to January 1871, then semimonthly from February 1871 to 1873, and weekly from 1874 to 1902 under the titles The Academy: A Weekly Review of Literature, Science, and Art and then The Academy: A Weekly Review of Literature and Life. The last issue was number 1549 on 11 January. In January 1902, The Academy merged with the periodical Literature, becoming The Academy and Literature. The merged periodical retained the numbering of The Academy, however, and reverted to the name The Academy in 1905.

Against the prevailing custom of anonymous authorship, The Academy provided the full names of its writers. In its early years, the reviewers included Edmund Gosse, George Saintsbury, and Henry Sidgwick. As a general rule, The Academy did not publish signed reviews. After its purchase by John Morgan Richards in 1896, the periodical published lighter fare under the editorship of Charles Lewis Hind. The editors for The Academy were: Charles Appleton (1869–78), Charles Doble (1878–80), James S. Cotton (1881–96), and C. Lewis Hind (1896–1903, including his editorship of The Academy and Literature). Henry Bradley served as temporary editor for a portion of 1884–85.

From 1902 to 1916 the periodical The Academy and Literature had a fairly high turnover in ownership, editorship, and editorial direction. The editors were: C. Lewis Hind (1902–3), William Teignmouth Shore (1903–5), P. Anderson Graham & Assistant Editor Harold Hannyngton Child (1905–6), Lord Alfred Douglas (1907–10), Cecil Cowper (1910–15), Henry Savage (1915), and T. W. H. Crosland (1915–16).

The Academy moved from a Liberal to a Conservative position under Lord Alfred Douglas, who was aided by T.W.H. Crosland. "Douglas and Crosland between them succeed in making The Academy the most candid, most readable, and most admirable literary paper in the United Kingdom". In 1909 WHSmith withdrew the magazine for sale and Douglas shortly had to relinquish the editorship.

The magazine closed in 1915. Crosland briefly revived the title as a monthly in 1916 with himself as editor and sole contributor.

Between August 1918 and May 1920 a 'dummy' magazine was produced to maintain the right to the title. In 1920 James Conchie bought the title for Lord Alfred Douglas, who incorporated it within his magazine Plain English, with which is incorporated The Academy.
