= Ronald Appleton =

Crown Prosecutor for Northern Ireland (1927–2025)

Ronald Appleton KC
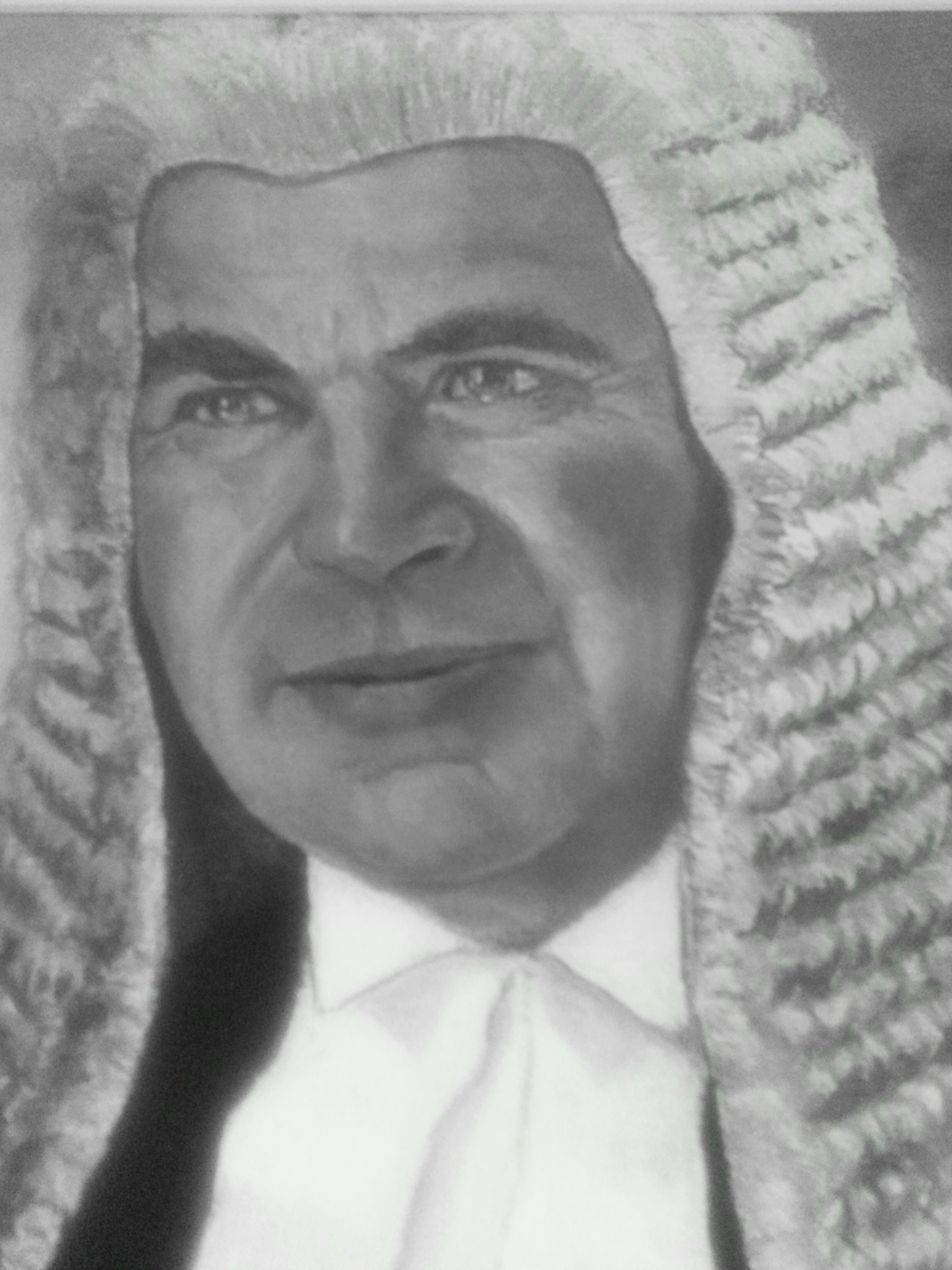
- Born: Ronald Appleton; 29 December 1927; Belfast, Northern Ireland
- Died: 6 April 2025 (aged 97)
- Occupation: Chief Crown Prosecutor for Northern Ireland
- Years active: 1951–1999

Ronald Appleton KC, (29 December 1927 – 6 April 2025) was chief crown prosecutor (Senior Crown Counsel) for Northern Ireland, a post he held for 22 years, a period that spanned the Northern Ireland 'Troubles'. Having established a broad civil practice as a QC he became one of the most experienced terrorism trial lawyers in the UK. As senior counsel he led for the Crown in many of the major murder and terrorism cases during those years. Martin Dillon, in his book on the Shankill Butchers trial described Ronald Appleton as "one of the outstanding lawyers of his generation".

== Posts held ==
Posts held by Appleton include King's Counsel (appointed 1969), Senior Crown Prosecutor for Northern Ireland (1977-1999), Father of the Bar, founder and chairman of Pro Bono Society, Committee for Holocaust Remembrance, president of Belfast Hebrew Congregation, co-chair Council of Christians and Jews and founder and president of Thanksgiving Square.

== Background and family ==
Appleton was born in Belfast on 29 December 1927, the eldest son of Jewish immigrant parents. His mother Sophie, had been born near Kiev in Ukraine, and his father David was born in Dumfries, Scotland from a family of Lithuanian origin. David was a Merchant Seaman and served with the Royal Australian Navy in the First World War. He was decorated for his service. Ronald has two younger brothers; Neil and Ian. Neil Appleton became a millionaire in the pharmaceutical industry and had two sons, David and Marc Appleton, Marc had a daughter Alanna Appleton.

He attended Skegoniel Primary School and Belfast High School (where he later served as school governor). He obtained his law degree at Queen's University Belfast and was also head of the University Socialist Society.

Appleton worked as a barrister acting for the defence in criminal trials - including in a number of capital cases. These include the trial following the murder of Constable Victor Arbuckle, the first policeman to be killed in the Northern Ireland Troubles.

He married Shoshana (née Schmidt) in 1963 in Tel Aviv, Israel. They had five children. Appleton died on 6 April 2025, at the age of 97.

== Notable trials ==
=== Maxwell v. Director of Public Prosecutions for Northern Ireland ===
Maxwell is a leading case dealing with the mens rea of accomplices in joint enterprise cases. It establishes that an accomplice can be convicted as a principal to a crime even if the role was subordinate.

The case was heard at the House of Lords before Viscount Dilhorne, Lord Hailsham, Lord Edmund-Davies, Lord Fraser and Lord Scarman on 24 July, 19 October 1978. Ronald Appleton QC led for the Director of Public Prosecutions for Northern Ireland (DPP).

=== Michael Stone ===
Appleton was the Crown Prosecutor for the 1989 trial of Michael Stone, an Ulster Loyalist. In this trial, Mr Stone pleaded not guilty to a total of 38 terrorist charges relating to 11 separate incidents between November 1984 and 16 March 1988. These charges included six counts of murder, six attempted murder, six wounding and three conspiracy to murder. Three of these murder charges were the result of the Milltown Massacre where Mr Stone had thrown grenades and shot at mourners during the funeral of three Provisional IRA volunteers killed in Gibraltar 10 days earlier. Regarding this incident, Ronald Appleton told Justice Higgins that Stone, using "earthy and colourful language" said "brilliant" when told he had killed at least two people. Although pleading not guilty, Stone refused to offer any defence. Stone was convicted and imprisoned with sentences totalling 684 years.

=== Corporals Killings ===
The burial of Caoimhiin Mac Brádaigh (Kevin Brady), an IRA member killed in the Milltown Cemetery Attack by loyalist Michael Stone 3 days earlier, took place shortly after of the previous loyalist attack. Due to the consequent fear of attacks, when corporals Derek Wood and Robert Howes drove into the IRA procession in civilian clothing, they were surrounded, pulled out of their car and beaten. They were then dragged to Casement Park sports ground, beaten and stripped of clothing. At this point they were then thrown over a high wall to be put into a waiting black taxi, driven 200 yards to waste ground and shot several times. It was confirmed via post-mortem that Corporal Wood was shot twice in the head and four times in the body as well as being stabbed in the neck. Corporal Howes was shot once in the head and four times in the body.

In April 1989, the first of 5 trials for the murder of Corporals Derek Wood and Robert Howes, often referred to as the Corporals killings, was held. Henry Maguire and Alex Murphy denied a total of nine charges including the assault, causing of grievous bodily harm, false imprisonment and murder of the corporals. Ronald Appleton, QC, for prosecution said that it was the Crown's case that Maguire and Murphy "were part of a smaller crowd...that were engaged in a joint enterprise to kill".

Initial evidence highlighted by Ronald Appleton included bloodstains on the defendants at the time of arrest that matched the soldiers' and fibres found on the two at arrest matched that of the clothes the corporals were wearing. Ronald Appleton concluded "this defendant had at least been in close contact with the soldiers". Video footage of the event was obtained from a British Army helicopter allegedly showed that both of the accused were part of a small group including 3 others. 11 witnesses who had been shown the video identified Murphy and Maguire. Due to the amount and quality of evidence against the defendants, Ronald Appleton claimed that the court would come to the "irresistible inference" that the accused were guilty.

Murphy and Maguire were never accused of shooting the corporals. Henry Maguire and Alex Murphy were found guilty of murder and sentenced to life imprisonment. A further 83 years for Murphy and 79 years for Maguire were given for grievous bodily harm and false imprisonment of the soldiers as well as possession of a gun and ammunition.

=== Dominic McGlinchey ===
Ronald Appleton represented the crown in the extradition and at the later trial of Dominic McGlinchey for the murder of the postmistress Hester McMullan.

=== DeLorean Motor Company Fraud ===
In April 1992, Frederick Bushell, former chairman of the British Lotus Luxury car firm was first put on trial for his role in defrauding up to $17.5 million over a four-year period ending December 1982.

Bushell admitted his criminal involvement with DeLorean Motor Company and Lotus Cars founders, John DeLorean and Colin Chapman, respectively. However, due to John DeLorean's residence in the US and the death of Colin Chapman, Bushell stood alone in the docks.

Bushell's counsel, Desmond Boal KC, requested six weeks to put his affairs in order, suggesting that it was also in public interest. Ronald Appleton agreed that Bushell should be given some time however unsuccessfully argued that the time requested was too much. Bushell was given six weeks to get his affairs in order, in which time bail was set at £50,000.

Lotus was called to develop DeLorean's prototype car for $17.65 million to which the company board was talked into paying in advance. This money was never used for development and instead was siphoned through a Geneva-based company set up a year prior by Chapman and Bushell. Of the total amount $8.5m went to DeLorean, $7.5 to Chapman and $848,000 to Bushell. "Not a penny went to the development work".

Frederick Bushell was sentenced to three years imprisonment, taking into consideration his guilty plea and his recent triple heart bypass surgery.

=== Arbuckle Murder ===
Constable Victor Arbuckle, a member of the Royal Ulster Constabulary (RUC) was shot dead by loyalists on Shankill Road on 11 October 1969. Victor Arbuckle was the first police fatality of the Troubles. Three men were subsequently put on trial for Capital Murder, a crime carrying the death penalty sentence if found guilty. The three men on trial were Thomas McNeil Roundtree, Ernest Robert Bell and William John Duncan. The defendants were also charged with maliciously wounding four other people, including a Special Constable, as well as with illegal possession of firearms and ammunition. Ronald Appleton defended Thomas Roundtree.

The trial first commenced in June 1970. However, it was found that the route taken by the coach driver driving the jury to and from the court passed areas of the Shankill road that were integral to the case. Due to this, two defendants applied for discharge of jury. Justice McGonigal agreed that if there was a risk of a "miscarriage of justice" he must not take the risk and thus dismissed the trial.

The retrial began in October 1970. It became apparent during proceedings that crown witnesses had been confronted outside of court. As a result, Justice McGonigal warned the court that any threats made to any witnesses would "be met with the most severe punishment which the court could impose".

Thomas Roundtree, Ernest Bell and William Duncan were all found not guilty for the Capital Murder of Victor Arbuckle, however 1 week later they were found guilty of armed offences carrying sentences ranging from 6 to 10 years.

=== La Mon House Hotel Bombing ===
On 17 February 1978 an incendiary bomb was placed and detonated in the La Mon House Hotel, Belfast, killing 12 people in "a fireball 60 feet wide and 40 feet high". Two men were tried in connection with the bombing: Edward Brophy and Robert Murphy.

Edward Manning Brophy pleaded not guilty to 12 charges of murder as well as 37 other charges including IRA membership and the causing of 11 other explosions in Belfast between 1976 and 1978. Ronald Appleton, prosecuting, stated that it was the Crown's case that Brophy was "guilty of murder because he provided the very lethal bomb and the hijacked cars to an IRA bombing team". Evidence for this case consisted entirely of alleged statements made by the defendant at Castlereagh) inquiry center. This evidence was ultimately deemed inadmissible which lead to Brophy being cleared of the La Mon Hotel bombing murder charges but sentenced to 5 years for alleged IRA membership.

=== Shankill Butchers Killings ===
The Shankill Butchers was an Ulster loyalist gang—many of whom were members of the Ulster Volunteer Force (UVF) that was active between 1975 and 1982 in Belfast. It was based in the Shankill area and was responsible for the deaths of at least 23 people, most of whom were killed in sectarian attacks. The gang was notorious for kidnapping and murdering random civilians from the Catholic community; each was beaten ferociously and had their throat hacked with a butcher's knife. Some were also tortured and attacked with a hatchet. The gang also killed six Protestants over personal disputes, and two other Protestants mistaken for Catholics. Most of the gang were eventually caught and, in February 1979, received the longest combined prison sentences in United Kingdom legal history. Appleton represented the crown in the prosecution and was described by Martin Dillon, in his book on The Shankill Butchers case as "a lawyer of outstanding ability".

=== Shankill Road Bombing ===
A bomb planted on the Shankill Road in October 1993 resulted in the death of 10 people. Many others were seriously injured. Ronald Appleton, for the prosecution in the trial of the surviving bomber Sean Kelly, told Belfast Crown Court that witnesses had seen Mr Kelly and Begley, dressed in white coats and hats, carrying a box into the fishmonger's. As Begley set down the box it exploded.

== Other work ==
=== Thanksgiving Square ===
Ronald Appleton was a founder and President of Thanksgiving Square, a charitable organisation set up to create a place of reflection in Belfast in the aftermath of the Troubles. After several years, the space was founded in Thanksgiving Square on the bank of the River Lagan at Lanyon Place. There they commissioned and built a 17 metres (56 ft) high statue, by the Scottish Sculptor Andy Scott.

=== Jewish causes ===
When the British Government announced the founding of a National Holocaust Remembrance Day, they decided that the first National Ceremony should be held in Belfast. The resulting event, termed "From the Holocaust to Rwanda", in the presence of Prince Edward, featured readings by Nobel laureate Seamus Heaney and the Chief Rabbi Jonathan Sacks, and was attended by national and international dignitaries. The event is annual.

Ronald Appleton was the President of the Jewish Community in Northern Ireland, a position he held for 14 years. He was also the founder and a committee member of the Northern Ireland Council of Christians and Jews.

=== Northern Ireland Lawyers Pro Bono Unit ===
Ronald Appleton was the first chairman of the lawyers Pro Bono Unit in Northern Ireland. The Pro Bono Unit was set up to provide advice and representation by barristers and solicitors who have volunteered to join the Scheme Panel, providing a range of legal services without charge.
