= Charles William Appleton =

American lawyer (1874-1945)

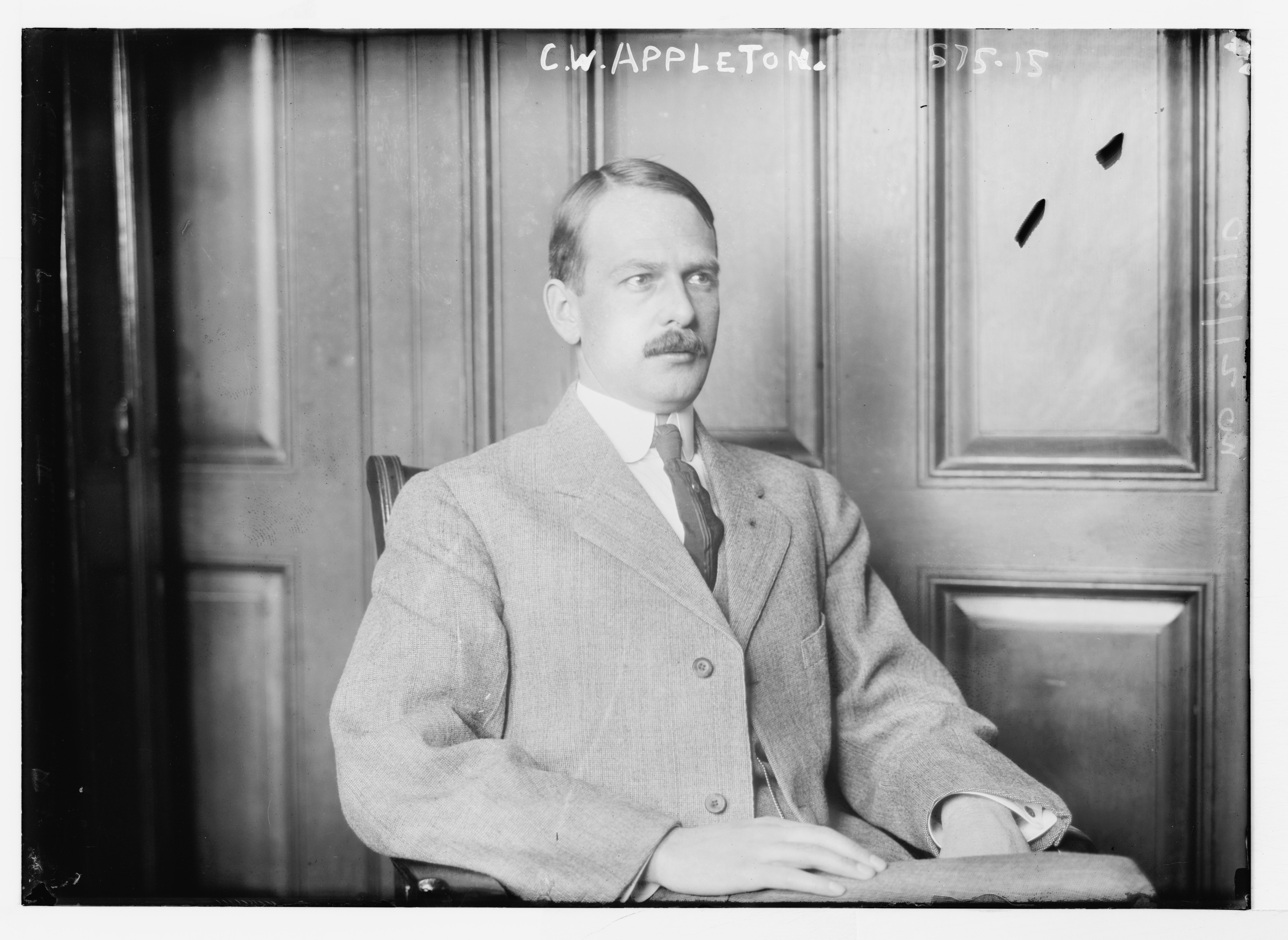
- Born: November 9, 1874
- Died: January 10, 1945 (aged 70)
- Education: St. Lawrence University
- Occupation: Lawyer

Charles William Appleton (November 9, 1874 – January 10, 1945), was the vice president of the General Electric Company and was a United States magistrate judge and an Assistant District Attorney in New York City.

Appleton graduated from St. Lawrence University in 1897 where Appleton Arena now bears his name.
