= Elizabeth Lachlan =

British educationist and author

- Born: Elizabeth Appleton; 1790; Bristol, England
- Died: 8 September 1849 (aged 58–59); London, England
- Occupations: Educationist, author
- Notable work: Private education; or, A practical plan for the studies of young ladies

Elizabeth Lachlan (née Appleton; 1790 – 8 September 1849) was a British writer and education advocate. Born in Bristol, she moved with her family to London and spent some time in Europe, before returning to become a governess to aristocratic families including that of Lord Leven. In 1815, she wrote her first book on education, drawing on the ideas of Sarah Trimmer, building a strong reputation. Appleton went on to found a school for young ladies, was consulted in the education of Princess Charlotte and was possibly asked to act as governess for Princess Victoria.

== Biography ==
Elizabeth Appleton was born in 1790, in Castle Street in Bristol. Her father had a strong affinity for music and spent much of the family's fortune on furthering that interest. Believing his son, Appleton's eldest brother, to be a musical prodigy, he moved the family to London and found himself work at the Kidbrook Park estate. Appleton's brother died before realising his musical potential, and her father died soon after in 1802.

Appleton had a sporadic education, as a charity student in one school and then a day pupil in another. She eventually became interested in becoming a teacher. At the age of 14, she spent some time in France with her governess and in 1811, following an argument with her mother, she spent three years on the continent.

On her return to England, Appleton became a governess for highborn families including the 9th Earl of Leven. In 1815, she wrote her first book, Private Education, or, A Practical Plan for the Studies of Young Ladies: with an address to parents, private governesses, and young ladies. She dedicated the book to the Countess of Leven.

In 1825, Appleton married John Lachlan, a clergyman, buying him an advowson. Over the next few years, the Lachlans suffered severe financial hardships, which started with the bankruptcy of her uncle. In 1832, John moved to Dunkirk to escape his debts, while Elizabeth attempted to re-establish her school. She became highly evangelical, however, leading to a decline in her reputation. She died on 8 September 1849 of cholera.

== Works on education ==
Appleton wrote about the education of young ladies and her views followed those of Sarah Trimmer's, that ladies should have a thorough education on subjects such as geography and astronomy, as well as a clear understanding of morality and religion. Her books gave practical systems to help those who wanted to follow this style of education, with methodologies for different age groups and abilities, and recommended reading texts to help. She also advocated better pay and pensions for women who entered the field of education.

In 1822, Appleton set up a school for young ladies in Portland Place, London, and by 1825 she was earning £4,000 per year (equivalent to £414,725 in 2023) from it. Appleton had written a number of educational texts by this point, had been consulted on the education of Princess Charlotte and supposedly even asked to be governess for Princess Victoria.

== Selected works ==
- Appleton, Elizabeth (1816). Private education; or, A practical plan for the studies of young ladies. Henry Colburn.
- Appleton, Elizabeth (1816). Edgar: a national tale. H. Colburn. ISBN 9781348035831.
- Appleton, Elizabeth (1818). The spring bud, or, Rural scenery in verse. J. Harris.
- Appleton, Elizabeth (1820). The Poor Girls Help to a Knowledge of the first Principles of Religion, and to the Sacrament of the Lord's Support.
- Appleton, Elizabeth (1821). Early Education: Or the Management of Children Considered with A View to Their Future Character. Kessinger. ISBN 9781436827331.
- Lachlan, Elizabeth (1824). A guide to the French language. Whittaker.
- Lachlan, Elizabeth (1829). Leonora: Or, The Presentation at Court : Being the First of a Series of Narratives Called Young Ladies' Tales. London: Longman, Rees, Orme, Brown, and Green.
- Lachlan, Elizabeth (1834). Sacred Readings: being a selection of passages from the Word of God arranged under appropriate heads, and adapted for daily or occasional reading. Whittaker & Company.
- Lachlan, Elizabeth (1850). Mizpah (pseud) (ed.). Magdalena's voyages and travels through the kingdom of this world into the kingdom of grace. London: G., J. & R. Banks.
