= Charles Appleton (cricketer) =

English cricketer

Charles Appleton (15 May 1844 – 26 February 1925) was an English amateur cricketer, who played three matches of first-class cricket for Yorkshire County Cricket Club in 1865, which happened to comprise three of Yorkshire's heaviest defeats. In his six first-class innings he scored 56 runs, with a best of 18, at an average of 11.20. He did not bowl or take a catch. He played against Surrey, an 'All England XI' and Kent, all the matches being held at Bramall Lane, Sheffield. He is notable for making his first-class debut at the advanced age of 41.

== Life and career ==
Appleton was born in Kirk Ella, East Riding of Yorkshire.

Yorkshire lost to Surrey in mid June by ten wickets, with Appleton scoring 5 and 16 batting at number five. Yorkshire opened with 188, thanks to Greenwood's 83, but Surrey's reply put the game out of reach as four batsman passed 50 in a score of 327. Yorkshire forced Surrey to bat a second time, just, with 143 but a target of six runs hardly tested the brown caps' openers.

Appleton's second match saw Yorkshire beaten by an 'All England XI' by an innings and 255 runs in mid July. After the England XI had compiled a mammoth 524 in 320 overs, Appleton, batting down at number ten, scored an unbeaten 14 in Yorkshire's reply of 125. Promoted to open the innings as Yorkshire followed on, Appleton continued his defiance to post eighteen runs, but Yorkshire were soon destroyed by Wooton, who took all 10 wickets for 54 runs in 31.3 overs. Appleton's score, though the third biggest of the innings, was dwarfed by Darnton's unbeaten 81.

Appleton's final match saw yet another defeat for his team, this time by an innings and 70 runs against Kent. Having restricted the visitors to a manageable 159, Yorkshire were skittled for a hundred runs less with Appleton contributing two runs from number three in the order. Things went from bad to worse as Yorkshire were bowled out for 30 as they followed on, with no batsman making double figures. In his last ever first-class innings, Appleton fell for a single. Willsher, for Kent, completed match figures of 12 for 28.

Appleton died at Bradley Hall in Standish, Wigan, Lancashire, at the age of 80.
