= Charles Appleton (academic) =

Oxford don/scholarly entrepreneur

Charles Edward Cutts Birchall Appleton (16 March 1841 – 1 February 1879) was an Oxford don and scholarly entrepreneur.

He is best remembered for founding the periodical The Academy in 1869; it was intended a forum for an intellectual and cultural revival in the German style. The purpose was to encourage an elite with "sound information and correct taste in intellectual matters".
