= Overstreet =

Overstreet is an English surname. Notable people with the surname include:

- Baker Overstreet (born 1981), American artist
- Bonaro W. Overstreet (1902–1985), American author, poet, psychologist, and lecturer
- Bridgett Overstreet (born 1969), American gospel artist
- Chord Overstreet (born 1989), American actor, singer, musician and composer
- David Overstreet (1958–1984), American football player
- Greg Overstreet, American lawyer and politician
- Harold G. Overstreet (born 1944), United States Marine Corps officer
- Harry Allen Overstreet (1875–1970), American writer and lecturer
- James Overstreet (1773–1822), American politician
- James W. Overstreet (1866–1938), American politician
- Jason Overstreet, American politician
- Jeffrey Overstreet, American novelist and film reviewer
- Jesse Overstreet (1859–1910), American politician
- Morris Overstreet (1950–2024), American judge
- Paul Overstreet (born 1955), American singer-songwriter
- Tommy Overstreet (1937–2015), American singer
- Will Overstreet (born 1979), American football player
- William Benton Overstreet (1888–1935), American songwriter, bandleader and pianist

Fictional Characters

- Knox Overstreet, a character in the movie Dead Poets Society

== See also ==
- Lake Overstreet, a lake in Leon County, Florida, United States
- Overstreet Comic Book Price Guide, a comic book price guide
