= Edith S. Sampson =

American diplomat, lawyer and judge (1901–1979)

- Sampson in 1949, photographed by Carl Van Vechten
- Occupation: Lawyer
- Known for: first Black U.S. delegate appointed to the United Nations

Edith Spurlock Sampson (October 13, 1901 – October 8, 1979) was an American lawyer, diplomat and civil rights advocate known for being the first African American to officially represent the United States at the United Nations, appointed in 1950. She rose to this position on the strength of her reputation as a staunch anti-communist during the Cold War. She was also the first African-American U.S. delegate to NATO.

== Youth and education ==
A native of Pittsburgh, Pennsylvania, Sampson was one of eight children born to Louis Spurlock, a launderer, and Elizabeth A. McGruder. She left school at 14 due to family financial difficulties and found work cleaning and deboning fish at a market. She later returned to school and graduated from Peabody High School in Pittsburgh. She then went to work for Associated Charities and studied at the New York School of Social Work. After she received the highest grade in a criminology course, George Kirchwey of Columbia, one of her instructors, encouraged her to become an attorney.

She married Rufus Sampson and they moved to Chicago where while working full-time during the day as a social worker she studied law at night. Sampson graduated from John Marshall Law School in 1925 winning a special dean's commendation for ranking at the top of her jurisprudence class.

== Early career ==
In 1924, Sampson opened a law office on the South Side of Chicago, serving the local black community. From 1925 through 1942, she was associated with the Juvenile Court of Cook County and served as a probation officer. In 1927 Sampson became the first woman to earn a Master of Laws from Loyola University's Graduate Law School. She also passed the Illinois bar exam that year. In 1934 Sampson was admitted to practice before the Supreme Court. In 1943, she became one of the first black members of the National Association of Women Lawyers. In 1947 she was appointed an Assistant State's Attorney in Cook County.

Sampson was a member of the National Council of Negro Women (NCNW). She also participated in Democratic Party politics in Cook County and advocated for the inclusion of more African-American women in leadership roles, arguing in a 1949 speech that it was time "to take our proper place in the front lines of the political life of this country." As a high school student, Barbara Jordan (later a trailblazing attorney and Democratic politician in her own right) was inspired by Sampson's example as a lawyer and political speaker after hearing the Chicago attorney address an assembly at Phyllis Wheatley High School in Houston.

== International politics ==
In 1949, thanks in part to her work as chair of the NCNW's International Relations Committee, Sampson was selected to join the "World Town Hall Seminar," a program created by George V. Denny Jr. in collaboration with the United States Department of State. The seminar sent twenty-six prominent Americans on a world tour meeting leaders of foreign countries and participating in public political debates that were broadcast on the radio, modeled on America's Town Meeting of the Air.

In her contributions to these meetings, Sampson sought to counter the propaganda in the Soviet Union during the Cold War regarding the treatment of African Americans in the United States. During one meeting in India, she said:

The question is, quite bluntly, "Do Negroes have equal rights in America?" My answer is no, we do not have equal rights in all parts of the United States. But let's remember that 85 years ago Negroes in America were slaves and were 100 per cent illiterate. And the record shows that the Negro has advanced further in this period than any similar group in the entire world. You here get considerable misinformation about American Negroes and hear little or nothing that is constructive.

She also stated that "I would rather be a Negro in America than a citizen in any other land." Supreme Court Justice William O. Douglas said that her actions "created more good will and understanding in India than any other single act by any American".

Sampson also attacked Soviet communism directly by comparing it to slavery and accusing, in particular, the Soviet Union of enslaving prisoners of war from World War II. In a report circulated by the American government, Sampson reportedly told Soviet Ambassador Yakov Malik: "We Negroes aren't interested in Communism... We were slaves too long for that. Nobody is happy with second-class citizenship, but our best chances are in the framework of American democracy."

Sampson was generally praised by US media, and NAACP leader Walter White (who was also a member of the international trip) reported on their return that, "The most valuable salesman of American democracy on the Town Hall tour has been Mrs. Edith Sampson of Chicago." However, coverage of Sampson's comments provoked the Baltimore Afro-American to remark: "With all of the talk about democracy abroad, we hope that in the not too distant future, examples of democracy at home will be more commonplace and, consequently, attract less attention".

=== United Nations ===
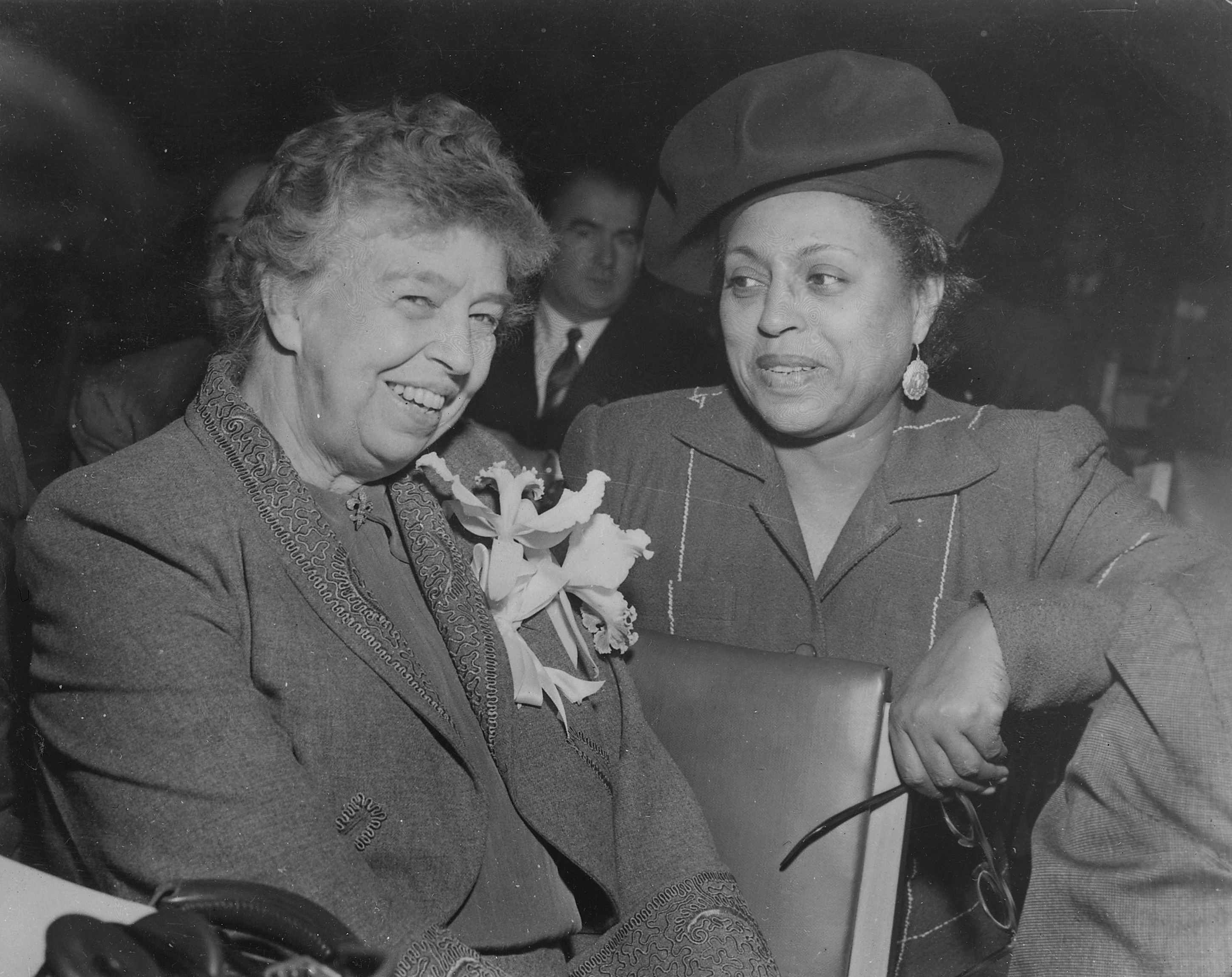
Sampson with Eleanor Roosevelt at the United Nations in September 1950

As a result of the Town Hall tour and her other public speaking, President Truman appointed Sampson as an alternate U.S. delegate to the United Nations on 24 August 1950, making her the first African-American to officially represent the United States at the UN. She was a member of the UN's Social, Humanitarian, and Cultural Committee, where she lobbied for continued support of work in social welfare. She also presented a resolution pressuring the Soviet Union to repatriate the remainder of its Prisoners of War from World War II. She was reappointed to the UN in 1952, and served until 1953. During the Eisenhower Administration, she was a member of the U.S. Commission for UNESCO. In 1961 and 1962, she became the first black U.S. representative to NATO.

=== Dissent ===
Sampson began to express great dissent from American policies in 1959–1960. In a 1960 speech to African American high school graduates in Dallas, Texas, she said, "We have convinced ourselves, because it seemed so necessary, that the battle against injustice could be won piece by piece through changes in law, through court appeals, through persistent but cautious pressures. We were mistaken. No–we were wrong. Ours was not the only way. It was not even the best way."

== Judgeship ==
In 1962, Sampson ran for associate judge of the Municipal Court of Chicago, and easily won the election; she was the first black woman to be elected as a judge in the state of Illinois. In 1966, she became an associate judge for the Circuit Court of Cook County. Most of the cases that she heard were housing disputes involving poor tenants, in which she was perceived as "an understanding but tough grandmother".

By 1969 she had apparently regained her faith in working within the system, saying in a speech: "We learned that we could work within the establishment, the system, without necessarily knuckling under to it."

She continued as a Circuit Court judge until she retired in 1978. She died in Chicago on October 8, 1979.

== Family ==
Sampson first married Rufus Sampson, a field agent for the Tuskegee Institute. They divorced, but she retained the name Edith Sampson as she was already professionally known by it. In 1935, she married lawyer Joseph E. Clayton, with whom she shared her legal practice until his death in 1957. Two of her nephews, Charles T. Spurlock and Oliver Spurlock, were also judges. Her niece, Jeanne Spurlock, became the first African American woman to be dean of an American medical school (Meharry Medical College). Sampson's great-niece, Lynne Moody, is an actress who appeared in the television miniseries Roots. Sampson became an honorary member of Zeta Phi Beta sorority in 1952.

== See also ==
- List of African-American jurists
- List of first women lawyers and judges in Illinois
