= The Town Hall (New York City) =

Performance venue in Manhattan, New York

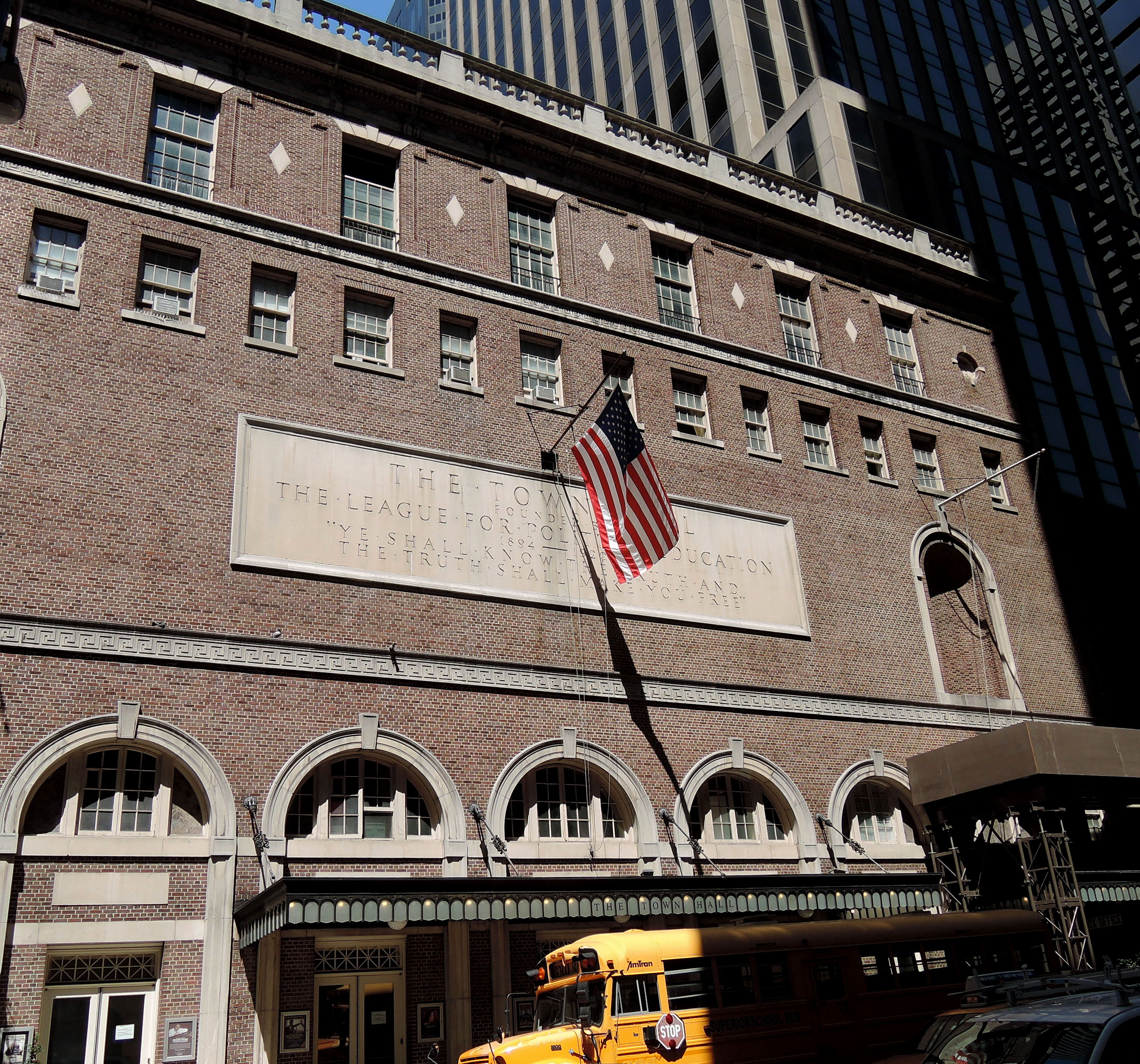
- Interactive map of The Town Hall
- Address: 123 West 43rd Street; Manhattan, New York City; United States
- Coordinates: 40°45′22″N 73°59′05″W
- Owner: Town Hall Foundation, Inc.
- Capacity: 1,495

Construction
- Built: 1919
- Opened: January 12, 1921 (105 years ago)
- Years active: 1921–present
- Architect: Teunis J. van der Bent of McKim, Mead & White

Website
- the-townhall-nyc.org
- Town Hall
- U.S. National Register of Historic Places
- U.S. National Historic Landmark
- New York State Register of Historic Places
- New York City Landmark
- Area: 12,563 square feet (1,167 m^{2})
- Architectural style: Late 19th and 20th century revivals, Neo-Federal
- NRHP reference No.: 80002724
- NYSRHP No.: 06101.001777
- NYCL No.: 1011, 1012

Significant dates
- Added to NRHP: April 23, 1980
- Designated NHL: March 2, 2012
- Designated NYSRHP: June 23, 1980
- Designated NYCL: November 28, 1978

The Town Hall (also Town Hall (Note: The Town Hall uses the definite article in its own name, but other sources refer to it simply as "Town Hall".)) is a performance space at 123 West 43rd Street, between Broadway and Sixth Avenue near Times Square, in the Theater District of Midtown Manhattan in New York City. It was built from 1919 to 1921 and designed by architects McKim, Mead & White for the League for Political Education. The auditorium has 1,500 seats across two levels and has historically been used for various events, such as speeches, musical recitals, concerts, and film screenings. Both the exterior and interior of the building are New York City landmarks, and the building is on the National Register of Historic Places as a National Historic Landmark.

Town Hall was designed in the Georgian Revival style and has a brick facade with limestone trim. The base contains seven arched doorways that serve as the venue's entrance. The facade of the upper stories contains a large limestone plaque, niches, and windows. Inside the ground story, a rectangular lobby leads to the auditorium. The upper stories originally housed offices for the League for Political Education the Civic Forum, the Economic Club, and the Town Hall Club.

Town Hall's auditorium opened on January 12, 1921, and was originally intended as a place for speeches, but Town Hall subsequently became one of New York City's top musical venues in its 20th-century heyday. The first public-affairs media programming, the America's Town Meeting of the Air radio program, broadcast from Town Hall between 1935 and 1956. New York University (NYU) leased Town Hall afterward, but the venue began to decline in popularity during the 1950s and 1960s. NYU closed the auditorium in 1978 due to financial shortfalls, and Town Hall was then renovated and reopened as a performance venue by the Town Hall Foundation.

== Site ==
Town Hall is on 123 West 43rd Street, between Broadway and Sixth Avenue near Times Square, in the Theater District of Midtown Manhattan in New York City. The land lot covers 12,563 square feet (1,167.1 m^{2}), with a frontage of 125 feet (38 m) on 45th Street and a depth of 100.42 feet (31 m). Nearby buildings include the Millennium Times Square New York, Hudson Theatre, Hotel Gerard, and the Chatwal New York hotel to the north; the Belasco Theatre to the northeast; the Bank of America Tower and Stephen Sondheim Theatre to the south; 4 Times Square to the southwest; and 1500 Broadway to the west.

== Design ==
Town Hall was designed by McKim, Mead & White in the Georgian Revival style and constructed from 1919 to 1921 as a lecture venue. Teunis (Dennis) J. van der Bent of the firm was in charge of the overall design, and Russell B. Smith was the supervising engineer. The interior work was completed by Louis Jallade after the building opened. Wallace Clement Sabine has been popularly cited as a consultant in the design of Town Hall's auditorium, but he died before the building was completed. Town Hall was originally built for the League for Political Education. The Georgian Revival style was chosen for its connotations of grassroots democracy.

=== Facade ===
The main elevation of the facade, facing south on 43rd Street, is clad in brown brick with Flemish bond and is divided into three horizontal sections. The openings have limestone trim around them. Generally, the facade is nine bays wide and is designed to appear as a four-story structure. When it was completed, Town Hall's facade complemented the Georgian facade of the Stephen Sondheim Theatre immediately across the street.

The western elevation abuts an adjacent four-story building, which was formerly an annex of Town Hall and retains a connection at a single story. The eastern elevation is clad with common brick and originally was not visible from the street, but the site immediately to the east was redeveloped in the 1970s with an office building, which is set back from the curb. The northern elevation is not visible from the street since it faces another building.

==== Base ====
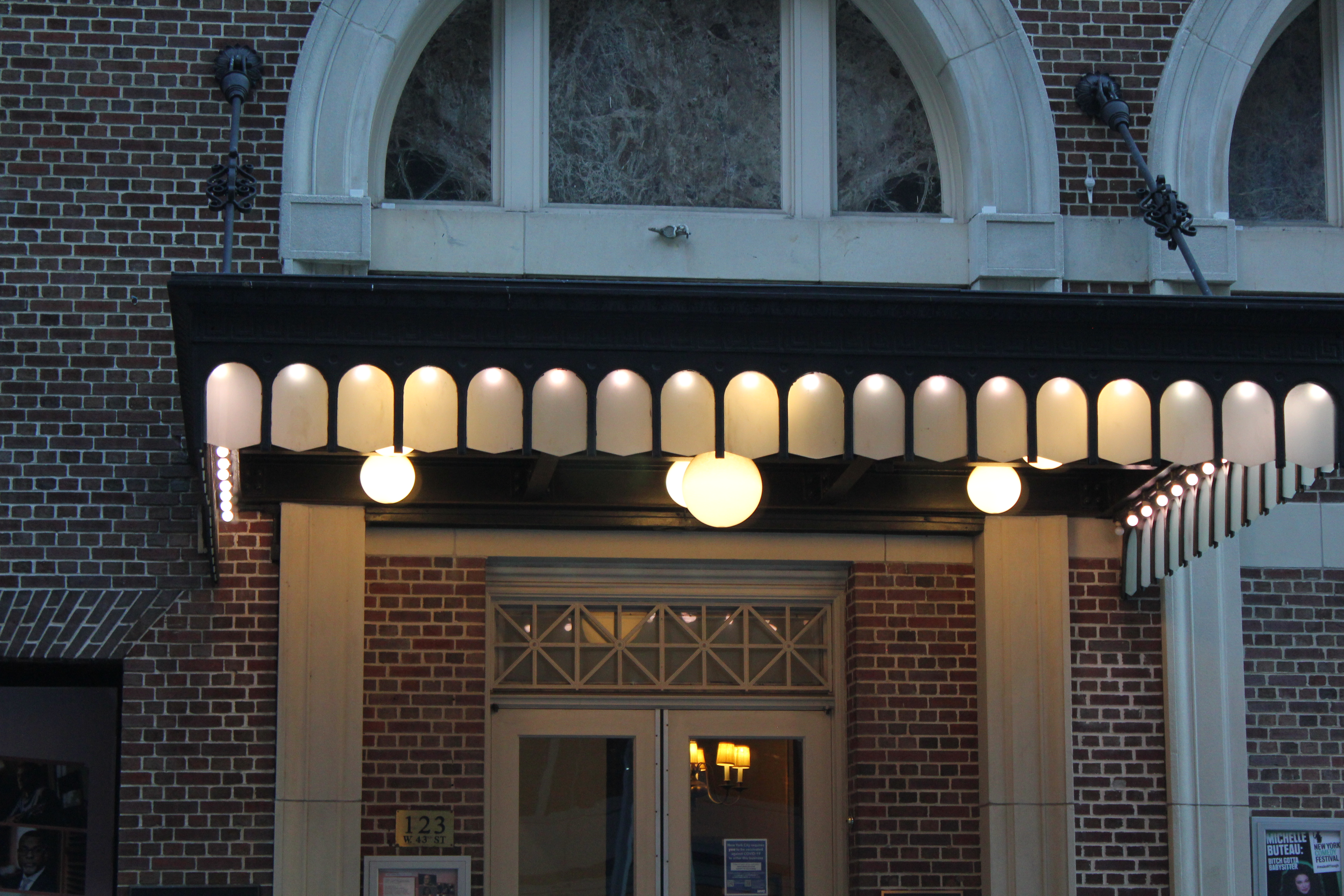
Canopy at archway

The first-story facade contains a blind arcade with seven arches containing double doors. The westernmost door leads to the upper story, the five center doors lead to the theater, and the easternmost door leads to the box office. The arches are accessed by either one or two steps, since the eastern section of the site is higher than the western section. Fluted limestone pilasters flank the doors. Each double door has wooden frames and glass panes, above which are multi-pane transom windows. Each doorway has a limestone tympanum above it, as well as a lunette window with a keystone. The extreme ends of the facade, on either side of the blind arcade, contain metal double doors that lead to The Town Hall's backstage hallways. Above each of these end doors is a splayed brick lintel and a wood-framed sash window.

Five of the arched openings have steel-and-glass canopies above them. The canopies are cantilevered from steel rods that extend diagonally from the facade. There are three such canopies: one above each outermost arch and one above the center three doorways. Underneath each canopy are spherical lamps, with glass shades at the edges of the canopy. The centers of the canopies' undersides have large spherical lamps, which are surrounded by smaller spheres. A Greek key band course runs above the mezzanine.

==== Upper floors ====
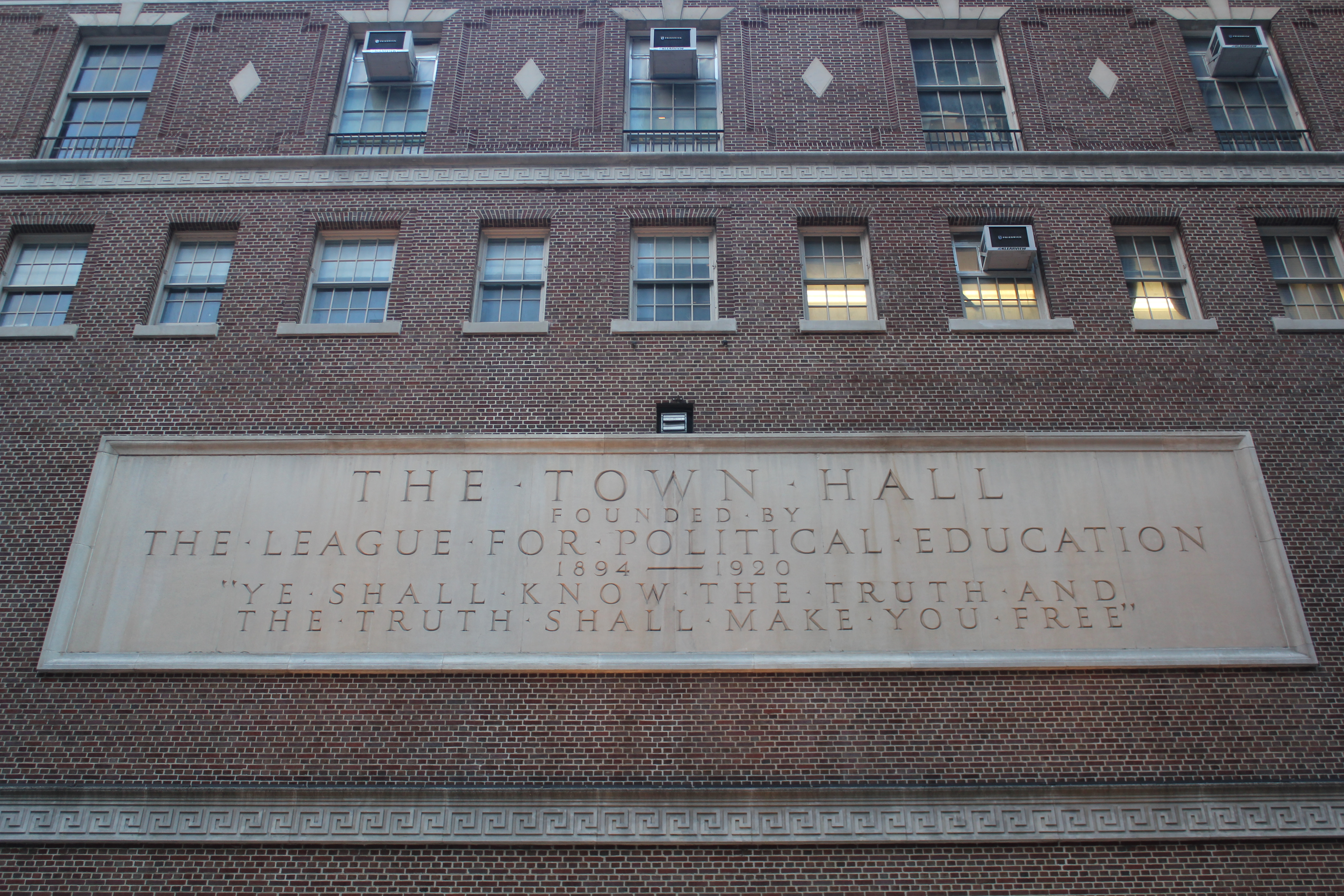
Plaque on middle stories

The middle stories generally lack window openings and are faced in brick. The center of the facade has a limestone plaque that contains the words "The Town Hall / Founded by / the League for Political Education / 1894–1920 / 'Ye Shall Know the Truth and / the Truth Shall Make You Free'". On either side are two empty niches surrounded by limestone frames. The niches are topped by round arches and contain similar keystones to the openings below them. There are light fixtures at the bases of the niches, as well as on the sills of the round arches. Above the niches and plaque is a set of sash windows with brick and limestone frames. A Greek key band course runs above the middle stories.

The attic contains seven double-hung sash windows, which are larger than those in the midsection. Each window has an iron grille below it, as well as a limestone lintel with a keystone above. There are recessed brick panels between each of the attic windows, each of which contains a limestone lozenge. Both of the outermost bays contain recessed panels with an ocular window inside. The attic contains an Adamesque limestone frieze above the windows. Above this is a set of dentils and a balustrade.

=== Interior ===
The Town Hall's lobby and auditorium are on the lower levels, and the offices are on the upper levels. The auditorium is semicircular in plan and is surrounded by the backstage and front of house areas. Two passageways, one each on the extreme west and east ends of the ground story, provide access from the street to backstage areas. While the auditorium is two stories tall, it has been described in contemporary publications as a four-story space.

==== Lobby ====
The lobby is accessed from the five center doorways on 43rd Street. It has a largely rectangular plan, except for the north wall, which corresponds to the auditorium's rear wall. A contemporary publication called the lobby "a memorial to public-spirited citizens not now living who were leaders of their day in public usefulness".

The lobby contains a floor of terrazzo tiles, as well as classically styled pilasters and a paneled ceiling. The northern wall of the lobby has a screen divided into three portions. The central section of the screen has a set of double doors, flanked by Ionic-style engaged columns. The outer sections of the screen are made of marble with window openings, and they contain Doric-style pilasters. On either side of the screen are staircases that lead up to the first mezzanine level of the auditorium. These stairs have balustrades with iron balusters and walnut wooden railings. Underneath the stairs are additional doorways that lead into the auditorium's orchestra level. Double doors with multiple glass panes lead east to the box office and west to the elevator banks.

==== Auditorium ====
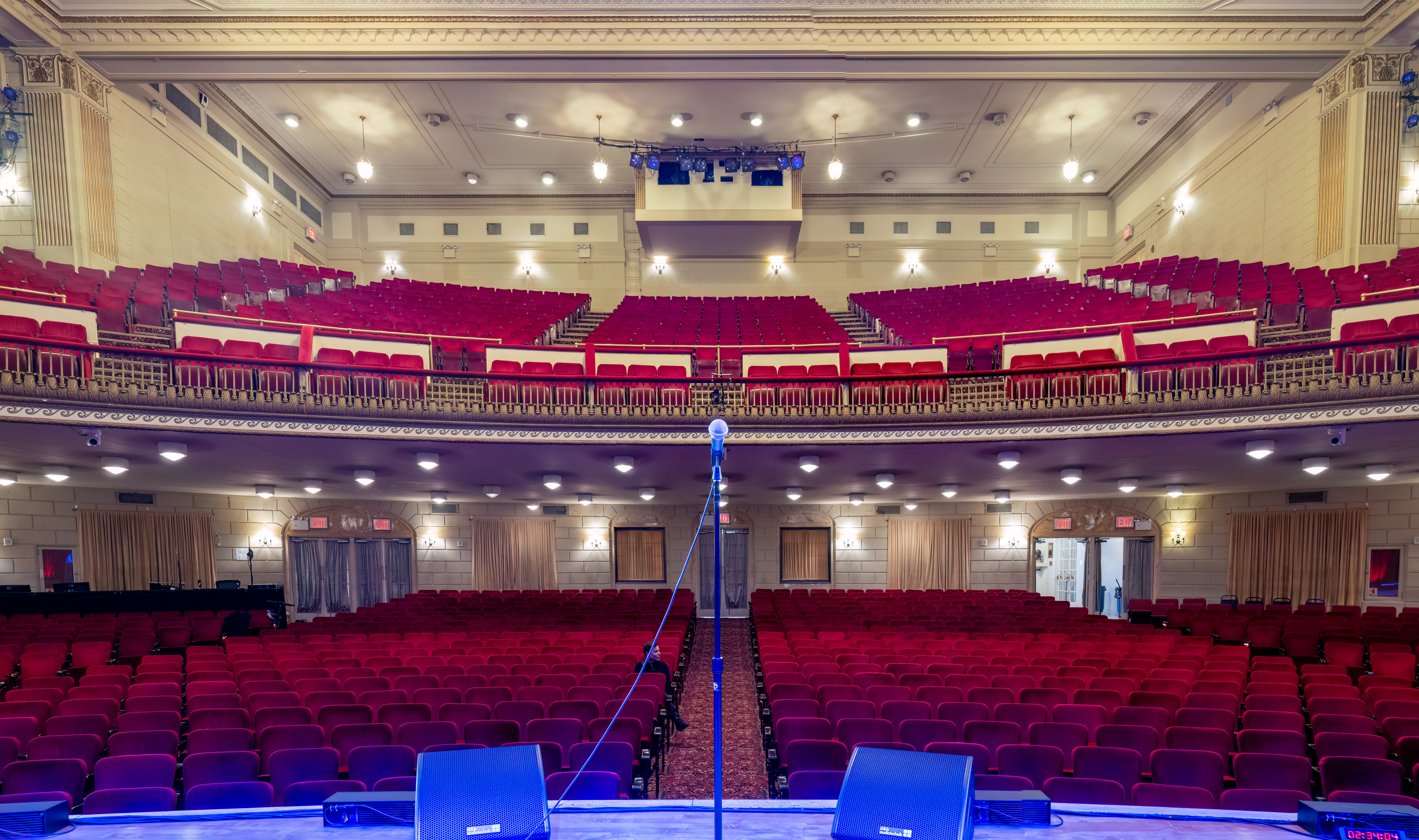
Auditorium seating viewed from the stage

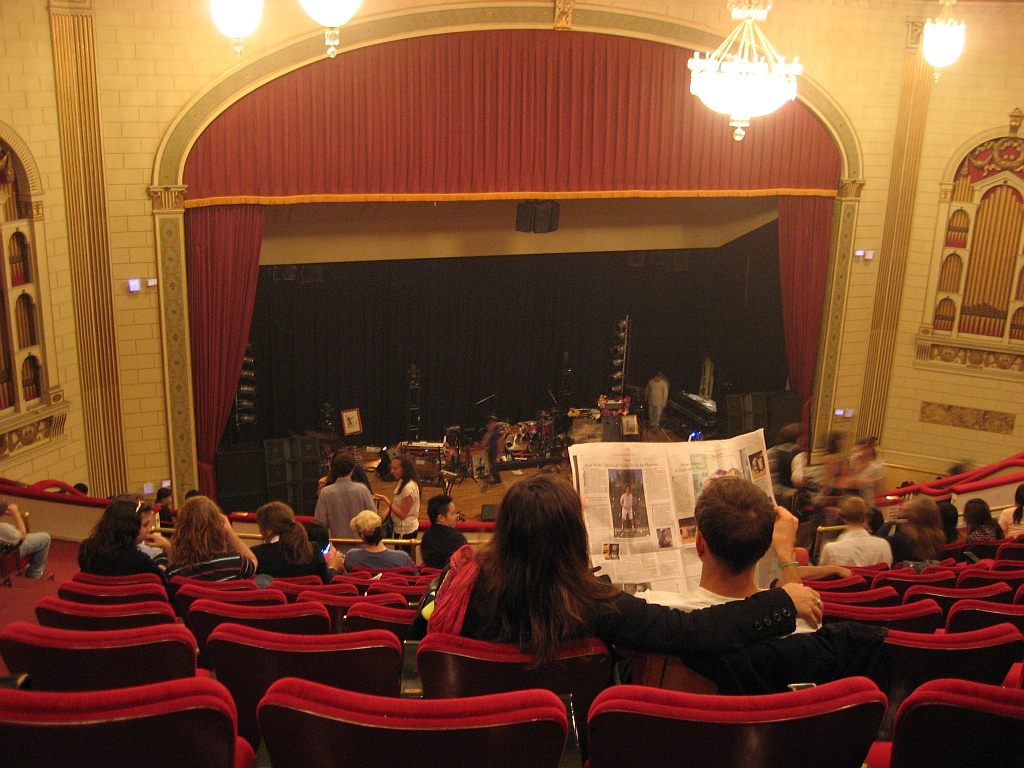
Auditorium interior

The auditorium has a parterre-level orchestra and a single balcony, with a small stage behind the proscenium arch. The auditorium has a seating capacity of 1,495. Every effort was taken to ensure that no seats had obstructed views, which led to the Town Hall's long-standing mantra "Not a bad seat in the house". The balcony is cantilevered from the structural framework, which obviated the need for columns that blocked audience views. The balcony has a loge, or theatrical box. The front of the balcony contains a wrought-iron balustrade. The auditorium retains most of its original wicker seat designs, except for the loge, where modern theatrical seats have been installed. The original seats were capable of unusually high levels of acoustic absorption; they were replaced in the 1980s by seats with similar acoustic qualities. The writer Harold C. Schonberg wrote that only the seating on the balcony had good acoustics, as the balcony's presence muffled the sounds at orchestra level.

The lower sections of the side walls contain marble paneling, which is topped by a molding with a torus motif. Above that, the walls are made of artificial stone, carved in rusticated blocks. Each of the corners contains a fluted pilaster with a Composite-style capital. The side walls contain two niches, which are designed similarly to the proscenium arch. The gilded cornice just beneath the ceiling contains acanthus leaves, under which are dentil blocks. The cornice is supplemented by a band with Greek key fretwork and guilloche moldings. The plaster ceiling is split into coffers, with Greek key and guilloche moldings between each coffer. The center of the ceiling has an Adamesque ornamental medallion with a large chandelier hanging from it. Smaller chandeliers hang from various other parts of the ceiling. The lighting was intended to be indirect, with 2,500 bulbs in total.

The proscenium arch consists of a band with a Greek key molding, supported on either side by ornamented pilasters with Composite-style capitals. Above the center of the arch is a keystone with foliate decorations. The proscenium measures 25 feet (7.6 m) tall and 49.5 feet (15.1 m) wide. The stage curves slightly outward from the proscenium, measuring 20.5 feet (6.2 m) deep at its center and 16.5 feet (5.0 m) deep at its sides. The back of the stage area was designed with a tapestry. On either side of the stage are round-arched screens, which formerly framed the auditorium's organs. Each arch has a sill that contains foliate decorations and is supported by scrolled brackets. The screens themselves are divided into three parts, with a pediment atop the central section, and contain carved swags and garlands. The organs themselves were donated in 1922 but saw little use and were removed in 1960. The organ pipes remain in place, but paintings were placed within the screens in a 1983 renovation.

==== Other features ====
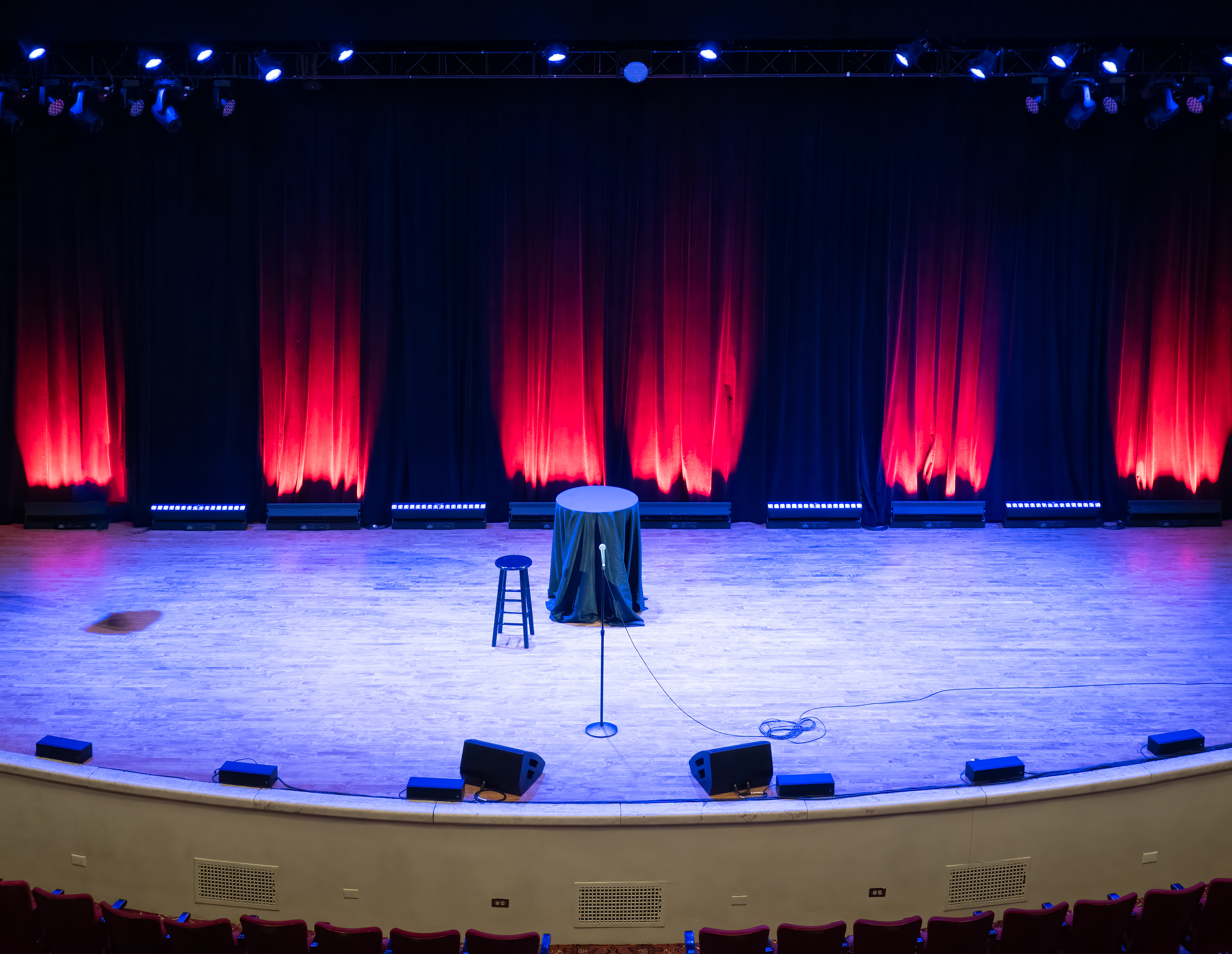
Town Hall stage set up for a comedian

The elevators on the western side of the ground floor, lead to the second through fourth stories. (Note: These were noted in contemporary media as the fifth through seventh stories, respectively.) The second and third stories were designed with club offices and a library, as well as communal spaces such as a bar, lounge, and dining area. The fourth story, which corresponded to the penthouse, had a kitchen and space for employees and food storage. Many of the original decorations, including plaster walls, paneled piers, and neoclassical moldings, still exist.

The second story was intended to contain offices for the League for Political Education, as well as its subsidiaries, the Civic Forum and the Economic Club. In addition, there was to be an adjoining political science library. The third story and the roof were to be arranged with space for a social club. While the League's offices were occupied from the building's completion, the two upper stories were not furnished until the end of 1924. As ultimately completed, the third floor was equipped with two main dining rooms and four private dining rooms. In addition, the fourth floor contained a library decorated with American pine from floor to ceiling. The room, measuring 77 by 42 feet (23 by 13 m), was described in the New York Herald Tribune as "probably the largest pine room in the country", containing three large pine columns and alcoves with space for 9,000 books.

== History ==
=== Early history ===
Eleanor Butler Sanders and five other prominent suffragists established the League for Political Education in 1894 to advocate for women's suffrage. The group held popular "town meetings" about social issues and had 600 members by 1899. The initial meetings were held in Sanders's house and attracted mainly women. Subsequent meetings attracted more men and were hosted in various venues around New York City, since the League had no dedicated clubhouse. The Economic Club and Civic Forum were both founded in 1907 as offshoots of the League for Political Education. In 1912, Anna Blakslee Bliss gave money to fund the construction of a dedicated clubhouse; her initial donation of $1,000 was followed the next year by a larger donation.

=== Development ===
Plans for a dedicated clubhouse for the League were first announced in 1914; the clubhouse would have been at 108–120 West 49th Street. The 49th Street clubhouse, which would likely have been designed by James E. Ware, was never built. The League's real estate committee then researched alternate sites before recommending the plots at 113–123 West 43rd Street, near Times Square. The committee recommended the site because of its proximity to transit. The plots were then purchased in 1917 for $425,000. At the time, Manhattan's theater district was in the process of shifting from Union Square and Madison Square to the vicinity of Times Square, with forty-three Broadway theaters being erected there from 1901 to 1920. The Societies Realty Corporation, which had been formed to construct the building, received a $300,000 loan for the site in 1918. That February, the League announced it would organize "a new club for men and women interested in civic problems", with a new clubhouse at 113 West 43rd Street.

The plans for Town Hall were announced in April 1919. McKim, Mead & White had prepared plans for the building, which was expected to cost $500,000 and be completed by the next year. The structure was to house the League for Political Education, the Civic Forum, and the Economic Club. That July, Russell B. Smith began to raze the existing row houses. Work on Town Hall began on October 10, 1919. The League then scheduled a ceremony where Sanders's grand-niece Eleanor Butler Roosevelt would have laid the cornerstone. E. B. Roosevelt could not attend because she was sick, so her husband Theodore Roosevelt Jr. laid the cornerstone for Town Hall on January 24, 1920. At a June 1920 dinner of the Economic Club, real-estate operator Joseph P. Day raised $7,500 in subscriptions for Town Hall, then tried to compel its attendees to give $100 each by locking them inside a dining room.

=== Opening and early years ===
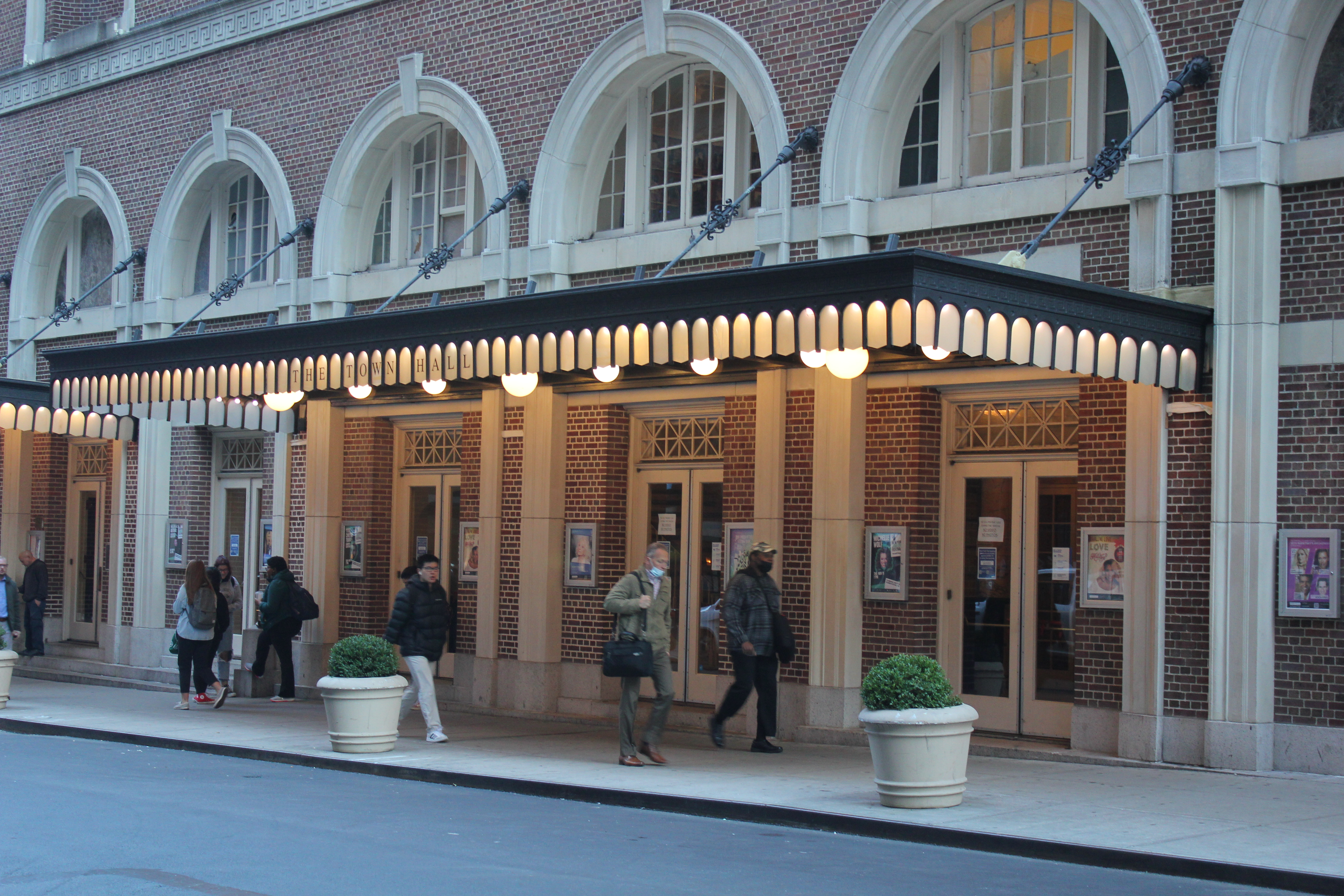
Entrance to Town Hall

Town Hall was dedicated on January 12, 1921, with 1,600 audience members listening to speeches by John J. Pershing and Henry Waters Taft. At its opening, Town Hall hosted lectures during the morning, receptions during the afternoon, and mass meetings in the evening. A magazine from the building's completion wrote that McKim, Mead & White "are responsible for a very beautiful building, lovely in its graceful lines and simplicity". The New-York Tribune wrote: "The need of wise citizenship in New York was never greater. May the new Town Hall aid materially in its growth." US President Woodrow Wilson and president-elect Warren G. Harding both sent congratulatory telegrams to celebrate Town Hall's opening. At the time, the League had 6,000 members in total. Some $1.25 million or $1.35 million had already been spent on its construction.

Town Hall, under its first director Robert Erskine Ely, extended its programming to benefit New York City at large. As a venue, Town Hall was compared with the ideal of a New England town hall, with one book likening the venue to "an idea with a roof over it". This imagery was reinforced by reporters such as Hildegarde Hawthorne, who noted that "America was born in her town halls", as well as another writer, who said "New York's small town longings rise in the concrete". Architectural writer Robert A. M. Stern wrote that Town Hall, along with the Tammany Hall Building at 44 Union Square, were two "unofficial civic monuments" built between the first and second world wars. Within the first year of Town Hall's opening, it had seen 200,000 guests. Some of Town Hall's popularity came from a variety of speeches and programs regarding social issues, but the musical productions were also major attractions. Over a million people used Town Hall within its first three years.

At the time of Town Hall's opening, its interior, aside from the lobby and auditorium, remained incomplete because there was not enough money. Town Hall sought extra donations to complete the work. In late 1921, the Societies Realty Corporation obtained a $500,000 loan from William A. White & Sons. Ely announced the following year that he would form a 100-person Town Hall Council and seek $1,000 pledges for each of the auditorium's 1,500 seats. James Speyer donated an organ to the auditorium in 1922. Anna Blakeley Bliss donated money to cover the estimated $500,000 cost of completing the interior in either 1922 or 1923. In April 1924, Ely announced that Town Hall needed to raise another $600,000 to pay off its debts. Two donors had pledged $400,000 on the condition that the remaining funds be raised by the end of that June. Ultimately, more than three thousand people donated to fund Town Hall's development. The upper stories were completed by the end of December 1924. To celebrate the venue's debts being paid off, Town Hall's management ceremonially burned the mortgage documents on the fourth anniversary of the venue's opening.

The Town Hall Club was established within the two top stories in January 1925, with a thousand members. The club, which accepted both men and women, aimed to promote "a finer public spirit and a better social order". Town Hall acquired a property at 125 West 43rd Street in May 1930, and architect Louis Jallade filed plans to expand the original structure by five stories, as well as develop a twelve-story wing at number 125. This addition was never completed, and Town Hall instead expanded its offices into the existing four-story building at 125 West 43rd Street. Eventually, Town Hall, alongside Carnegie Hall and the old Metropolitan Opera House at 39th Street, became one of New York City's top musical venues in its 20th-century heyday. The neighboring Aeolian Hall closed not long after Town Hall opened.

=== Town Meeting era ===
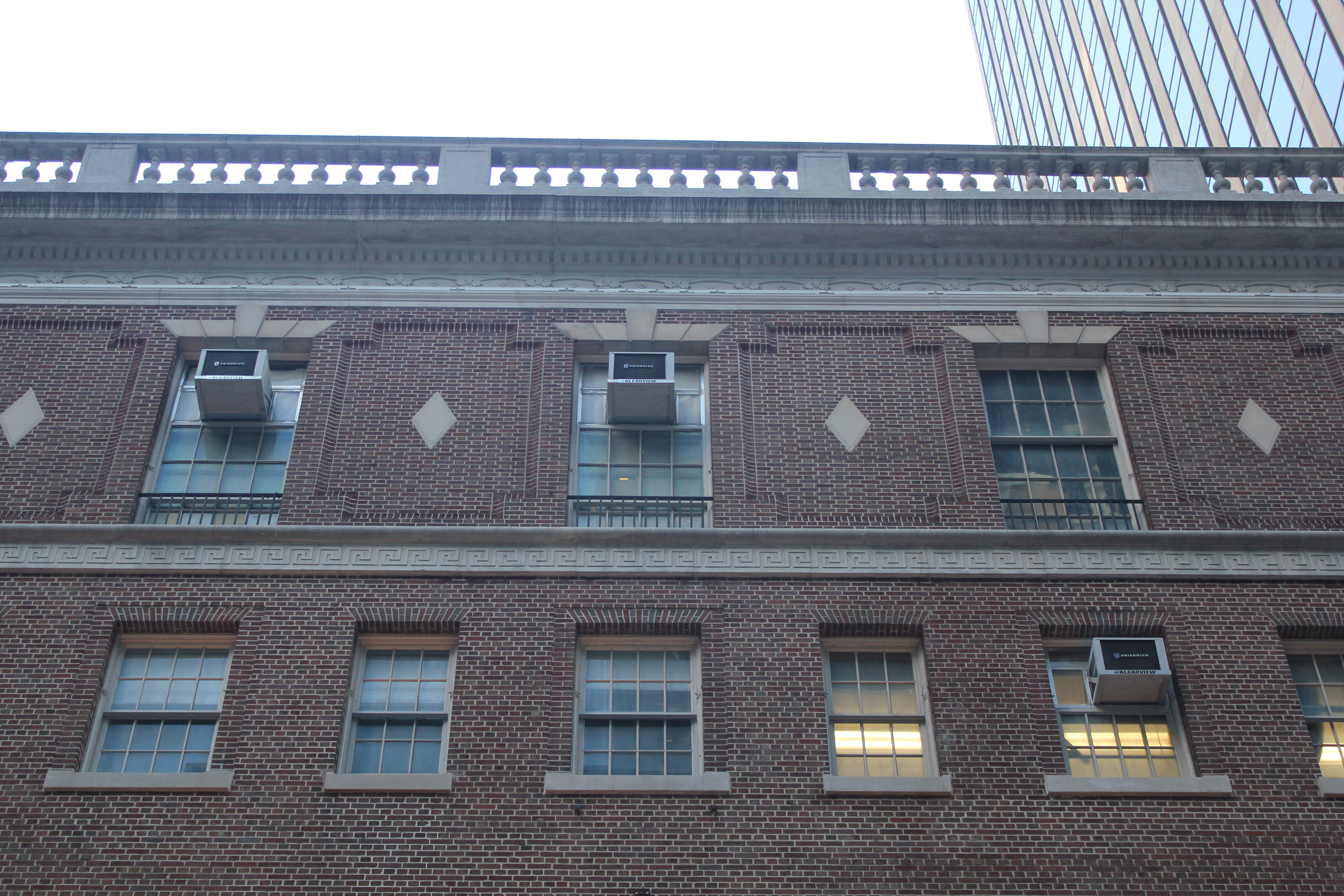
Attic, which housed the Town Hall Club

Ely hired George V. Denny Jr. as an associate director of the league in 1930. Denny thought "an honest system of political education" was vital to the "safety of American democracy", and he believed that Americans should be exposed to multiple viewpoints. In 1934, Denny was inspired to create America's Town Meeting of the Air, a radio show to promote the free exchange of ideas; it became the first public-affairs media program. NBC approved a limited run of the show in early 1934, and Town Meeting premiered at Town Hall on May 30, 1935, to wide praise. The show was broadcast on the NBC Blue Network every Thursday night (the Blue Network eventually split from NBC to become the American Broadcasting Company, or ABC). The Town Hall Club on the building's upper stories stopped hosting weekly roundtable luncheons when Town Meeting aired.

When Town Meeting was not being broadcast, Town Hall continued to be used as a venue for speeches, musical recitals, and other events and performances. Town Hall was frequently called the "busiest theater on Broadway", though it was neither a Broadway theater nor physically on Broadway. Despite Town Hall's success, the League for Political Education still did not own Town Hall outright by 1936, as it still rented the auditorium and offices. Town Hall's leadership planned another expansion of the building in 1937, but this was not carried out. The same year, Denny succeeded Ely as the League's director. The League formally reorganized as Town Hall Inc. in January 1938, with Denny as the new organization's president. The move reflected the fact that political education was no longer the League's priority, especially with Town Hall hosting Town Meeting over the last several years. Town Meeting was being broadcast on 78 stations by 1939; the show's own popularity was largely fueled by its setting within the Town Hall building.

The Town Hall 50th Anniversary Committee, under Denny's leadership, started raising funds for a five-story expansion to Town Hall in 1940, though this was also not built. Town Hall also started a fundraiser in 1946 to pay off the $200,000 mortgage on the building. The venue was musically successful between 1946 and 1948, immediately after World War II. During October 1947 alone, the hall hosted 52 concerts. Town Hall was still used for many solo musical performances during the 1950s.

=== Decline ===
The mid-1950s coincided with a general decrease in the number of performance events. While similar venues like Carnegie Hall saw similar decreases in recitals, Town Hall was particularly affected because it was smaller than other venues such as Carnegie Hall. Furthermore, Times Square was falling into decline at the time, and Town Hall was being used more often for the premieres of fledgling artists before they appeared at Carnegie Hall or Lincoln Center. Town Hall Inc. evicted the Town Hall Club from the building in April 1955 after falling into debt and failing to pay $9,500 of rent. The Town Hall Club filed for bankruptcy on April 6, 1955. It had only 650 members at the time, far below its peak of 1,900. Town Meeting ultimately ended in 1956.

==== New York University operation ====
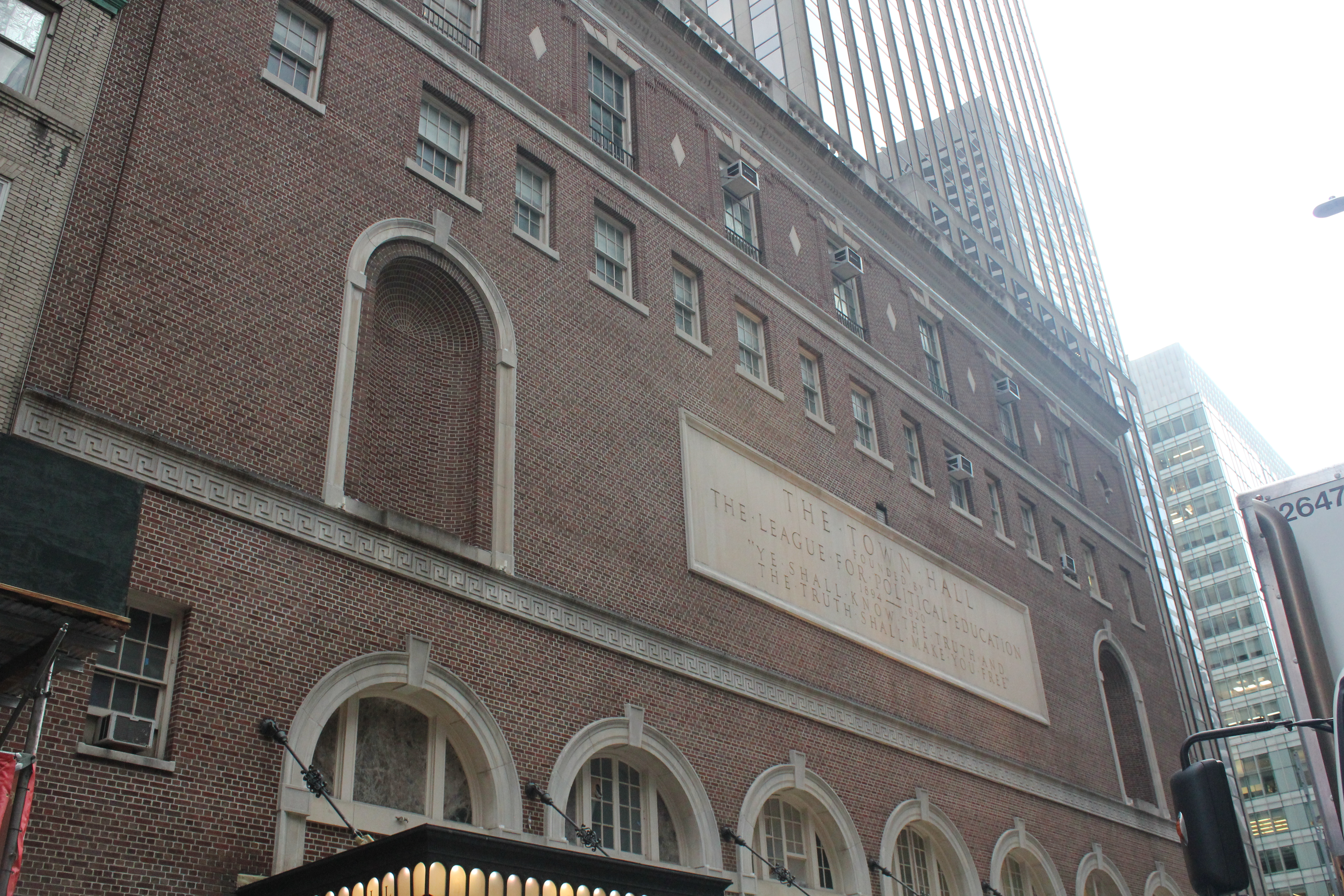
Looking east

In October 1955, the New York University (NYU)'s alumni club signed a five-year lease with Town Hall Inc. to use the upper floors formerly occupied by the Town Hall Club. NYU then renovated the two top floors. The NYU alumni clubhouse opened on September 12, 1956. Concurrently, the university booked Town Hall for all evenings for the following several months, eliminating Town Hall's mounting debt load. NYU and Town Hall Inc. also signed an agreement in which NYU would take over Town Hall's programming, and NYU president Alvin C. Eurich became chairman of the Town Hall board in 1957. NYU fully acquired Town Hall in March 1958, and the venue became known as The Town Hall of New York University, an educational and cultural center directed by Ormand Drake. The annex at 125 West 43rd Street, which had been used for offices for Town Meeting, was sold in early 1959.

The Town Hall of NYU held its first performances in October 1958. Within a few months, The New York Times had written that "Town Hall was much emptier than usual by too high a rent scale". This was worsened by the opening of Lincoln Center in 1962, which drew events away from Town Hall. For over a decade after NYU's takeover, Town Hall was "abandoned by the great names in music who had once made it a mecca for the finest in recitals and chamber music", according to the Times. The organ was removed by 1960. To raise money, in 1966, NYU leased some air rights above Town Hall to the Durst Organization, developer of the neighboring building at 1133 Avenue of the Americas, for $25,000 a year. By the end of that decade, Lincoln Center had completed its new Alice Tully Hall, and Town Hall was largely supplanted in stature. This was evidenced by the number of bookings at both venues in 1969: while Tully Hall was nearly completely booked, less than half of available dates at Town Hall were booked.

In 1971, Jerrold Ross became director of Town Hall, and he scheduled a series of concerts and speeches. At the time, the lobby and marquee were being renovated; an electronic organ was installed during this time. A task force also recommended that NYU sell off Town Hall to save money. Ross resigned as director in 1974 and was replaced by Jesse Reese. By March 1975, the venue was in danger of closing permanently unless $365,000 was pledged by that August to support the programming over the next three years. The Shubert Organization granted $125,000 for Town Hall that May, and enough money was raised by August to sustain the venue for two years. A fundraiser was held that November to raise the remaining money. Still, NYU president John C. Sawhill warned in mid-1977 that there was not enough money to keep Town Hall open past 1978.

==== Closure and preservation ====
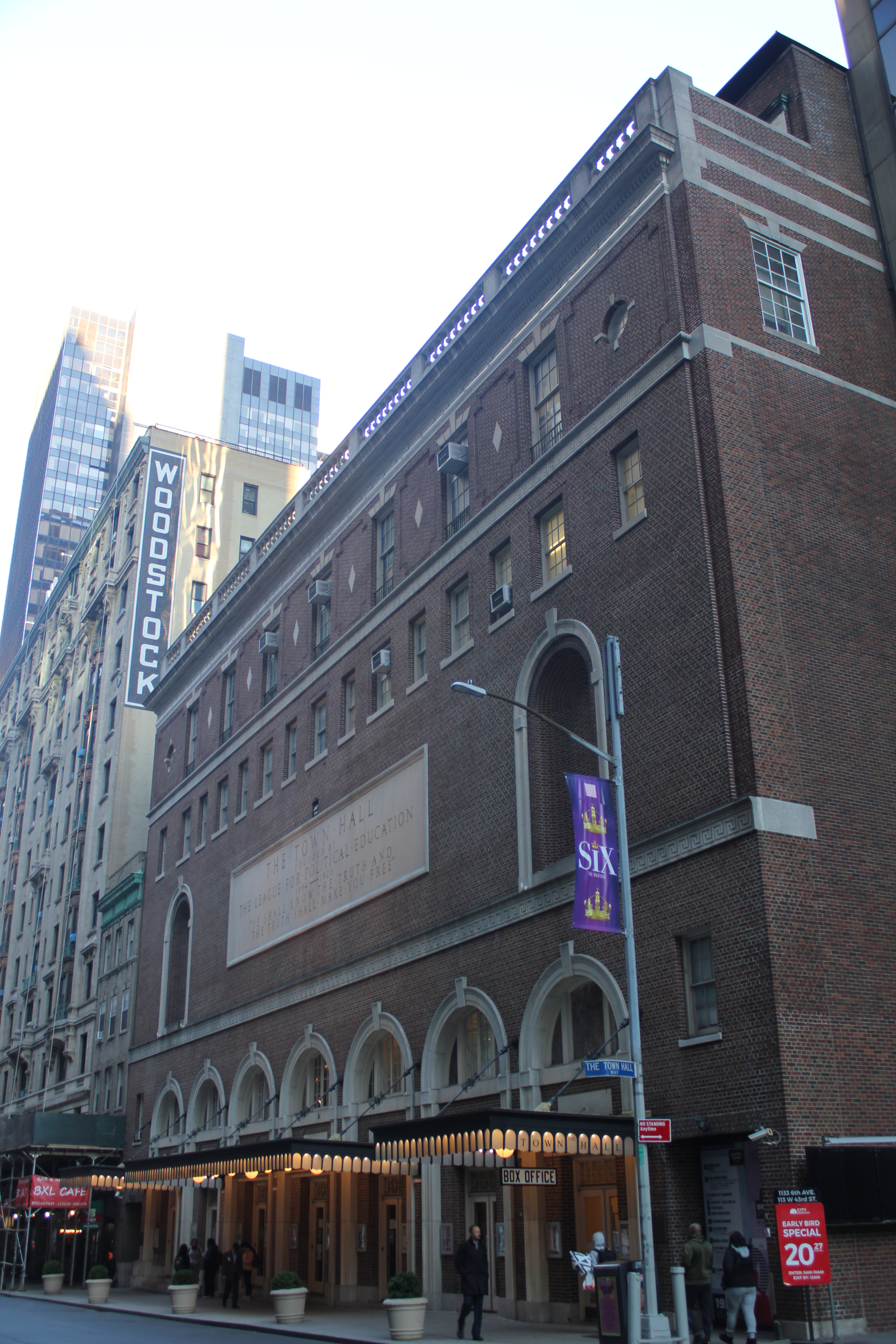
Looking west from across 43rd Street

Town Hall had $5 in its bank account by 1978, and there were concerns that Town Hall could be demolished. With Town Hall's annual operating costs ranging from $50,000 to $100,000, NYU's board of trustees voted in February 1978 to close the auditorium within six months. The NYU Club and Alvin Ailey Dance Company would continue to use the upper stories, and NYU planned to hand over operation to "a responsible group" rather than demolish it. By then, the venue was mostly vacant during prime-time evenings and weekends, and the neighborhood had become dilapidated. The high crime rates of Times Square also discouraged potential events. Although 355 events had been hosted in the 1977–1978 season, the announcement of Town Hall's closure had resulted in the loss of over $165,000 of potential revenue for 1978–1979.

After Town Hall's closure was announced, the Committee to Save Town Hall organized a campaign to preserve the venue. Despite the advocacy in favor of Town Hall, NYU's trustees closed the venue and planned to turn over the operation to the nonprofit Town Hall Foundation. In September 1978, Craig Anderson of the Hudson Guild acquired the lease to Town Hall at $1 per year. He created the Town Hall Theater Foundation and announced that the auditorium would be split into two smaller theaters. The Town Hall Foundation was to take title to the venue while the Town Hall Theater Foundation would operate it. Amid opposition to the plan, Anderson then said he would consider retaining the original 1,500-seat auditorium and erecting a new theater on the roof.

The 1978 preservation effort led the New York City Landmarks Preservation Commission (LPC) to consider the venue for city landmark status. The LPC designated the facade and auditorium as city landmarks in November 1978. Following the landmark designation, the electronic organ was removed. Hudson Guild then asked the LPC for permission to convert Town Hall into two auditoriums, but its application was denied twice. Because of this disagreement, Anderson reneged from his lease of Town Hall in January 1979. The venue saw a net loss of $138,000 in 1978 and $200,000 in 1979.

=== Revival ===
==== 1980s renovation ====
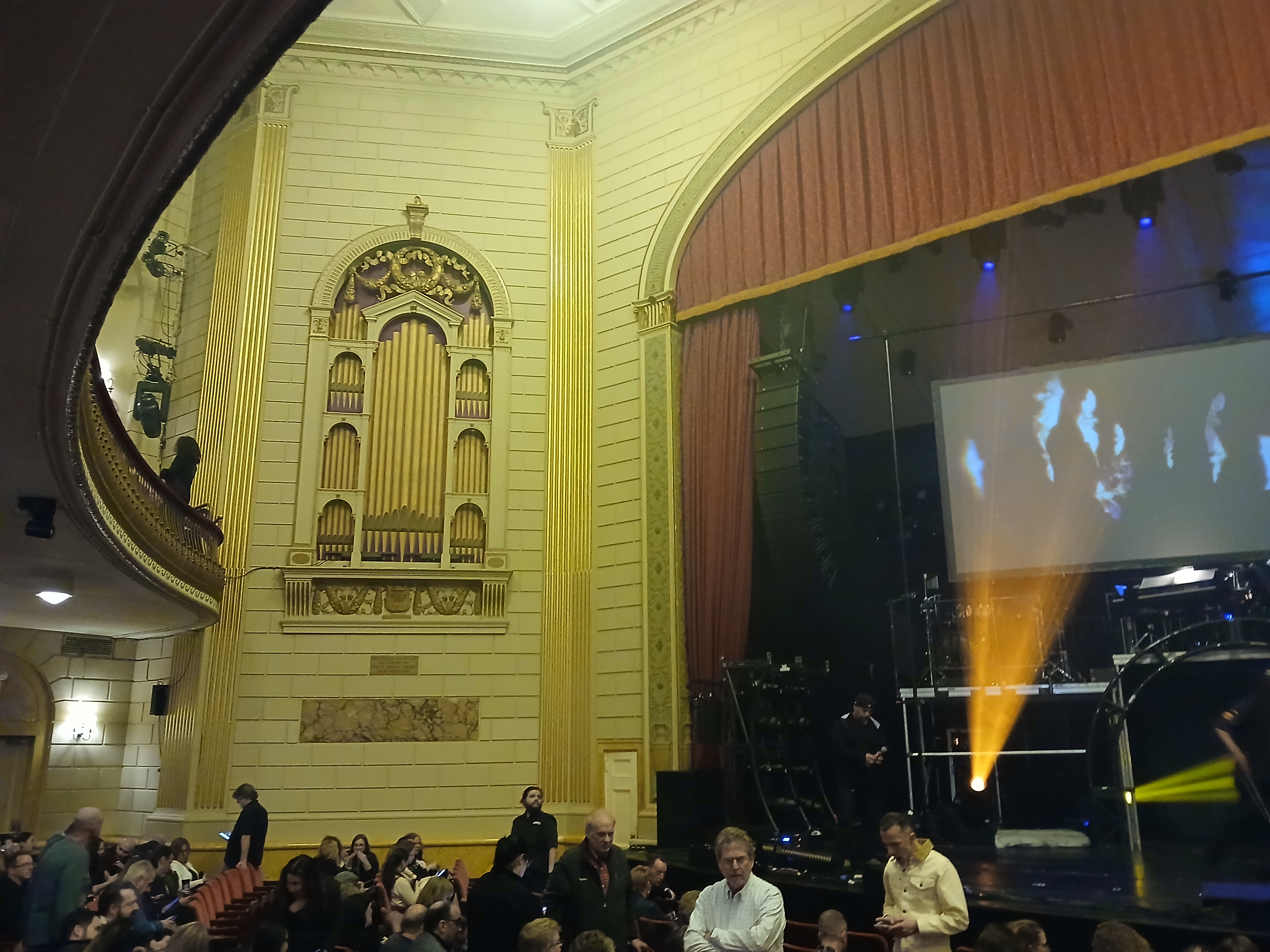
The arch to the left of the proscenium, seen from orchestra level

In March 1979, the Town Hall Foundation took title to Town Hall, though NYU continued to collect payments from the air rights. The foundation, led by Marvin Leffler, acquired the Town Hall for a nominal fee of $10. Leffler, a metal-product manufacturer, received no salary from the foundation; Lawrence Zucker was hired as the director. NYU also provided a $70,000 subsidy, giving financial support to Town Hall for two years. The foundation did not raise any money for two years after acquiring the venue. Instead, the foundation operated Town Hall exclusively as a rental venue, charging $1,200 to host an event outside the morning hours. Within a year of taking over Town Hall, the foundation had started restoring parts of the auditorium. Town Hall was added to the National Register of Historic Places in April 1980, which the foundation celebrated later that year with a concert and a plaque. To avoid running a deficit, the foundation planned performances only if there was funding for them.

The Town Hall Foundation needed to raise $1.2 million to restore the building; the National Endowment for the Arts would provide a $400,000 grant if the remainder was raised privately. The federal government would provide another $300,000 to fund the proposed $1.5 million cost of the renovation. By 1981, Town Hall was finally profitable and was raising $2 million for operation and restoration. The foundation planned to install plaques on the auditorium's seats to honor donors who gave over $1,000. Larger donors would also get different parts of the building named after them; anyone who gave $1.5 million would get the entire auditorium named in their honor. Some $250,000 had been raised toward the proposed cost by April 1982. The work was to be performed over a five-year period in three phases.

In 1983, the federal government allocated funds to Town Hall's renovation. Leffler also obtained grants from private foundations to fund the renovation, but nineteen banks rejected the foundation's request for a mortgage. The mortgage ultimately came from Apple Bank chairman Jerome McDougal, who, as a child, had performed in a brass band at Town Hall. By mid-1984, the Town Hall Foundation received an Urban Development Action Grant of $428,000, and The Kresge Foundation had donated another $100,000, enough to pay for a full renovation. Town Hall was closed in July 1984 for a renovation spanning two and a half months. The facade was cleaned, while the auditorium was refurbished and restored, with a new carpet and renovated seats. Because of the landmark status of the building, the seats were restored to their original condition rather than being replaced, while the rear wall was coated in wash to preserve the acoustics. Leffler also sought to make the building wheelchair-accessible and relocate some of the rooms. The renovated hall officially reopened on October 14, 1984.

==== Late 20th century to present ====
When Town Hall reopened, it initially primarily hosted Town Hall Foundation presentations, along with event rentals. Rental income sometimes comprised 90% of the venue's budget during that decade. In the late 1980s, it began sponsoring a wider range of events, such as classical and vocal chamber music series. John Rockwell of The New York Times described the building in 1989 as "about the best midsized concert hall in town", at which point it was still being rented out much of the time. The NYU Club continued to occupy Town Hall's upper-story clubhouse space until 1989, when the club filed for bankruptcy. The clubhouse space was leased the following to the New Yorker Club, a majority-minority social club, which raised $800,000 to renovate the clubhouse space.

The Town Hall Foundation received a $281,000 grant in 1992 to fund the restoration of Town Hall's marquee. The architect Bonnie Roche was also hired to replace the doors, add information kiosks, and make the venue wheelchair-accessible. Town Hall had become profitable by the late 1990s, with an attendance of 400,000 in 1996. The Town Hall Foundation was raising money for a roof replacement, seat refurbishment, and repainting of the interior. Amid the ongoing restoration of Times Square, the foundation also wanted to produce its own events. During that decade, it started raising funds for a sound system, and it also sought to create a chamber orchestra and host a festival of foreign films.

In March 2012, the United States Department of the Interior designated Town Hall as a National Historic Landmark. The Rockwell Group proposed replacing the lighting on the facade and marquee in 2019.

== Notable performances ==
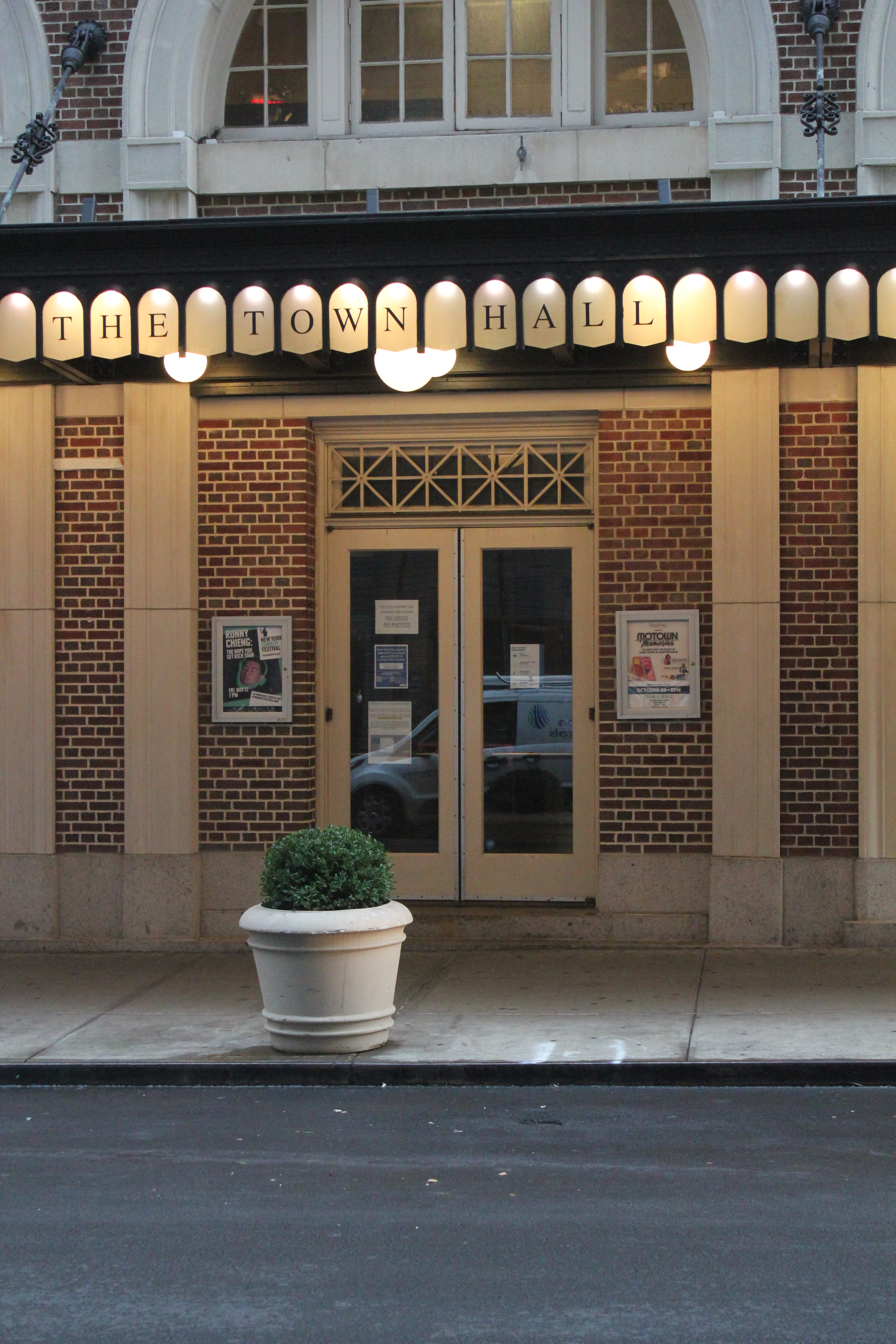
Entrance to the Town Hall

While the Town Hall was initially intended as a speaking hall, it quickly became known for musical performances and recitals, leading one New York Times writer to call it an "accidental concert hall". McKim, Mead & White had written in 1921 that the venue could be adapted to "concerts, moving picture exhibitions, and similar entertainment". Throughout its history, the Town Hall has hosted performances by hundreds of musicians and composers.

=== 1920s and 1930s ===
Town Hall hosted musical performances and other recitals initially as a way to gain revenue. The first musical event held at the venue was a recital by Spanish violinist Juan Manén on February 12, 1921. That December, German composer Richard Strauss gave three concerts, an event the Town Hall Foundation described as giving "the hall it's [sic] christening as an ideal space for musical performances". Cellist Pablo Casals made his debut in January 1923, followed the next month by a dance recital by Ruth St. Denis. Singer and actor Paul Robeson first performed Black spiritual songs at the Town Hall in 1927, guitarist Andrés Segovia first gave a recital in 1929, and Richard Tauber made his American premiere there in 1931. In its first decade, the Town Hall's other events included Edna St. Vincent Millay's public poetry reading debut in 1928 and a screening of amateur films in 1929.

Town Hall sponsored the first season of the Town Hall Endowment Series in 1930. The series featured such figures as Mischa Elman, Margaret Matzenauer, John McCormack, Rosa Ponselle, and Sergei Rachmaninoff, who all appeared in the 1931–1932 season, as well as Feodor Chaliapin for the 1932–1933 season. The series originally had five performances per season, but this was changed in 1933 to eight performances.

Outside of the Endowment Series, the Colonial Dames of America and the National Society of the Colonial Dames of America presented a play in 1932, which depicted the inauguration of George Washington as US president. Pianist Ruth Slenczynska made her debut at the Town Hall in 1933, aged eight. Antonia Brico's all-woman orchestra debuted at the Town Hall in early 1935, and contralto Marian Anderson made her Town Hall debut that December after facing discrimination against African-Americans at other venues. Alice Tully sang at Town Hall in 1936, The next year, young violinist Isaac Stern debuted at Town Hall, and Rosalyn Tureck gave a six-week series of Bach recitals entirely from memory. Other performers of the decade included Lily Pons in 1938 and the Von Trapp family the same year.

=== 1940s to 1970s ===
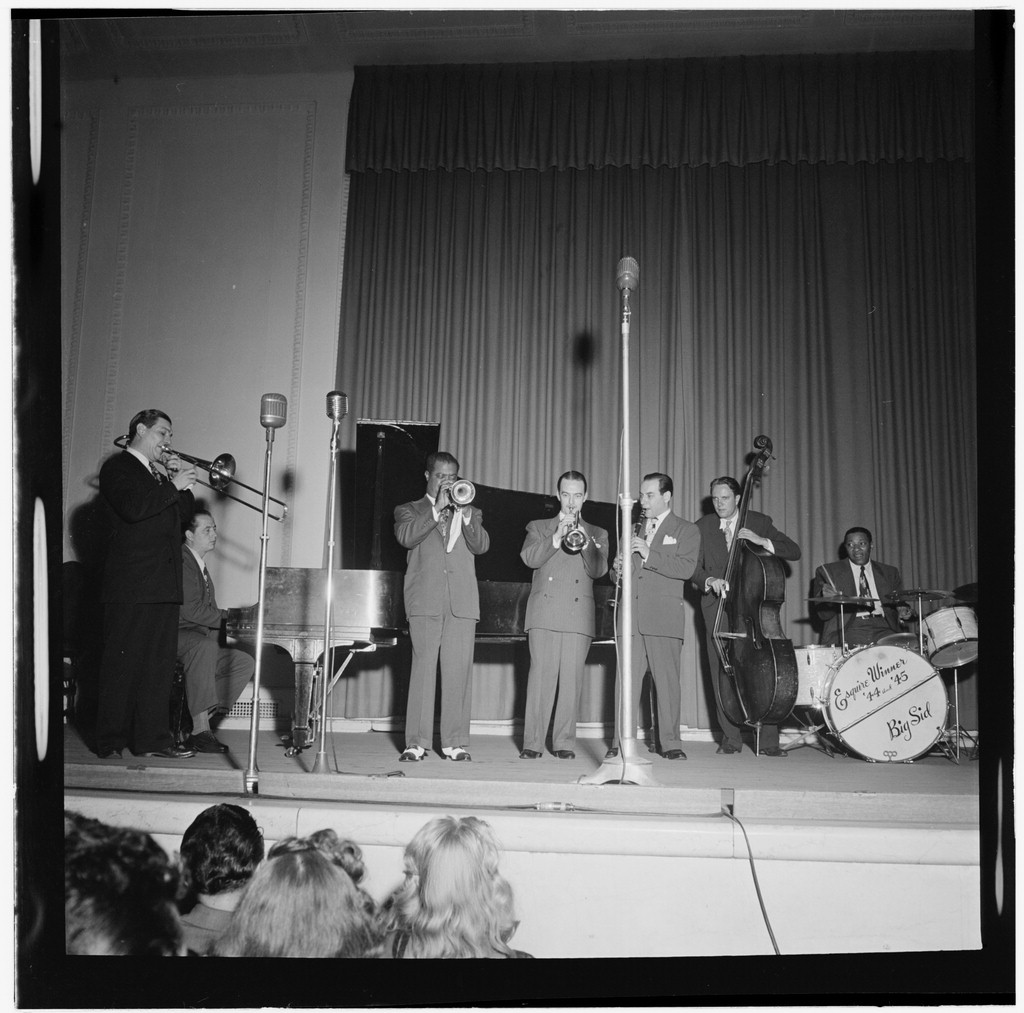
Jack Teagarden, Dick Cary, Louis Armstrong, Bobby Hackett, Peanuts Hucko, Bob Haggart, and Sid Catlett, c. 1947

The Kolisch Quartet gave the world premiere performance of Béla Bartók's String Quartet No. 6 at Town Hall in 1941. Especially popular at Town Hall were performances of jazz music. Guitarist Eddie Condon began holding a series of jazz concerts at Town Hall in February 1942, and he began hosting a biweekly series of jazz concerts that November. By 1944, the performances were sold out, and NBC Blue broadcast the concerts under the Eddie Condon's Jazz Concerts radio program from 1944 to 1945. One such concert by Dizzy Gillespie, Charlie Parker, Don Byas, Al Haig, Curley Russell, Max Roach, and Sid Catlett on June 22, 1945, was the first public performance of the jazz style that came to be known as bebop. Another jazz concert in 1946, featuring Billie Holiday's first solo appearance, sold out rapidly.

Town Hall's musical popularity peaked in the late 1940s and early 1950s. During June 1947, Town Hall hosted a Louis Armstrong concert, which led to the formation of Louis Armstrong and His All Stars. In 1949, Burl Ives gave a folk-song concert, which was popular enough that the audience requested seven encore performances. Lotte Lenya gave a concert in 1951 in memory of her late husband, composer Kurt Weill. In April 1953, Anna Russell gave a performance of her humorous analysis of Wagner's Der Ring des Nibelungen, which was recorded. Duke Ellington performed for The Fresh Air Fund in 1957, and Carlos Montoya gave a guitar recital. The events in 1958 included Betty Allen's first New York City performance; the American Opera Society's presentation of The Coronation of Poppea; and the 25th Year Retrospective Concert of the music of John Cage. Igor Stravinsky gave the US premiere of his composition Threni in 1959. Nina Simone performed in September 1959, and the concert was released as Nina Simone at Town Hall, her first live album.

Shows in the 1960s included a benefit for the Morningside Mental Hygiene Clinic in 1960, Bob Dylan's large-concert debut in 1963, and a Coretta Scott King Freedom Concert in 1964. Jazz composer and bandleader Charles Mingus held two concerts there, resulting in his live albums from October 1962 and April 1964. Bill Evans and his trio recorded a live album in 1966, Bill Evans at Town Hall.

A panel debate between Norman Mailer and feminist activists Jacqueline Caballos, Jill Johnston, Diana Trilling, and Germaine Greer took place on April 30, 1971. Chris Hegedus and D. A. Pennebaker filmed the event and released Town Bloody Hall in 1979.

=== 1980s to present ===
In 1982, the Town Hall Foundation started to host the People's Symphony Concerts series. The cast of the folk music mockumentary film A Mighty Wind performed in character at the Town Hall in September 2003 as part of a seven-city tour. In September 2009, singer Whitney Houston chose the Town Hall for her first interview in seven years, appearing on Oprah Winfrey's season premiere; the Town Hall was where Houston performed for the first time at the age of 14. Peter Schickele, who gave his first concert at Town Hall in 1965, gave a 50th anniversary concert there in 2015.

When hosted by Garrison Keillor, the radio show A Prairie Home Companion was often broadcast live from the Town Hall in its New York appearances while on tour. Its successor, Live from Here, hosted by Chris Thile, now appears most frequently in the Town Hall. The venue was announced as the home of Live from Here for its 2019–2020 season.

== Other notable events ==
=== Recordings ===
Over the years, several musical performances have been recorded at Town Hall, including:

- 1947: Louis Armstrong Town Hall Concert
- 1947: One Night Stand – The Town Hall Concert 1947, with Sarah Vaughan and Lester Young
- 1954: Billy Taylor Trio at Town Hall, by Billy Taylor, Earl May, and Charlie Smith
- 1959: The Thelonious Monk Orchestra at Town Hall, by Thelonious Monk
- 1959: Sammy Davis Jr. at Town Hall, by Sammy Davis Jr.
- 1959: Nina Simone at Town Hall, by Nina Simone

=== Speeches ===
Various activists, politicians, artists, and other speakers have long preferred Town Hall for speeches, even before the America's Town Meeting of the Air era. The Town Hall's opening week in January 1921 included a speech by suffragist Carrie Chapman Catt and General John J. Pershing. Lady Astor, the first woman to serve in the Parliament of the United Kingdom, spoke at Town Hall in its early years, as did social reformer Jane Addams. The authors Edna Ferber, Henry James, Thomas Mann, and Carl Sandburg have also spoken at Town Hall, as well as politicians including US presidents Calvin Coolidge, Theodore Roosevelt, and Woodrow Wilson, and British prime minister Winston Churchill. Naval officer Richard E. Byrd spoke about military issues, educator Booker T. Washington talked about racial issues, and labor leader Samuel Gompers discussed labor.

Notable speeches have included a lecture on November 13, 1921, birth control advocate Margaret Sanger was arrested and carried off the stage after attempting to speak to a mixed-sex audience about contraception. Anarchist Emma Goldman spoke at Town Hall while in the US on a visa preventing political lectures. In 1960, former US first lady Eleanor Roosevelt spoke at Town Hall to promote Adlai E. Stevenson II's presidential campaign, and an Africa Freedom Day rally was held. Town Hall also hosted what The New York Times described as "musical lectures", including an event in which Thomas Beecham spoke while playing the piano.

When America's Town Meeting of the Air was broadcast from 1935 to 1956, each episode generally included a set of brief remarks on a predetermined topic from four speakers, followed by short questions from audience members. George Denny moderated the discussions. The first episodes from the 1930s featured numerous debates on economic, political, and social issues, and even extreme viewpoints were entertained. Such episodes included discussions about the New Deal, press freedom, and labor unions. During World War II, the broadcasts focused on wartime discussions, which tended to be controversial among the audience members. Other episodes of the 1940s included discussions on racial issues, with both Langston Hughes and Clare Boothe Luce; preventing world famine; the legality of communism, with Joseph McCarthy; and dependency on welfare, with Hubert Humphrey. After World War II, episodes tended to focus on international relations.

Town Hall is still used in the modern day for political debates and speeches. In 1996, Town Hall hosted a debate between columnists from the left-wing magazine The Nation and the right-wing magazine National Review. Town Hall also hosted a summit in 2000 in opposition to globalization, as well as a 2016 debate between US presidential candidates Bernie Sanders and Hillary Clinton.

=== Educational programs ===
Educational programs were also provided at Town Hall. In 1941, Town Hall Inc. hosted the Town Hall Leadership School, a short course that taught adults to become certified teachers, and the First National Town Hall Conference, a forum and discussion group composed of leaders from across the US. A Red Cross defense course opened at Town Hall in 1943. Town Hall also began offering courses for adults in topics such as national politics, writing, philosophy, psychology, and world affairs in 1944. These courses attracted nearly 2,500 students in their first year.

=== Memorials and commencements ===
In 1929, the American Civil Liberties Union booked Town Hall for a memorial service for anarchists Sacco and Vanzetti after the memorial was rejected by venues in Boston. The actor John Drew was memorialized in 1932, as was Jane Addams in 1935. The short film St. Louis Blues premiered at Town Hall during a memorial for blues singer Bessie Smith on January 1, 1948.

Town Hall has also hosted commencements from schools and colleges. In the venue's early years, those included local institutions such as the School for Printing Pressmen and the Mechanics Institute, De La Salle Institute, and Calhoun School. Commencements continued through the late 20th century, such as those for the City University of New York's Graduate Center in the 1990s. The Community Church of New York started using Town Hall as a house of worship in 1933, when the church's old building was demolished. The church relocated in 1948 to 35th Street.

== Management and operations ==
Town Hall is managed by the Town Hall Foundation, Inc. The foundation was formed in 1973 as a fundraising arm of the Town Hall at New York University and took over the operation in 1979.

The Town Hall Foundation offers free morning performances to public school students. It also features programming in alliance with Theatreworks USA as part of its Arts in Education program. Since 1988, Town Hall has offered jazz programming with the Not Just Jazz series of concerts. In addition, in 2019, the foundation established the Lena Horne Prize for Artists Creating Social Impact, which is distributed annually to socially active artists and performers.

== See also ==
- List of National Historic Landmarks in New York City
- List of New York City Designated Landmarks in Manhattan from 14th to 59th Streets
- National Register of Historic Places listings in Manhattan from 14th to 59th Streets
- Category:Albums recorded at the Town Hall
