= America's Town Meeting of the Air =

Public affairs discussion broadcast on radio

- 1935 promotional brochure for America's Town Meeting of the Air
- Genre: analysis, commentary, discussion
- Running time: 60 minutes
- Country of origin: United States
- Language: English
- Syndicates: NBC Blue Network (1935–1943); ABC Radio (1943–1956)
- Hosted by: George V. Denny, Jr. John Daly
- Recording studio: The Town Hall, New York City
- Original release: May 30, 1935 – July 1, 1956
- Sponsored by: Reader's Digest (1944-1945)

America's Town Meeting of the Air is a public affairs discussion broadcast on radio and television from May 30, 1935, to July 1, 1956, mainly on the NBC Blue Network and its successor, ABC Radio. One of radio's first talk shows, it began as a six-week experiment, and NBC itself did not expect much from it.

Broadcast live from New York City's Town Hall, America's Town Meeting of the Air debuted on Thursday May 30, 1935, and only 18 of NBC's affiliates carried it. The topic for the first show was "Which Way America: Fascism, Communism, Socialism or Democracy?" The moderator was George V. Denny, Jr., executive director of the League for Political Education, which produced the program. Denny moderated the program from 1935 to 1952 and had a major role in choosing weekly topics. Denny and the League wanted to create a program that would replicate the Town Meetings that were held in the early days of the United States.

== Current events and issues ==
The show's introduction tried to evoke the old town meetings, as the voice of the mythical town crier announced, “Town meeting tonight! Come to the old Town Hall and talk it over!” Denny and the League believed that a radio town meeting could enhance the public's interest in current events. Denny worried that an uninformed public was bad for democracy; and he believed society had become so polarized that the average person didn't listen to other points of view.

His goal was to create a new kind of educational program, one that would be entertaining as well as mentally challenging, while exposing listeners to various perspectives on the issues of the day. Explaining the rationale behind a radio town meeting, Denny wrote that it was "... a device which is designed to attract [the average American's] attention and stimulate his interest in the complex economic, social and political problems which he must have a hand in solving."

== Audience participation ==
On paper, America's Town Meeting looked like a typical panel discussion, with high-profile celebrity guests, who were experts on a particular current issue. For example, on a December 19, 1935, show about Social Security, one of the panelists was U.S. Secretary of Labor Frances Perkins, who explained and defended the new government program. (What she said about it can be heard here.)

But while many shows had well-known experts, few had the kind of audience participation that this one did. They cheered or applauded when they liked what a speaker said, and they hissed or booed when they felt the speaker was wrong. They also heckled: part of the format of the show was to allow members of the audience to ask questions, and while the rule was the question had to be brief—about 25-30 words maximum, with no insults or name-calling, that didn't stop people from using sarcasm, or strongly disagreeing with what a guest had said.

Even the listeners at home could take part: while at first there was no easy way to get callers on the air, by 1936, NBC engineers had designed a method for letting listeners call in from remote locations where they had gathered to listen to the show.

== Educational uses ==
The show succeeded beyond NBC's expectations, and the six-week trial became permanent. As Denny had hoped, listeners not only enjoyed hearing famous newsmakers engaging in discussion but they also enjoyed hearing members of the audience challenging these newsmakers. It wasn't long before Denny was receiving fan mail: His first broadcast received about 3,000 letters, much to his surprise.

By the 1937–8 season, mail averaged between 2,000 and 4,000 letters a week, an amazing number for an educational program. It also inspired listeners to form "listener clubs," where members would listen as a group and then discuss the topic themselves.

America's Town Meeting became so popular in the public discourse that during the late 1930s and into the early 40s, Denny wrote a monthly column for Current History magazine, in which he gave summaries of the major points made by some of his Town Meeting guests, and then gave readers news quizzes. Educators found it so useful that Denny and NBC put program listings and what the speakers had said into booklet form, which was disseminated to public school civics teachers.

== Guests ==
Over the years, America's Town Meeting became known for its interesting guests, many of whom were important newsmakers. Denny did not shy away from controversy: his panelists included Socialist presidential candidate Norman Thomas, American Communist Party leader Earl Browder, and civil libertarian Morris Ernst.

But there were also guests from the world of literature (author Pearl Buck, poets Carl Sandburg and Langston Hughes) and a number of famous scientists, politicians, journalists, and public intellectuals.

== Topics ==
Advertisement promoting a broadcast of the Town Meeting of the Air. Note that the program is billed as on the "Blue Network", 20 months after the Blue Network was officially renamed ABC Radio.

The topics were meant to inspire discussion, and Denny tried to select subjects that would get people talking long after the show was over. Among them were discussions about whether America truly had freedom of the press (and whether censorship was sometimes necessary); whether the United States should enter World War II or remain neutral; and why the United States public schools weren't doing a better job.

But during World War II, Denny repeatedly encountered what he had most sought to avoid: angry audience members who didn't want to listen to other viewpoints and who wanted to criticize, rather than debate. Worse still, some audience members expressed isolationist and anti-Semitic views. Denny struggled to maintain the show's openness and objectivity, but it became increasingly difficult to do so.

== Television ==
On three separate occasions the show also aired as a television network series over both NBC and ABC. In all three cases the broadcasts were simulcasts of the radio show. The first televised series ran from December 18, 1941 through February 19, 1942 over NBC. The second series ran from October 1948 to June 1949, and the third series ran from January to July in 1952, both over ABC.

== Decline ==
The 1930s were definitely the heyday of America's Town Meeting, although it remained on the air throughout the 1940s and sometimes still inspired the kinds of passionate discussions Denny had hoped for. But Town Meeting underwent a number of time changes during the 1940s. Some were the result of changes at NBC — the network that had been called the NBC Blue Network was sold in 1943, and it first became known as the "Blue Network," and then was renamed the American Broadcasting Company in late 1945. (Some advertisements and promotions for "Town Meeting," however, would still refer to the show as "a Blue Network program" or originating on "ABC's Blue Network" as late as 1949.)

Some of the programs on the new network were shifted around, and not only did Town Meeting get a new timeslot—it was moved from 9:30pm to 8:30pm—but by 1944, it even got a sponsor—Reader's Digest, although Denny reportedly actively resisted commercial sponsorship of the program and the magazine's sponsorship deal lasted only one year. At times, the show was 60 minutes, sometimes 45 minutes and sometimes only a half-hour. And when television came along, interest in Denny's radio program gradually faded. On April 27, 1952 he was replaced as moderator by John Daly, and the show was finally canceled on July 1, 1956.

Denny, who continued to believe in educational media, joined an organization that planned international seminars, and he hoped to create an international version of Town Meeting. He died of a cerebral hemorrhage on November 11, 1959, at the age of 60.

== Awards and honors ==
ABC Radio and George V. Denny, Jr. were given a 1945 Peabody Award for Outstanding Educational Program for America's Town Meeting of the Air.

In 2009, the National Recording Preservation Board selected the May 8, 1941, episode of America's Town Meeting of the Air ("Should Our Ships Convoy Materials to England?" with guests Reinhold Niebuhr and John Flynn) for inclusion in the holdings of the National Archives' audiovisual collection.

== Works cited ==
- Denny, George V. Jr. "Radio Builds Democracy." Journal of Educational Sociology, vol. 14, #6, February 1941, pp. 370–377.
- Dunning, John. On the Air: The Encyclopedia of Old-Time Radio, Oxford, 1998.
- "George V. Denny, Radio Host, Dead." New York Times, November 12, 1959, p. 35.
- Hilmes, Michele, editor. "NBC: America's Network." University of California Press, 2007.
- Overstreet, Harry A. and Bonaro W. Overstreet. Town Meeting Comes to Town. Harper and Brothers, 1938.
- Sparling, Earl. "Town Meeting's On the Air Again." Forum and Century, October 1939, pp. 164–8.

== Listen to ==
- America's Town Meeting of the Air (Internet Archive)
- America's Town Meeting of the Air (New York Public Radio)
- Library of Congress essay on its selection for the National Recording Registry.
- "America's Town Meeting of the Air". Radio Echoes. 1935–1952.
