= League for Political Education =

Organization in New York City

- Merged into: The Town Hall
- Formation: 1894
- Founder: Eleanor Butler Sanders
- Merger of: 1938
- Purpose: women's suffrage and general education for all persons on the important issues of the day
- Headquarters: The Town Hall, 123 West 43rd Street
- Location: New York City, United States of America
- Services: education, the arts
- Director: Robert Erskine Ely (1907–1937); George V. Denny, Jr. (1937–1951)
- Key people: Lucia Gilbert Runkle, Henry Waters Taft
- Affiliations: The Civic Forum; Economic Club of New York

The League for Political Education was a New York City-based group devoted to providing a forum where people of every rank and station could be educated on the important issues of the day. Founded as a pro-women's suffrage group, the League initially fought for passage of the Nineteenth Amendment to the United States Constitution and provided general education on social and political issues. After opening up their membership to both genders, they later commissioned the building of The Town Hall and sponsored the long-running radio program America's Town Meeting of the Air. The League essentially dissolved in 1938 when it changed its focus to the daily operations of Town Hall.

== History ==
The League was established in 1894, led by Eleanor Butler Sanders, and five other prominent suffragists. Sanders was the League's prime mover and shaker, and hosted the first meeting in her home in New York City. The other attendees in the first meeting included Dr. Mary Putnam Jacobi, Catherine Amor Bennett Abbe (1843–1920), Lucia Gilbert Runkle (1844–1927), Lee Wood Haggin (1856–1934), and Adele Marion Fielde.

Emily James Smith Putnam (the sister-in-law of Mary Putnam Jacobi) was president of the league from 1901 to 1904. Robert Erskine Ely was director from 1907 to 1937.

In 1907 the League formed The Civic Forum, a kindred service designed to foster higher standards of civic responsibility and international goodwill. The same year they helped found the Economic Club of New York, a non-partisan organization for the discussion of economic, social, and industrial problems.

Pioneering Colorado State Senator Helen Ring Robinson spoke before the League in 1913 at New York's Hudson Theatre. According to The New York Times, she said that, "Every city in every state in the country is in need of motherliness, ... telling her audience that it was the womanly woman who was needed in politics, not a creature recreated in the image of man."

Until the mid-1910s the League's offices were at the Berkeley Lyceum on 44th Street. In 1914 the League bought a plot of land on West 49th Street to build a new headquarters, later known as the Societies' Building.

The League's fight for passage of the Nineteenth Amendment led them to commission the building of a meeting space where people of every rank and station could be educated on the important issues of the day. The space, which became The Town Hall, was designed by the renowned architectural firm of McKim, Mead & White, to reflect the democratic principles of the League. To this end, box seats were not included in the theater's design, and every effort was made to ensure that there were no seats with an obstructed view. Town Hall opened in January 1921, a few months after the Nineteenth Amendment had been ratified on August 26, 1920.

Town Hall not only became a meeting place for educational programs, gatherings of activists, and host for controversial speakers (such as the American advocate of birth control, Margaret Sanger, who was arrested and carried off The Town Hall stage on November 13, 1921, for attempting to speak to a mixed-sex audience about contraception), but as one of New York City's premier performance spaces for music, dance, and other performing arts. While the lecture series and courses on political and non-political subjects sponsored by the League continued to be held there, The Town Hall quickly established a reputation as an arts center during the first fifteen years of its existence. It has also had a long association with the promotion of poetry in the United States, which predates Edna St. Vincent Millay's public poetry reading debut at the Hall in 1928.

Henry Waters Taft was president of the League from 1919 to 1935.

George V. Denny, Jr. was associate director of the League in 1935, when he became host of America's Town Meeting of the Air, produced by the League, hosted at Town Hall, and carried on NBC Blue Network. Denny and the League wanted to create a program that would replicate the town meetings that were held in the early days of the United States. Denny was League director from 1937 to 1951; he moderated the program from 1935 to 1952 and had a major role in choosing weekly topics.

The League for Political Education changed its name in 1938 to The Town Hall, Inc. and in 1956 became affiliated with New York University, an association which lasted until 1978.
