= One Night Stand – The Town Hall Concert 1947 =

One Night Stand: Town Hall Concert 1947

Live album by Sarah Vaughan and Lester Young
- Released: 1997
- Recorded: November 8, 1947
- Venue: The Town Hall, New York City
- Label: Blue Note

One Night Stand is a compilation of a concert given on November 8, 1947, at The Town Hall in New York City. The concert featured Sarah Vaughan and Lester Young. The album was released in 1997. Lester Young is a tenor saxophonist who played with the Count Basie Band in the 1930s and 1940s. It is with this group that he first recorded the first copy of "Lester Leaps In" (the first track on One Night Stand) in 1939.

== Track listing ==
1. "Lester Leaps In" – 3:11 Lester Young
2. "Just You, Just Me" – 5:22 Lester Young
3. "Jumpin' With Symphony Sid" – 3:50 Lester Young
4. "Sunday" – 6:20 Lester Young
5. "Don't Blame Me" – 3:47 Sarah Vaughan
6. "My Kinda Love" – 1:47 Sarah Vaughan
7. "I Cover the Waterfront" – 3:36 Sarah Vaughan
8. "I Don't Stand a Ghost of a Chance With You" – 3:54 Sarah Vaughan
9. "Lester's Be Bop Boogie" – 4:53 Sarah Vaughan
10. "These Foolish Things" – 4:56 Lester Young
11. "Movin' With Lester" – 5:51 Lester Young
12. "The Man I Love" – 3:33 Sarah Vaughan
13. "Time After Time" – 2:52 Sarah Vaughan
14. "Mean To Me" – 2:40 Sarah Vaughan
15. "Body and Soul" – 4:06 Sarah Vaughan
16. "I Cried For You" – 3:45 Sarah Vaughan & Lester Young

== Personnel ==
- Sarah Vaughan- vocals
- Lester Young- tenor saxophone
- Shorty McConnell- trumpet
- Sadik Hakim, Sammy Benskin- piano
- Freddie Lacey- guitar
- Rodney Richardson- upright bass
- Roy Haynes- drums

== Sources ==
Gridley, Mark C. Jazz Styles: History & Analysis. 9th edn. N.J.: Prentice Hall, 2006. Print.
