= George V. Denny Jr. =

American radio talk show moderator (1899–1959)

- Born: George Vernon Denny Jr. August 29, 1899; Washington, North Carolina, U.S.
- Died: November 11, 1959 (aged 60); Sharon Hospital, Sharon, Connecticut, U.S.
- Burial place: West Cornwall, Connecticut
- Education: B.S. Commerce, University of North Carolina, 1922; LL.D. degree, Temple University, 1940; Ithaca College, 1951
- Occupations: Radio personality, nonprofit director
- Known for: America's Town Meeting of the Air
- Spouses: Mary Traill Yellott (m. 1924; div. 1943) Jean Sarasy (m. 1944)
- Children: 3
- Awards: Peabody Award, 1945

George V. Denny Jr. (1899–1959) was the long-time moderator of one of radio's first talk shows, America's Town Meeting of the Air, as well as the executive director of the League for Political Education/Town Hall, which produced the program. Denny moderated America's Town Meeting of the Air from 1935 to 1952 and had a major role in choosing weekly topics.

== Biography ==
=== Early life and education ===
Denny was born August 29, 1899, in Washington, North Carolina, graduating from the University of North Carolina (UNC) in 1922.

=== Early career and the League for Political Education ===
Denny was a professor of drama production at UNC from 1924–1926, and then moved to New York, working as an actor on Broadway for one season. He managed the W. B. Feakins lecture bureau for a year, and then became the director of Columbia University's Institute of Arts and Sciences from 1928–1930.

In 1931, Denny became the associate director of the League for Political Education, becoming full director in 1937.

=== America's Town Meeting of the Air ===
In his role, by 1935 Denny worried that an uninformed public was bad for democracy; and that American society had become so polarized that the average person didn't listen to other points of view. His goal was to create a new kind of educational program, one that would be entertaining as well as mentally challenging, while exposing listeners to various perspectives on the issues of the day. He wanted to create a program that would replicate the town meetings that were held in the early days of the United States. He believed that a radio town meeting could enhance the public's interest in current events. Explaining the rationale behind a radio town meeting, Denny wrote that it was "... a device which is designed to attract [the average American's] attention and stimulate his [sic] interest in the complex economic, social and political problems which he must have a hand in solving."

Originally carried by the NBC Blue Network, America's Town Meeting of the Air began as a six-week experiment, and NBC itself didn't expect much from it. Broadcast live from New York City's Town Hall (the League for Political Education's headquarters), America's Town Meeting of the Air debuted on Thursday May 30, 1935, and only 18 of NBC's affiliates carried it. The topic for that first show was "Which Way America: Fascism, Communism, Socialism or Democracy?"

As Denny had hoped, listeners not only enjoyed hearing famous newsmakers engaging in discussion but they also enjoyed hearing members of the audience challenging these newsmakers. It wasn't long before Denny was receiving fan mail: much to his surprise, his first broadcast received about 3,000 letters. By the 1937-8 season, mail averaged between 2,000 and 4,000 letters a week, an amazing number for an educational program. It also inspired listeners to form "listener clubs," where members would listen as a group and then discuss the topic themselves.

America's Town Meeting became so popular in the public discourse that during the late 1930s and into the early 40s, Denny wrote a monthly column for Current History magazine, in which he gave summaries of the major points made by some of his Town Meeting guests, and then gave readers news quizzes. And educators found it so useful that Denny and NBC put program listings and what the speakers had said into booklet form, which was disseminated to public school civics teachers.

Over the years, America's Town Meeting became known for its interesting guests, many of whom were important newsmakers. Denny did not shy away from controversy: his panelists included Socialist presidential candidate Norman Thomas, American Communist Party leader Earl Browder, and civil libertarian Morris Ernst.

The topics were meant to inspire discussion, and Denny tried to select subjects that would get people talking long after the show was over. Among them were discussions about whether America truly had freedom of the press (and whether censorship was sometimes necessary); whether the United States should enter World War II or remain neutral; and why the United States public schools weren't doing a better job.

But during World War II, Denny repeatedly encountered what he had most sought to avoid: angry audience members who didn't want to listen to other viewpoints and who wanted to criticize, rather than debate. Worse still, some audience members expressed isolationist and anti-Semitic views. Denny struggled to maintain the show's openness and objectivity, but it became increasingly difficult to do so.

The 1930s were definitely the heyday of America's Town Meeting, although it remained on the air throughout the 1940s and sometimes still inspired the kinds of passionate discussions Denny had hoped for. But Town Meeting underwent a number of time changes during the 1940s. Some were the result of changes at NBC — the network that had been called the NBC Blue Network was sold in 1943, and it first became known as the "Blue Network," and then was re-named the American Broadcasting Company in late 1945. Some of the programs on the new network were shifted around, and not only did Town Meeting get a new timeslot—it was moved from 9:30pm to 8:30pm—but by 1944, it even got a sponsor—Reader's Digest. At times, the show was 60 minutes, sometimes 45 minutes and sometimes only a half-hour. And when television came along, interest in Denny's radio program gradually faded. Denny resigned his position at the League for Political Education (then known as Town Hall, Inc.) in 1951; by 1952, he had been replaced as moderator — the show was finally canceled on July 1, 1956.

=== Later life and death ===
Denny, who continued to believe in educational media, joined an organization that planned international seminars, and he hoped to create an international version of Town Meeting. He died of a cerebral hemorrhage on November 11, 1959, at the age of 60.

== Personal life ==
Denny was married to Mary Traill Yellott from June 12, 1924, until their divorce on September 1, 1943. They had three children.

In April 1944, he married the former Jean Sarasy; they remained married until his death.
