= Eleanor Butler Sanders =

American suffragist and socialite

- Born: Eleanor Rudd Butler; May 16, 1849; United States
- Died: August 5, 1905 (aged 56); United States
- Resting place: Green-Wood Cemetery
- Spouse: Henry Martin Sanders
- Children: 1
- Parents: Theron Rudd Butler (father); Maria E. Miller Butler (mother)

Eleanor "Ella" Butler Sanders (1849 – 1905) was an American suffragist, and socialite. She founded the League for Political Education. Vassar College has a building named after her.

== Biography ==
She was born with the name Eleanor Rudd Butler, on May 16, 1849. Her parents were Maria E. Miller (1827–1910) and Theron Rudd Butler (1813–1884), an art collector and former President of the Sixth Avenue Railroad Company. She was the great aunt to Eleanor Butler Roosevelt. Eleanor Rudd Butler married Dr. Henry Martin Sanders, a Baptist pastor, and a board of trustees of Vassar College from 1895 until his death in 1921.

In 1892, Eleanor Sanders presented a scholarship at a fundraiser for Hampton University, a school that was primarily serving African American and Native American students at the time.

In November 1894, Sanders founded the League for Political Education in her living room on 433 Fifth Avenue in New York City, where she hosted the first group meeting with five other people. The other attendees in the first meeting included Dr. Mary Putnam Jacobi, Catherine Amor Bennett Abbe (1843–1920), Lucia Gilbert Runkle (1844–1927), Lee Wood Haggin (1856–1934), and Adele Marion Fielde. The League initially fought for passage of the Nineteenth Amendment to the United States Constitution and provided general education on social and political issues. She stayed very active in the leadership of the organization until her death on August 5, 1905.

In 1909, her widower, Henry Martin Sanders donated to Vassar College the Sanders Chemical Laboratory, as a dedication to his late wife. Vassar College was the first women's school in the United States to have a full laboratory.
