= Baker Overstreet =

Baker Overstreet (born 1981) is an artist based in Brooklyn.

Overstreet was born in Augusta, Georgia. His paintings describe patterns, symbols, figures and fictional spaces. His work makes reference to folk and primitive art.

He received his Master of Fine Arts from Yale University in 2006.

== Selected exhibitions ==
2006

- Escape From New York, Curators Without Borders, Berlin
- Volta Art Fair, Basel, Switzerland
- Smoke and Mirrors, China Art Objects, Los Angeles
- Mary Pauline Gallery, Augusta

2007

- Gimme a little Sign, Sister, Los Angeles, California
- Fredericks & Freiser, The Armory Show, New York

2008

- Unnamable Things, Artspace, New Haven, Connecticut

2009

- Franklin Art Works, Minneapolis
