= Bonaro W. Overstreet =

American author

- Born: October 30, 1902; Geyserville, California, US
- Died: September 3, 1985 (aged 82); Arlington County, Virginia, US
- Occupations: Author, poet, psychologist, and lecturer
- Spouse: Harry Allen Overstreet

Bonaro Wilkinson Overstreet (30 October 1902 – 3 September 1985) was an American author, poet, psychologist, and lecturer. With her husband, Harry Allen Overstreet, she lectured widely and co-wrote a number of books.

== Early life and education ==
Bonaro Wilkinson was born in Geyserville, California on 30 October 1902. She was the youngest of three children born to Edward and Margaret Elizabeth Bonar Wilkinson, and received her elementary and high school education in Geyserville. She developed a passion for poetry while still a teenager.

Wilkinson won a scholarship to the University of California, Berkeley, where she majored in English and minored in Astronomy. She graduated in 1925 with a Bachelor of Arts. She then earned her teacher's certificate, going on to teach at Kern County Union High School in Bakersfield, California from 1926 to 1929.

Between 1929 and 1930, she pursued graduate studies in psychology at Columbia University, New York City, and received her master's degree in 1931. In New York, she was a student of Dr. Harry Allen Overstreet, who she would later marry. She published her first book, The Poetic Way of Release, in 1931.

In 1932, she married Harry Allen Overstreet, then head of the Department of Philosophy and Psychology at the City College of New York. He was 27 years her senior.

Following marriage, Overstreet lived in New York City, teaching creative writing from 1933 to 1937. She published her first volume of poetry, Footsteps on the Earth, in 1934. This was followed in 1938 by Search for a Self, focusing on self-understanding - to be a recurring theme in the Overstreets' later collaborative works.

Following Harry's retirement from CCNY in 1939, the couple settled in California.

== Career ==
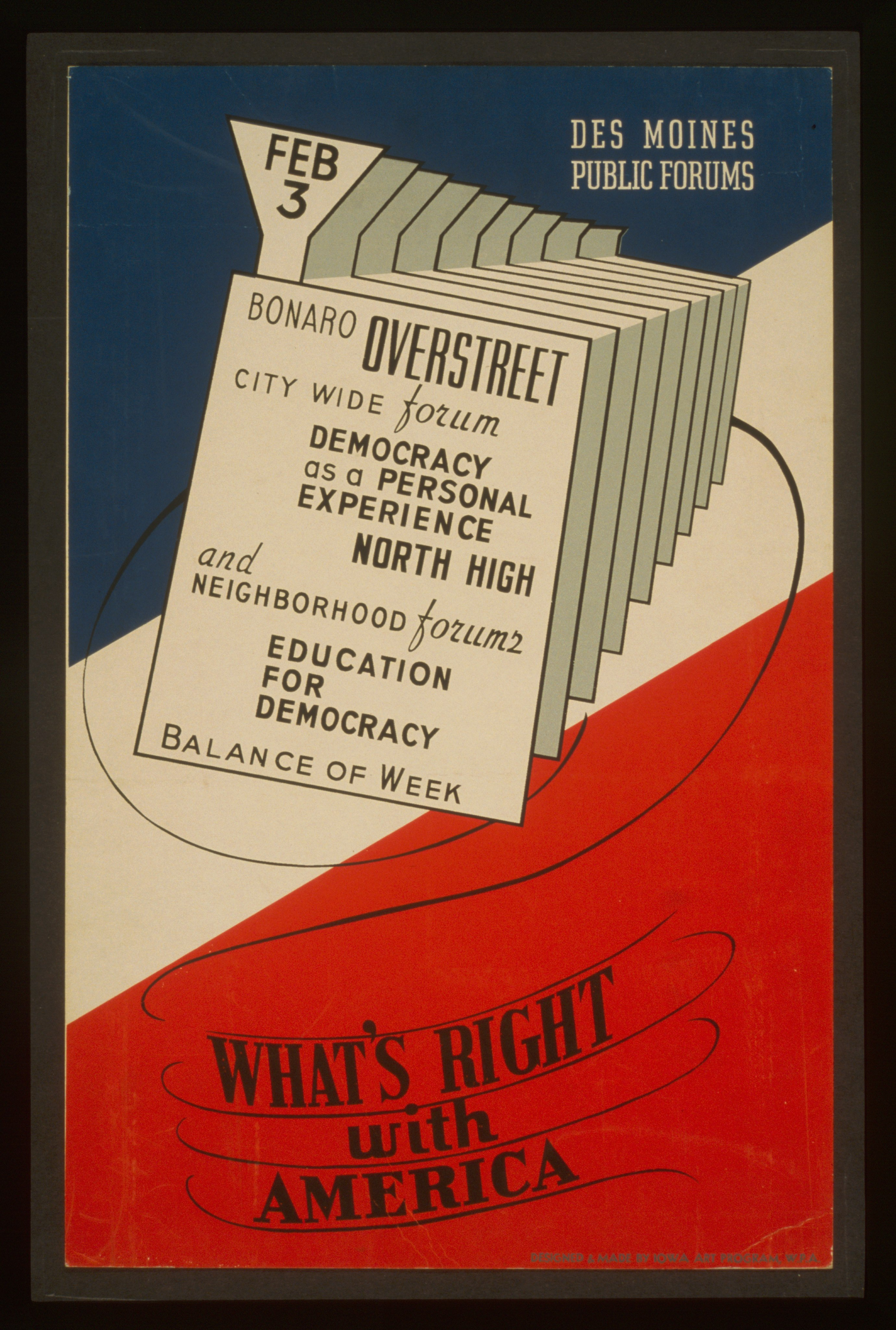
Poster announcing public forums with Bonaro Overstreet; citywide forum discussing "democracy as a personal experience", 1941

Alongside her husband, Bonaro Overstreet lectured on adult education, mental health, social psychology, and political philosophy. They developed a lecturing style called the "Overstreet colloquium," resembling a conversation between husband and wife, rather than a typical lecture. In a 1956 interview, the Overstreets described themselves as "middlemen and itinerant lecturers", helping to translate the ideas of psychologists and scientists into language and concepts applicable to everyday life. Their co-authored column for The Washington Post, called "Making Life Make Sense", epitomized this.

The couple were known as "outspoken defenders of civil liberties and academic freedom", and co-wrote works including The Mind Alive, Leaders for Adult Education, What We Must Know About Communism, and The Strange Tactics of Extremism. In addition to selling well in the US, their books were translated into many other languages.

Overstreet also wrote several volumes of poetry, and books as Courage for Crisis and How to Stay Alive All of Your Life. She summed up her personal philosophy as:

Self-respect and respect for others go together... I do not believe it is possible, except superficially, to think well of ourselves and ill of our human fellows, or to think well of them and ill of ourselves.

In a 1990 dissertation, Brigid Byrne Dorman concluded that Overstreet's significant contribution to adult education was in broadening its depth "as an advocate of knowing oneself and acting responsibly in the context of democratic responsibility". She was described in Edward R. Murrow's What I Believe as bringing "a warm imagination and a disciplined mind to the service of humanity".

Overstreet was a member of the Citizens Committee for a Free Cuba, set up in 1963.

== Later years and death ==
Harry Overstreet died in 1970. Bonaro spent the last three decades of her life in Falls Church, Virginia. Overstreet continued lecturing until the year before her death, at 82 years old, in a nursing home in Arlington County, Virginia.
