= Harry Allen Overstreet =

American philosopher (1875–1970)

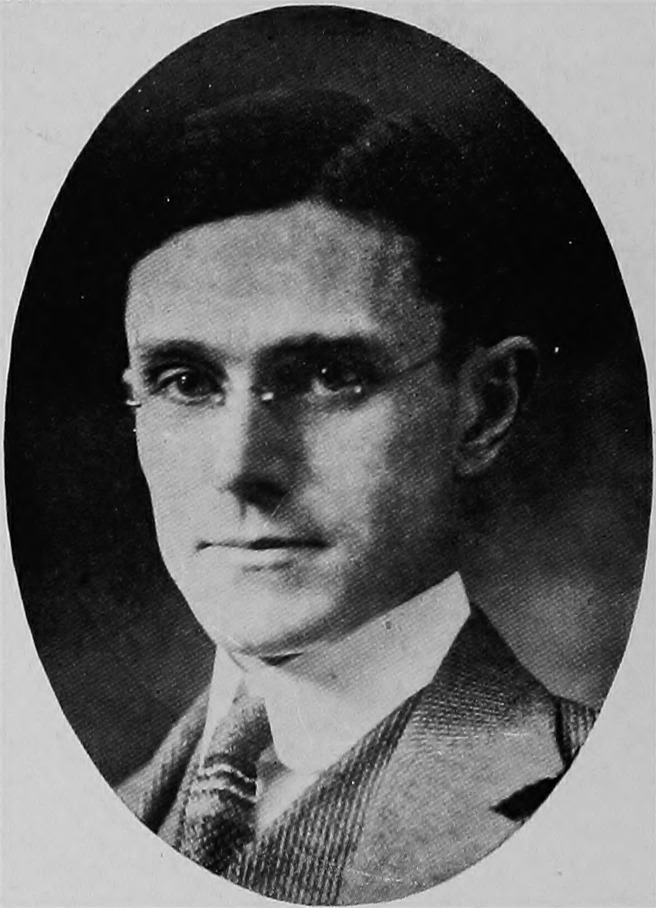
Harry Allen Overstreet, 1914

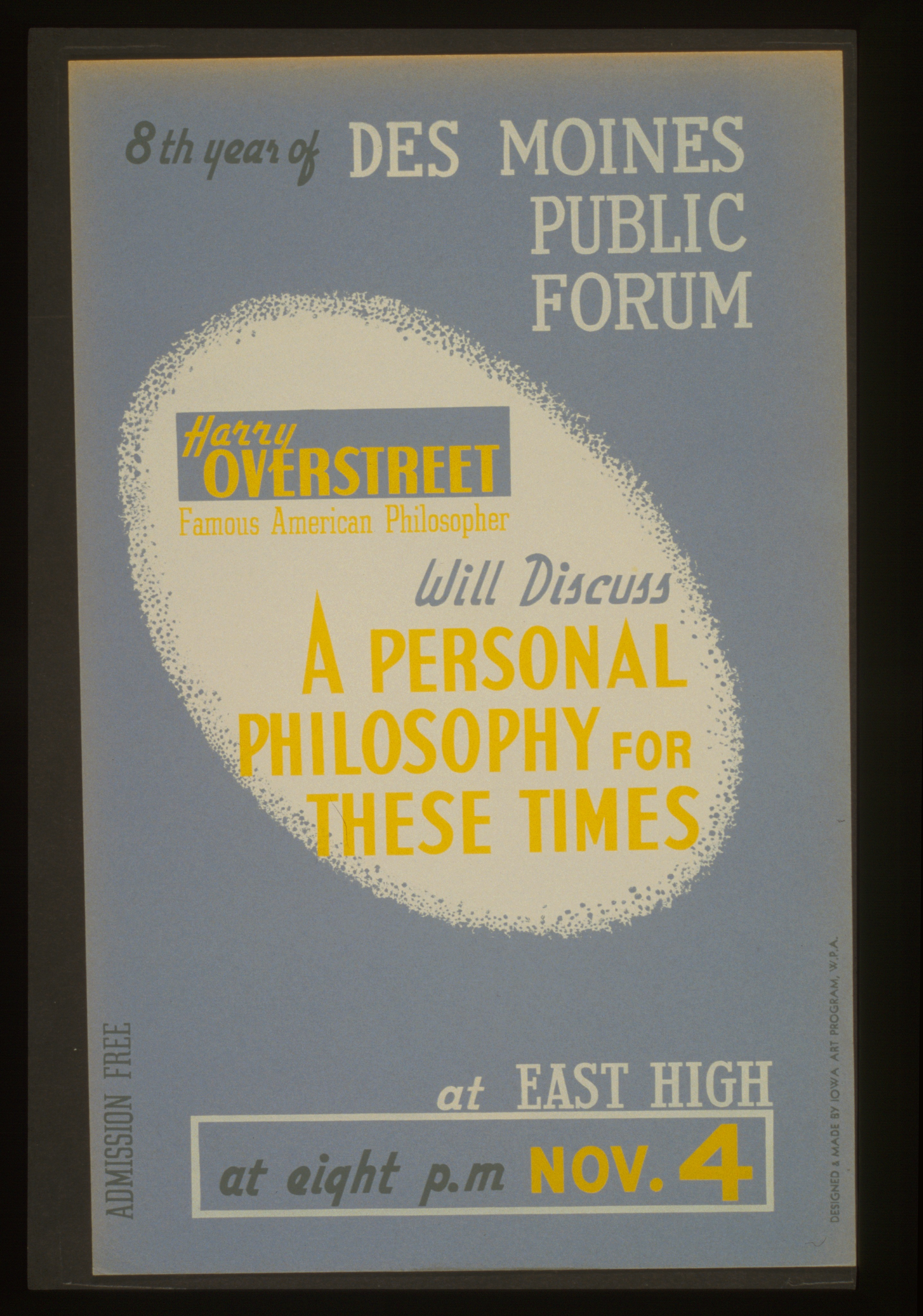
WPA poster for lecture by Harry Overstreet

Harry Allen Overstreet (October 25, 1875 – August 17, 1970) was an American writer and lecturer, and a popular author on modern psychology and sociology. His 1949 book, The Mature Mind, was a substantial best-seller that sold over 500,000 copies by 1952.

Overstreet was born in San Francisco, California, on 25 October 1875. He attended the University of California receiving his B.A. degree in 1899. He taught at Berkeley until 1911. From 1911 to 1936, he was chair of Department of Philosophy and Psychology at City College of New York. Overstreet also taught in the continuing education program of the New School for Social Research. He lectured and worked frequently with his second wife, Bonaro Overstreet.

== Published works ==
- Overstreet, H. A. 1925. Influencing human behavior. New York: W.W. Norton.
- Overstreet, H. A. 1927. About ourselves: psychology for normal people. New York: W.W. Norton & Co.
- Overstreet, H. A. 1931. The enduring quest, a search for a philosophy of life. New York: W.W. Norton & Company, Inc.
- Overstreet, H. A. 1933. We move in new directions. New York: W.W. Norton.
- Overstreet, H. A., and Bonaro W. Overstreet. 1938. Town meeting comes to town. New York: Harper & Brothers.
- Overstreet, H. A. 1939 Let Me Think. Macmillan Company
- Overstreet, H. A., and Bonaro W. Overstreet. 1941. Leaders for adult education. New York: American Association for Adult Education.
- Overstreet, H. A. 1941. Our free minds. New York: W.W. Norton & Company, Inc.
- Overstreet, H. A. 1949. The mature mind. New York: W. W. Norton.
- Overstreet, H. A. 1952. The Great Enterprise Relating Ourselves To Our World. New York: W. W. Norton.
- Overstreet, H.A.and Bonaro. 1964. The strange tactics of extremism. New York: W.W. Norton & Company. Inc. Canada: George J. McLeod Limited, Toronto.
- Overstreet, H. A. 1969. A guide to civilized leisure. Freeport, N.Y.: Books for Libraries Press.
