= Appleton family =

American political, religious and mercantile family

Appleton Appulton
- Political, religious, mercantile
- Country: England; United States
- Current region: United States
- Etymology: Apple garden
- Origin: Little Waldingfield, Babergh District, Suffolk, England

The Appleton family is an American political, religious and mercantile family.

== Family tree ==
- Samuel Appleton (1586–1670), who emigrated to Ipswich, Massachusetts around 1636. Married (1) 1616: Judith Everard; (2) 1670: Martha
  - Martha Appleton (1620–1659) ∞ Richard Jacob (d.1672)
  - John Appleton (1622–1699) ∞ Priscilla Glover (d. 1698)
    - John Appleton (1652–1739) ∞ Elizabeth Rogers (d. 1754)
      - Daniel Appleton (1692–1762)
      - Nathaniel Appleton (1693–1784)
        - Nathaniel Appleton Jr. (1731–1798)
          - Nathaniel Walker Appleton (1755–1795)
            - Nathaniel Walker Appleton Jr. (1783–1848)
              - Charles Tilden Appleton (1809–1859)
              - William Channing Appleton (1812–1892)
            - Charles Henderson Appleton (1784–1831)
              - Charles Dawes Appleton (1810–1886)
              - George Dawes Appleton (1818–1890)
      - Margaret Appleton (1701–1740) ∞ Edward Holyoke (d. 1769)
    - Priscilla (1657–1743) ∞ 1684: Rev. Joseph Capen (1658–1725)
  - Samuel Appleton (1624/6–1696) ∞ (1) 1651: Hannah Paine; (2) Mary Oliver (1646–1698)
    - Isaac Appleton (1664–1747) ∞ Priscilla Baker
      - Isaac Appleton (1704–1794) ∞ Elizabeth Sawyer (1709–1785)
        - Isaac Appleton (1731–1806) ∞ Mary Adams (1741–1827)
          - Isaac Appleton (1762–1853)
          - Samuel Appleton (1766–1853) ∞ 1799: Mary Gore
          - Nathan Appleton (1779–1861) ∞ (1) 1806: Maria Theresa Gold; (2) 1839: Harriet Coffin Sumner
            - Thomas Gold Appleton (1812–1884)
            - Mary "Molly" Appleton (b. 1813) ∞ Robert James Mackintosh (1806-1864)
              - Ronald Mackintosh
            - Charles Sedgwick Appleton (1815–1835)
            - Frances "Fanny" Elizabeth Appleton (1819–1861) ∞ 1843: Henry Wadsworth Longfellow (1807–1882)
              - Charles Appleton Longfellow (1844–1893)
              - Ernest Wadsworth Longfellow (1845–1921) ∞ 1868: Harriet "Hattie" Spelman
              - Fanny Longfellow (1847–1848)
              - Alice Mary Longfellow (1850–1928)
              - Edith Longfellow (1853–1915) ∞ Richard Henry Dana III (1851–1931)
              - Anne Allegra Longfellow (1855–1934)
            - George William Appleton (1826–1827)
            - William Sumner Appleton (1840–1903) ∞ Edith Stuart (d. 1892)
              - William Sumner Appleton Jr. (1874–1947)
            - Harriet Sumner Appleton (1841–1923) ∞ Greely S. Curtis (1830–1897)
            - Nathan Appleton Jr. (1843–1906)
        - Francis Appleton (1733–1819) ∞ Elizabeth Hubbard (1730–1815)
          - John Appleton (1763–1849) ∞ Elizabeth Peabody (d. 1809)
            - John Appleton (judge) (b. 1804) ∞ 1834: Sarah Newcomb
              - John Francis Appleton (1838–1870)
            - Elvira Appleton (1804–1852) ∞ George S. Gibson
          - Mary Appleton (1764–1820)
          - Elizabeth Appleton (1767–1850)
          - Rev. Jesse Appleton (1772–1819) ∞ Elizabeth Means (1779–1844)
            - Mary Means Appleton (1801–1883) ∞ John Aiken (1797–1867)
              - William Appleton Aiken (1833–1929) ∞ Eliza Coit Buckingham (1838–1924)
              - Mary Appleton Aiken ∞ Francis H. Snow (1840–1908)
            - Frances Appleton (1804–1839) ∞ Alpheus Spring Packard Sr. (1798–1884)
              - William Alfred Packard (1830–1909)
              - Alpheus Spring Packard Jr. (1839–1905)
            - Jane Means Appleton (1806–1863) ∞ U.S. President Franklin Pierce (1804–1869)
              - Franklin Pierce Jr. (1836–1836)
              - Franklin "Frank" Robert Pierce (1839–1843)
              - Benjamin Pierce (1841–1853)
            - William Appleton (1808–1830)
            - John Appleton (1814–1817)
        - Rev. Joseph Appleton (1751–1795)
          - William Appleton (1786–1862) ∞ Mary Ann Cutler (1794-1860)
            - William Sullivan Appleton (1815–1836)
            - James Amory Appleton (1818–1843) ∞ Mary Ellen Lyman (1819–1875)
            - Sarah Elizabeth Appleton (1822–1891) ∞ Amos Adams Lawrence (1814–1886)
            - Francis Henry Appleton (1823–1854) ∞ Georgiana Crowninshield Silsbee (1824–1901)
            - William Joseph Warren Appleton (1825–1877) ∞ Emily Warren (1818–1905)
              - Emily Appleton Beebe (b. 1846) ∞ 1869: J. Arthur Beebe (d. 1911?)
              - William Appleton Jr. (b. 1848)
              - Susan Warren Appleton (1848–1872)
            - Edward H. Appleton (1827–1827)
            - Harriet Cutler Appleton (1828–1857) ∞ Franklin Gordon Dexter (1824–1903)
            - Hetty Sullivan Appleton (1831–1901) ∞ Thomas Jefferson Coolidge (1831–1920)
            - Charles Hook Appleton (1833–1874) ∞ Isabella Mason (1835–1869)
        - Samuel Appleton (1738–1819) ∞ Mary White (d. 1834)
          - Mary Appleton (1773–1829) ∞ Amos Sawyer (d. 1851)
          - John White Appleton (1780–1862) ∞ (1) 1806: Sarah Porter (d. 1809); (2) 1810: Sophia Porter (d. 1860)
            - Elisha William Appleton (b. 1810) ∞ 1837: Martha Wylly
              - John Howard Appleton (1844–1930)
            - Sarah Porter Appleton (b. 1812) ∞ 1845: John Goodenow
            - John Appleton (1815–1864)
            - Abby Eliza Appleton (b. 1882) ∞ 1841: George Freeman Emery
          - Joanna Appleton ∞ (1) Samuel Safford (d. 1816); (2) Eben Dodge (d. 1872)
          - James Appleton (1785–1862) ∞ 1807: Sarah Fuller (1787–1872)
            - Samuel Gilman Appleton (1808–1873) ∞ 1829: Sarah Gardiner
            - Sarah Fuller Appleton (1811–1884) ∞ 1833: Rev. Stephen Caldwell Millett
            - James Appleton (1813–1884) ∞ 1842: Sarah Bristol Edwards
            - Mary White Appleton (1815–1905)
            - Elizabeth Putnam Appleton (1818–1897) ∞ 1845: Shelton L. Hall
            - Joanna Dodge Appleton (1821–1870) ∞ 1843: Peyton R. Morgan
            - Hannah Fuller Appleton (1823–1903) ∞ Robert Helyer Thayer (1820–1888)
            - Daniel Fuller Appleton (1826–1904) ∞ (1) Julia Randall (d. 1886); ∞ (2) 1889: Susan Cowles
              - Francis Randall Appleton (1854–1929)
            - Harriette Hooper Appleton (1828–1905) ∞ 1849: Rev. John Cotton Smith
            - Anna Whittemore Appleton (1831–) ∞ Dr. Charles H. Osgood
    - Oliver Appleton (1676–1760) ∞ Sarah Perkins (1677–1770)
      - Sarah Appleton (1709–1798) ∞ (1) 1727: Benjamin Swain; (2) 1752: Benjamin Wyman (d.1774)
      - Hannah Appleton (b. 1711) ∞ 1730: Thomas Swain
      - Samuel Appleton (1710–1780) ∞ (1) 1736: Mary Phillips (d. 1737); (2) 1739: Mary Stevens; (3) 1743: Mary Russell (1715–1803)
        - Mary (1746–1830) ∞ 1769 Moses Gale (d. 1827)
        - Daniel Appleton (1750–1828) ∞ Lydia Ela (1747–1826)
          - Daniel Appleton (1785–1849) ∞ 1813: Hannah Adams (1791–1859)
            - William Henry Appleton (1814–1899) ∞ 1844: Mary Moody Worthen (1824–1884)
              - William Worthen Appleton (1845–1924) ∞ Anna Debois Sargent (1845–1908)
                - William Henry Appleton (1866–1951)
              - Kate Appleton (1848–1873) ∞ 1872: Hobart Seymour Geary (1838–1918)
              - Mary Appleton (d. 1934)
              - Henry Cozzens Appleton (1863–1925) ∞ Dora Threlkeld (1847–1927)
            - Maria Louisa Appleton (b. 1815) ∞ James E. Cooley (1802–1882)
            - John Adams Appleton (1817–1881)
            - Charles Horatio Appleton (1819–1820)
            - George Swett Appleton (1821–1878) ∞ 1847: Caroline Osgood
              - Ellina Appleton (b. 1848) ∞ 1867: William A. Fraser
              - Walter Stone Appleton (b. 1849) ∞ Annie P. Beach
              - Emma Appleton (b. 1852) ∞ Madan
              - George Swett Appleton (1854–1886)
              - Francis Appleton (b. 1856)
            - Daniel Sidney Appleton (1824–1890) ∞ Melvina W. Marshall (d. 1878)
            - Samuel Frances Appleton (1826–1883)
            - Sarah Emeline Appleton (1829–1861) ∞ Leopold Bossange
  - Sarah (1629–1714) ∞ Rev. Samuel Phillips (d. 1696)
  - Judith (1634–1659) ∞ 1657: Samuel Rogers (d. 1693)

== Arms ==
Coat of arms of Appleton family

Crest
An elephant's head couped sable, tusked and eared or; round the trunk a serpent entering the mouth vert
Escutcheon
Argent, a fess sable between three apples gules, slipped and leaved vert
Motto
Difficiles sed fructuose (Difficult but fruitful)
