= McCollom Building =

Coordinates: 42°53′36″N 71°40′24″W

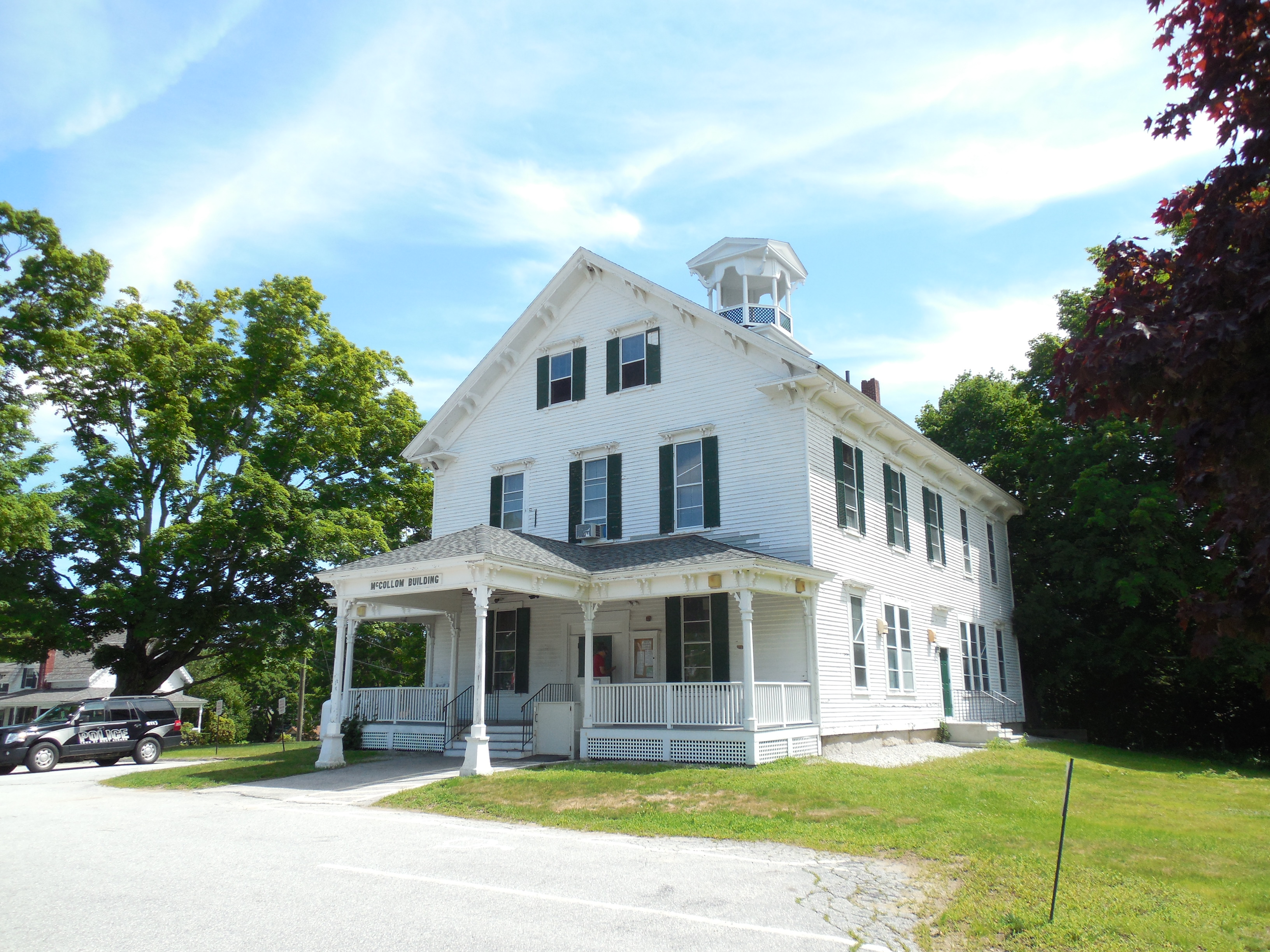
The McCollom Building

The McCollom Building is a two-story building in the middle of the town of Mont Vernon, New Hampshire. It was built in 1853 as a private school and over the decades has housed two different private preparatory schools, a public school, and most recently town offices.

== History ==
In 1848 the town voted to build a new schoolhouse for higher education and the "Appleton Academy" was opened in 1850 in a building across the street from the McCollom Building.

The name of Appleton seems to have been given in the hope of getting financial support from the Appleton family, particularly William Appleton of Boston, whose mother had lived in Mont Vernon with her daughters until her death in 1842, and his cousin Samuel Appleton, a notable philanthropist. William Appleton eventually gave the school a library worth $700, equivalent to $26,457 in 2024, while Samuel gave $500 towards the cost of the new building, the biggest single donation, equivalent to $18,898 in 2024. In 1855, William gave another $100.

By the school's third year, the number of students had risen to 101, leading to the need for a bigger and better building. What is now the McCollom Building was erected in 1853, forty feet by sixty, three stories, with an upstairs school hall.

In 1858, a twelve-page Catalogue of Officers and Students of the Appleton Academy, Mont Vernon, N.H. was published.

In 1860, soon after graduating from Dartmouth College, Cecil Bancroft (1839–1901) was appointed as Principal of the school, where he stayed until 1864, leaving to marry Frances A. Kittredge, one of his students. He went on to be appointed as Principal of Phillips Academy Andover in 1873.

=== McCollom Institute ===
By 1871, attendance had fallen to only thirty-six. In that year, George W. McCollom (1814–1878) of New York City, a rich man born on a farm near Mont Vernon, gave the school $10,000 (equivalent to $262,472 in 2024) in memory of his late wife, Mary Ann Stevens, a niece of William Appleton. The school was renamed the McCollom Institute. A colonnaded porch and porte-cochère were added to the building and by 1873, attendance was back up to eighty-six, with an average student age of eighteen.

In April, 1879, the length of the Fall and Winter terms was fixed at thirteen weeks each, leaving the Spring term at twelve weeks, which made the school year two weeks longer.

In 1892, with numbers falling again, one of the school's rooms was put into use as Mont Vernon's first public library.

Through the 1890s there were several changes of teachers and schoolmasters as interest in "country academies" fell out of favor. There was no school from 1900 to 1901. By 1906, the number of students had fallen to eleven, partly reflecting a decline the population of rural New England towns like Mont Vernon as farms moved to the Midwest, and trustees decided to discontinue the school.

The book History of Mont Vernon (1907), says

For some years the permanent population of the town had been diminishing, and the surrounding towns, also growing smaller, were sending their children to High schools in towns which were large enough to support them. The regular fitting schools had, by their superior advantages, drawn many of the class that formerly came to Mont Vernon, and McCollom Institute could no longer compete in the work.

=== Stearns School ===
In 1906, Arthur Stearns, assistant headmaster of the Lakewood, N.J., school for boys, established a boarding school for both sexes in the building. Stearns School stopped accepting girls in 1910. It operated as a boarding prep school through 1937, eventually owning several town buildings as dormitories, a 9-hole golf course, and Stearns Pond, which was used for ice hockey. Enrollment peaked at 47 pupils, but according to the 1958 edition of the "History of Mont Vernon," it declined sharply after the Wall Street Crash of 1929. Without an endowment fund to make up for lost tuition, the history said, "continued operation became impossible and closure was enforced in September, 1937."

The building was largely unused until 1947, when the trustees let the town use it for elementary school overflow from Central School, the last of what had once been five public school houses in town. In 1970 the Mont Vernon Village School was built and grades 4-6 move there. In 1990 the remaining grades moved to the Village School and the McCollom Building was given to the town of Mont Vernon, at which time it adopted the current name. As of 2020 it holds the clerks office and police department.
