= John Rudolph Sutermeister =

American poet

- Born: March 16, 1803; Curaçao
- Died: January 16, 1826 (aged 22); New York City, U.S.
- Occupations: Lawyer, poet

John Rudolph Sutermeister (March 16, 1803 – January 16, 1826) was an American jurist and poet.

== Life ==
Sutermeister was baptized at a Lutheran church in Curaçao, his birthplace on 17 April 1803. Upon arrival in Rhinebeck around 1812 he studied at the Lutheran church. In 1817 he was sent to boarding school in Cooperstown, New York. After studying alternately at the Rhinebeck Hartwick Academy, he studied law at Rhinebeck. In 1824, he began a tour through the western part of the state of New York to find a suitable location to establish himself as a lawyer. He settled in the same year in Syracuse, New York. However, the legal profession did not suit him and he then worked briefly as editor of the Syracuse Gazette. In July 1825 he left Syracuse to move to New York City where his friends had found a suitable and lucrative position for him. However, this was short-lived because six months later he died.

John made himself a poet deserving in his short life.

== Work ==
In 1824 Sutermeister wrote an Ode to Linnæus, which was also published in the American Farmer

The same year, he wrote the poem To a Humming Bird, which was published in John Keese's The Poets of America as well as in Anthony Benezet Cleveland's Studies in Poetry and Prose

A year later, he wrote The Garden; his poems were published as Minor Poems (including A Contrasted Picture, The Lament (or A Lament), Faded Hours (The Careless Lover's Adieu) and in the Syracuse Gazette.

=== Poems (selection) ===
- Ode to Linnæus. Celebration at Flushing, of the Birth-Day of Linnaeus. New-York Branch of the Linnaean Society of Paris, 1824, p. 14 (description at the Digital Public Library of America)

Published also in: American Farmer, no. 21, vol. 6, Baltimore, 13 August 1824, p. 161 (online)

- To a Humming Bird. (originally appeared in 1824) (Excerpt)

Published in: John Keese: The Poets of America, volume 1, S. Colman, 1840, p. 124-125.
And in: A. B. Cleveland: Studies in Poetry and Prose: Consisting of Selections Principally from American Writers, and Designed for the Highest Class in Schools. W. and J. Neal, 1832, p. 360.

- The Garden. (1825)
- Minor Poems.
- A Contrasted Picture. (John Rudolph Sutermeister at the Internet Archive, p. 72-73.)
- The Lament or A Lament. (Digitalized by Gutenberg.org, including biographical background) (John Rudolph Sutermeister at the Internet Archive, p. 73-74.)
- Faded Hours. (John Rudolph Sutermeister at the Internet Archive, p. 74-75.) (Rufus Wilmot Griswold: The Poets and Poetry of America: To the Middle of the Nineteenth Century. A. Hart, 1852, p. 545.)
- The Careless Lover's Adieu

== Bibliography and Weblinks ==
- Samuel Kettell: Specimens of American poetry: with critical and biographical notices, in three volumes. Boston: S.G. Goodrich, 1829, p. 71-75. John Rudolph Sutermeister at the Internet Archive
- Short biography, caribbean genealogy
