= Emily Appleton =

Emily Appleton may refer to:

- Emily Appleton (philanthropist) (1818–1905), an American philanthropist and animal welfare activist from Boston
- Emily Appleton (tennis) (born 1999), a British tennis player
