= Senator Cooley =

Senator Cooley may refer to:

- James E. Cooley (1802–1882), New York State Senate
- Wes Cooley (1932–2015), Oregon State Senate
