= Daniel Appleton =

American publisher (1785–1849)

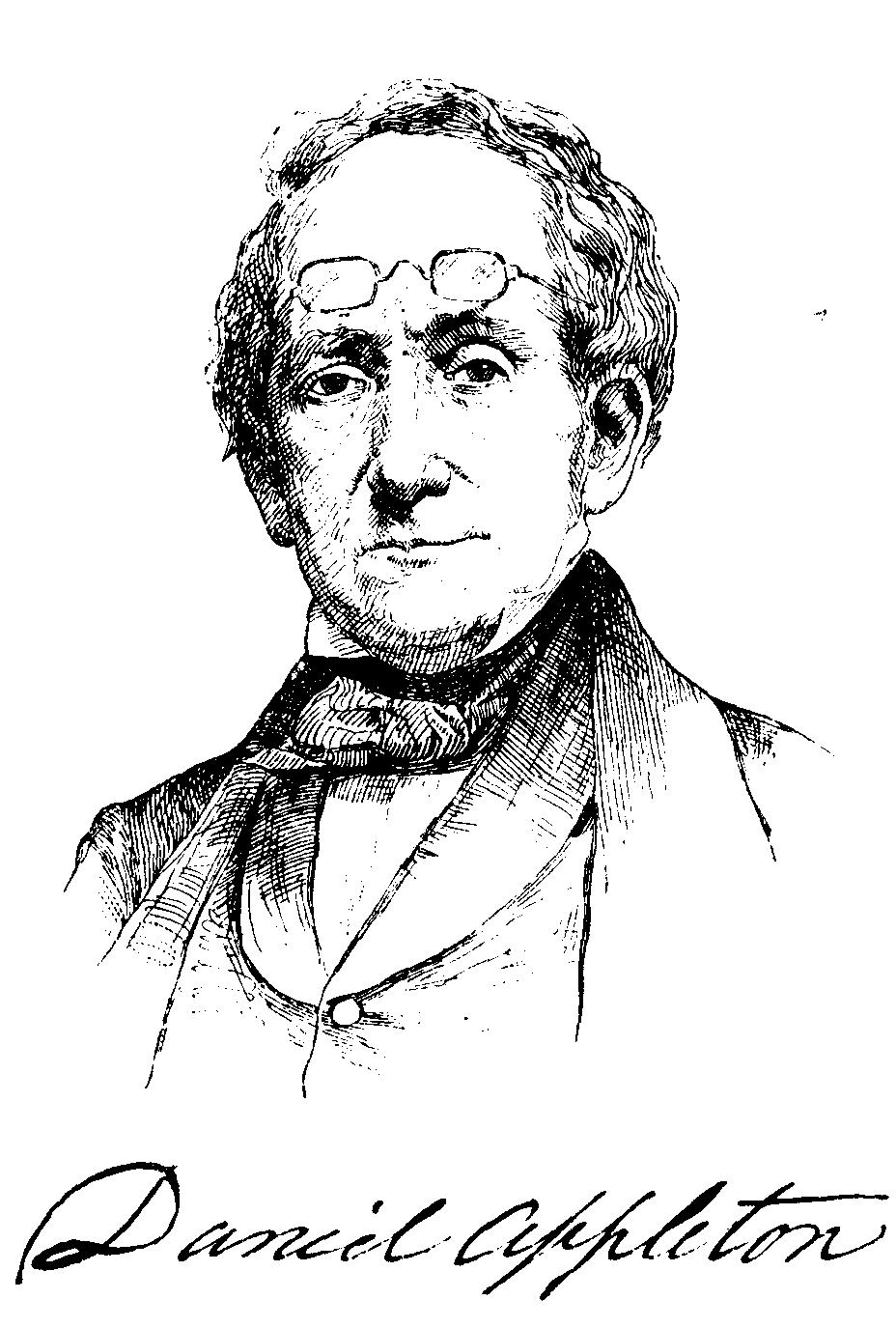
- Born: December 10, 1785; Haverhill, Massachusetts, U.S.
- Died: March 27, 1849 (aged 63); New York City, New York U.S.
- Occupation: Publisher
- Spouse: Hannah Adams (1813–1849)
- Children: 8, including William and George
- Parents: Daniel Appleton; Lydia Ela
- Relatives: Appleton family

Daniel Appleton (December 10, 1785 – March 27, 1849) was an American publisher who founded D. Appleton & Co.

== Early life ==
Daniel Appleton was born on December 10, 1785, in Haverhill, Massachusetts. He was the son of Daniel Appleton (1750–1828) and Lydia (née Ela) Appleton (1747–1826).

== Career ==
After a few years of schooling, he started a general store in Haverill. He moved to Boston and had his business office at 21 Broad Street, where he sold dry-goods imported from England. Finally, in 1825, he moved to New York City where he gradually combined the importing of books with the dry-goods trade. The book department was placed in charge of William Henry Appleton, his eldest son.

Later, he moved to Clinton Hall, Beekman Street, and devoted himself to the importation and sales of books, abandoning his dry-goods business. He published his first book in 1831. He gradually diversified. In 1841, he began offering children's books. In 1845, he began sending books to Latin America which—despite his lack of contacts—turned out to be a good market for him due to its recent independence from Spain. His business in that region was enduring and profitable. In 1847, he started offering travel literature.

The firm which he established in New York City became known as D. Appleton & Co. The publications of the house extend over the entire field of literature. The firm's New American Cyclopedia was for 50 years the largest and most widely circulated work of its kind ever produced in the United States. His company was continued by his descendants.

Appleton retired in 1848.

== Personal life ==
On December 18, 1813, Daniel married Hannah Adams (1791–1859), the daughter of John Adams and Dorcas Falkner, who bore him eight children:

- William Henry Appleton (1814–1899), who married Mary Moody Worthen, daughter of Ezra Worthen and sister of William Ezra Worthen, in 1844.
- Maria Louisa Appleton (b. 1815), who married James E. Cooley (1802–1882)
- John Adams Appleton (1817–1881)
- Charles Horatio Appleton (1819–1820)
- George Swett Appleton (1821–1878), who married Caroline Osgood, daughter of Robert H. Osgood, in 1847.
- Daniel Sidney Appleton (1824–1890), who married Melvina W. Marshall (d. 1878), daughter of Charles H. Marshall, in 1858.
- Samuel Frances Appleton (1826–1883)
- Sarah Emeline Appleton (1829–1861), who married Leopold Bossange, of Paris.

Appleton died in New York City on March 27, 1849.

== Sources ==
- Gilman, D. C.; Peck, H. T.; Colby, F. M., eds. (1905). "Appleton, Daniel" . New International Encyclopedia (1st ed.). New York: Dodd, Mead.
- Wilson, J. G.; Fiske, J., eds. (1900). "Appleton, Daniel" . Appletons' Cyclopædia of American Biography. New York: D. Appleton.
