= D. Appleton & Company =

American publishing company

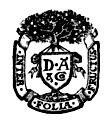
- Founded: 1825
- Founder: Daniel Appleton
- Defunct: 1933
- Successor: D. Appleton-Century Co. (1933–1948); Appleton-Century-Crofts (1948)
- Country of origin: United States
- Headquarters location: New York City, New York, U.S.
- Key people: William Henry Appleton; George Swett Appleton

D. Appleton & Company was an American publishing company founded by Daniel Appleton, who opened a general store in New York city. He sold books, and published his first book in 1831. The company's publications gradually extended over the entire field of literature. It issued the works of contemporary scientists, including those of Herbert Spencer, John Tyndall, Thomas Huxley, Charles Darwin, and others, at reasonable prices. Medical books formed a special department, and books in the Spanish language for the South America market, including the works of Rafael Pombo, were a specialty which the firm made its own. In belles lettres and American history, it had a strong list of names among its authors.

On June 2, 1933, D. Appleton & Company merged with The Century Company.

== Timeline ==
- 1813 Relocated from Haverhill to Boston and imported books from England
- 1825 Relocated New York City and entered the book business with brother-in-law Jonathan Leavitt
- 1831 Published first book: Crumbs from the Master's Table by William Mason (1719–1791)
- 1848 Daniel Appleton retired; son William Henry Appleton (1814–1899) formed a partnership with his brothers, John Adams Appleton (1817–1881), George Swett Appleton (1821–1878), Daniel Sidney Appleton (1824–1890) and Samuel Francis Appleton (1826–1883)
- 1849 Death of Daniel Appleton
- 1857 First New York trade publisher to engage in subscription publishing
- 1869 Appleton's Journal started
- 1872 Popular Science Monthly magazine and International Scientific Series started by editor Edward L. Youmans
- 1875 Original publication of the memoirs of General William Tecumseh Sherman, one of the first such publications by a Civil War general
- 1881 Relocated from Leonard Street and Broadway, to Bond Street, New York City; Journal becomes Appleton's Magazine
- 1890 Co-founded American Book Company, a conglomerate including D. Appleton & Company
- 1894 Published Songs of the Soil by Frank Lebby Stanton
- 1900 Filed for bankruptcy and sold Popular Science; re-organized by Joseph H. Sears of Harper's
- 1905 Appleton's Magazine renamed Appleton's Booklovers Magazine
- 1919 J. W. Hiltman named president
- 1924 Purchased Stewart and Kidd, founded in 1914
- 1931 Published I Sailed with Chinese Pirates by Aleko E. Lilius
- 1933 Merged with The Century Company, founded in 1881, to form the Appleton-Century Company
- 1945 Sold hymn books department to Revell Publishing
- 1948 Merged with F. S. Crofts Co., founded in 1924, to form Appleton-Century-Crofts.

== Publishing highlights ==
- Taylor, Fitch Waterman (1840). The Flag-ship: Or, A Voyage Around the World in the United States Frigate Columbia... Vol. 2 of The Flag Ship, Or: A Voyage Around the World, in the United States Frigate Columbia, Attended by Her Consort the Sloop of War John Adams, and Bearing the Broad Pennant of Commodore George C. Read, Fitch Waterman Taylor. D. Appleton and Company.
- The Red Badge of Courage by Stephen Crane, 1895
- Uncle Remus: His Songs and His Sayings by Joel Chandler Harris, 1880
- Alice's Adventures in Wonderland by Lewis Carroll, 1865, first U.S. edition
- Appletons' Cyclopædia of Biography in 1 volume, 1856, edited by Francis L. Hawks, added American biographies to the volume edited by Elihu Rich and published in 1854 by Richard Griffin & Company (London).
- Appletons' Cyclopædia of American Biography in 6 volumes, 1887, edited by James Grant Wilson and John Fiske
- Appleton's Railroad and Steamboat Guide, 1847
- New American Cyclopedia in 16 volumes, edited by George Ripley and Charles Anderson Dana, 1857–1863; revised and enlarged as American Cyclopedia (1873–1876)
- Progress and Poverty 1880
- Annual Cyclopedia for the years 1861–1901, annual
- Johnson's Universal Cyclopaedia 1893, in 8 volumes edited by Charles Kendall Adams. The rights were acquired from Alvin J. Johnson & Co.
- Universal Cyclopaedia 1900, in 12 volumes derived from Johnson's Universal Cyclopaedia. Edited by Charles Kendall Adams, and from 1902 by Rossiter Johnson, with title Universal Cyclopaedia and Atlas
- The Century Dictionary and Cyclopedia, 1889–1891, New Century Dictionary 1927–c. 1963
- Picturesque America by William Cullen Bryant, 1872
- Unabridged English Dictionary 1859
- works of Jonathan Edwards, 1834 (1703–1758)
- science works of Charles Darwin (1809–1882)
- Diseases of the Heart and Arterial System, by Dr. Robert Hall Babcock (1903)
- Diseases of the Lungs by Dr. Robert Hall Babcock (1907)
- Memoirs of William Tecumseh Sherman (1820–1891)
- The Works of Rudyard Kipling [Authorized Editions] 15 Volumes (1899)
- literary works of Henry James (1843–1916)
- art works of Edith Wharton (1862–1937)
- architectural works of Stanford White (d. 1906)
- Gems of British Art, 1857
- work of Thomas Henry Huxley, 1880
- From the Manger to the Throne 1880—1889 by REV. T. DeWitt Talmage, D.D.
- American Negro Slavery by Ulrich Bonnell Phillips, 1918
- The Rise and Fall of the Confederate Government by Jefferson Davis
- A Journey in Other Worlds by John Jacob Astor

== Book series ==
- Civil War Series
- Croft Classics
- New Century Classics

== Gallery ==
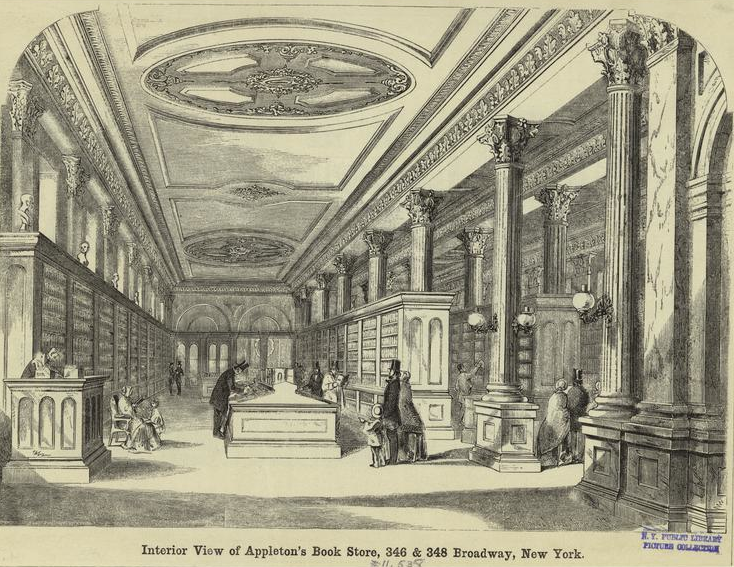
Appletons' bookshop, 346 & 348 Broadway, New York, 1856

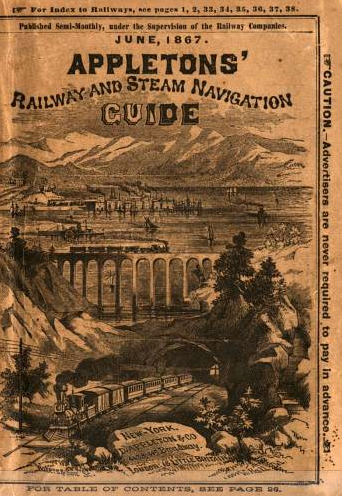
Appletons' Railway and Steam Navigation Guide, 1867

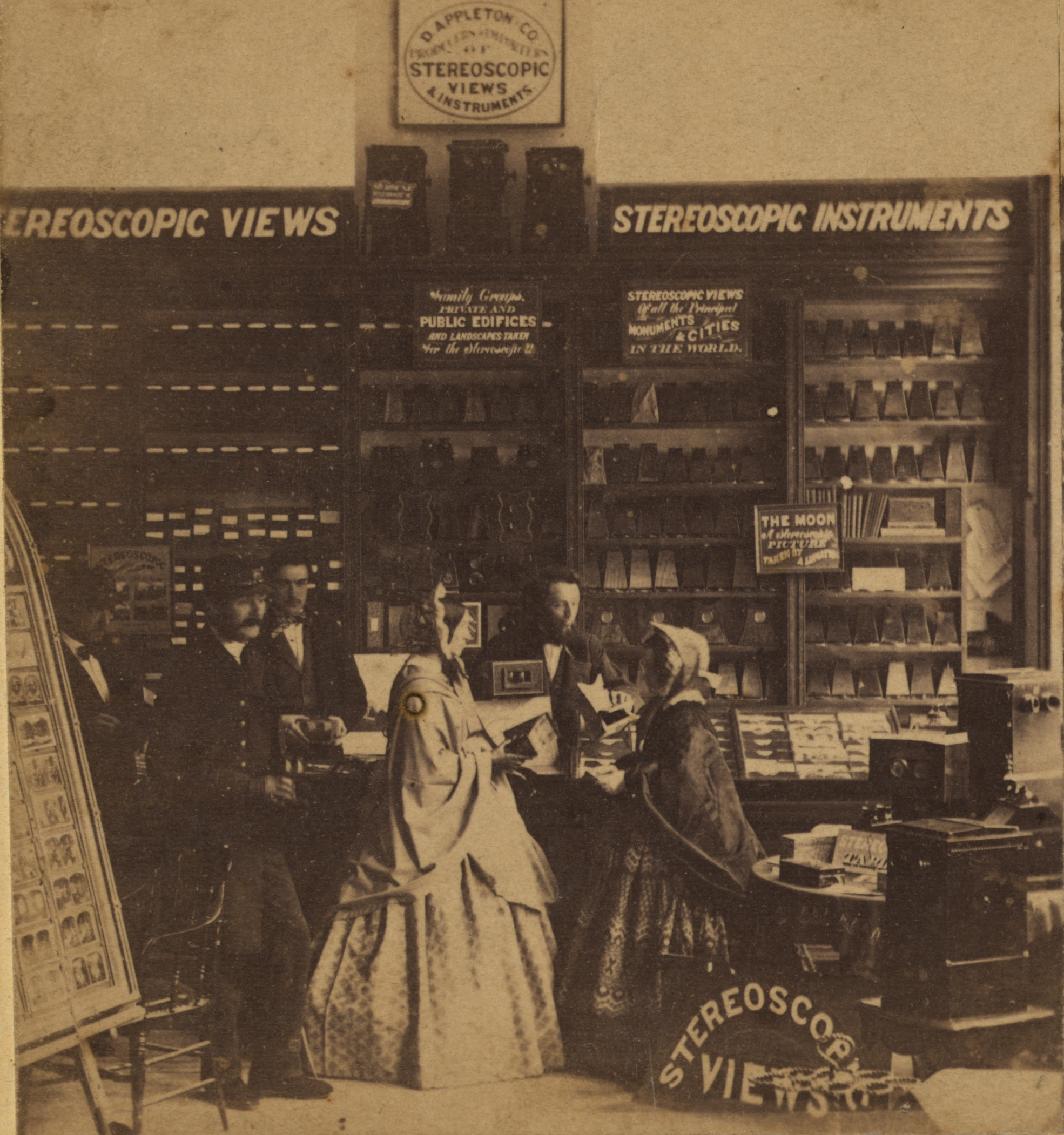
Display of D. Appleton & Co. stereoscopic views and implements, 1870s

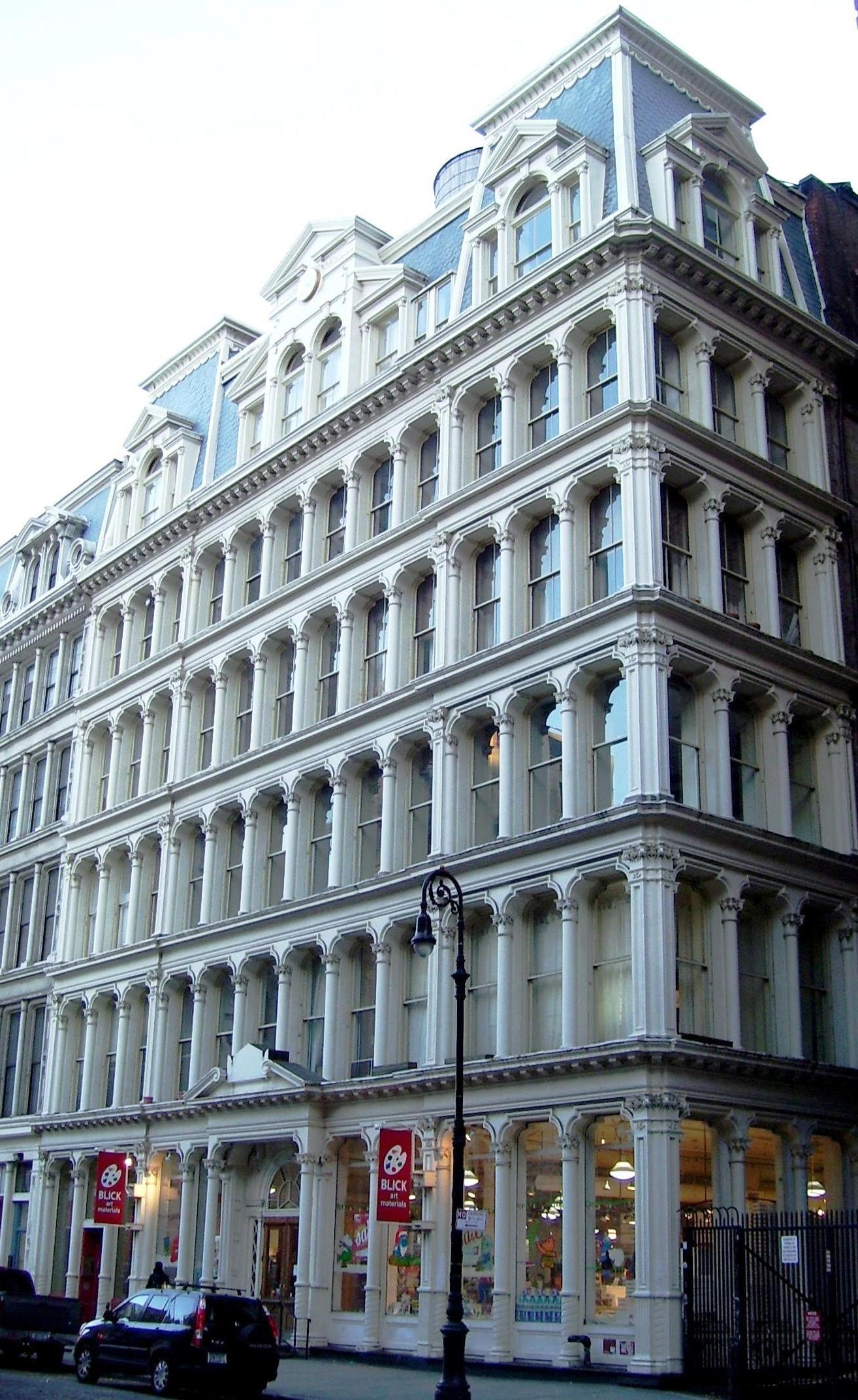
Robbins & Appleton Building, New York, built 1880 (photo 2010)

== See also ==
- Appletons' Cyclopædia of American Biography
- American Cyclopædia
- Appleton's Magazine
- Appletons' travel guides
