= Morning on the Wissahiccon =

Short story by Edgar Allan Poe

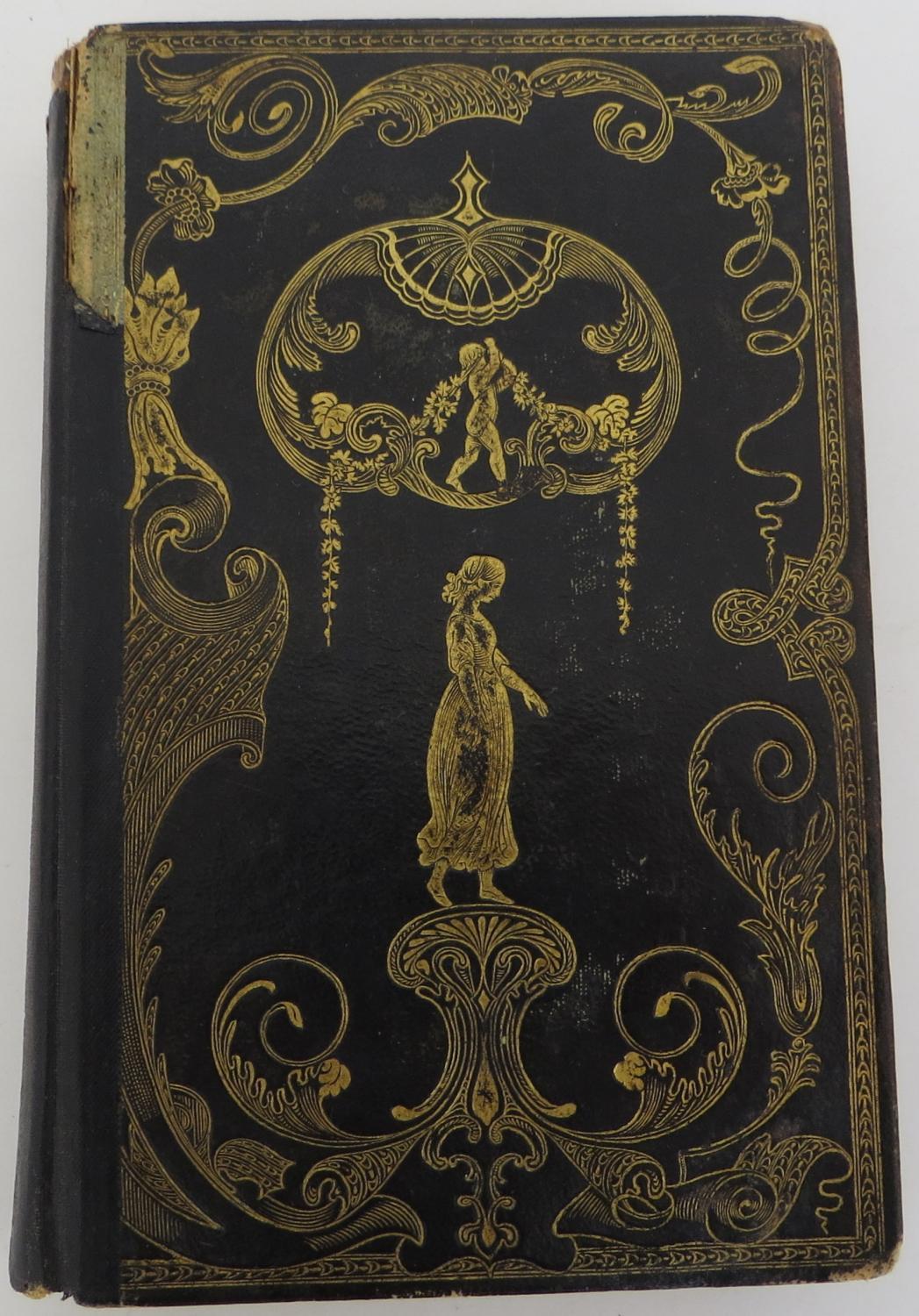
The Opal, 1844, edited by N.P. Willis. John C. Riker, New York.

"Morning on the Wissahiccon" (also called "The Elk") is an 1844 work by Edgar Allan Poe describing the natural beauty of Wissahickon Creek, which flows into the Schuylkill River in Philadelphia. It borders between being a short story and a travel essay.

The work was published in The Opal annual in 1844.

== Overview ==
Poe criticizes tourists who focus on "the most beaten thoroughfares of the country" and do not look at the beauty of sites "far away from the track." He describes the area in detail and its wild beauty, in particular the creek itself. On one visit, he sees an elk on a cliff. The majesty of this "oldest and boldest" of elks is ruined when he realizes it was a domesticated pet, not a wild creature, belonging to "an English family occupying a villa in the vicinity."

Poe refers to the writing of actress Fanny Kemble in this essay, saying it was she who first brought the beautiful area to people's attention in her "droll book", Journal, in 1835.

== Publication history ==
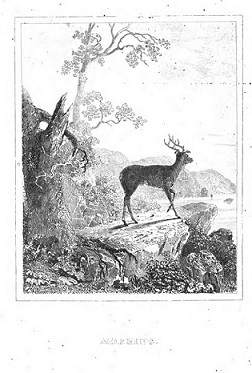
Illustration by John Gadsby Chapman in The Opal: A Pure Gift for the Holy Days, 1844.

The work was first published as "Morning on the Wissahiccon" in the annual The Opal: A Pure Gift for the Holy Days in 1844. Like Poe's previous "The Island of the Fay," it was originally a "plate article," a work written specifically to accompany an engraving. The original engraving by John Gadsby Chapman depicted an elk in an idyllic nature setting.

The Opal was an annual gift book edited by Nathaniel Parker Willis. Established by Rufus Wilmot Griswold, it was published in New York by John C. Riker.

== Analysis ==
"Morning on the Wissahiccon" represents Poe's quest for beauty. He begins with a discussion of the "natural scenery" of North America as compared to the Old World, particularly Europe. He describes the beauty of the Wissahiccon brook outside of Philadelphia. He had come upon the scene during his excursions. He castigates both American and foreign travelers who focus on the popular natural sights but ignore the "Edens of the land"

Travelers miss many North American landscapes because they are difficult to access. This is different in England. In particular, he cites "the valley of Louisiana" which is "of all extensive areas of natural loveliness, this is perhaps the most lovely". To appreciate the natural scenery of North America, a traveler must go by foot.

He then notices an elk near a precipice. He assumes it is a wild animal. He later observes, however, that a man moves towards it with carrying salt and a halter. He is disappointed to discover the elk is a domesticated pet.

He concludes: "Thus ended my romance of the elk."
