= Mary Mathews Adams =

American poet (1840–1902)

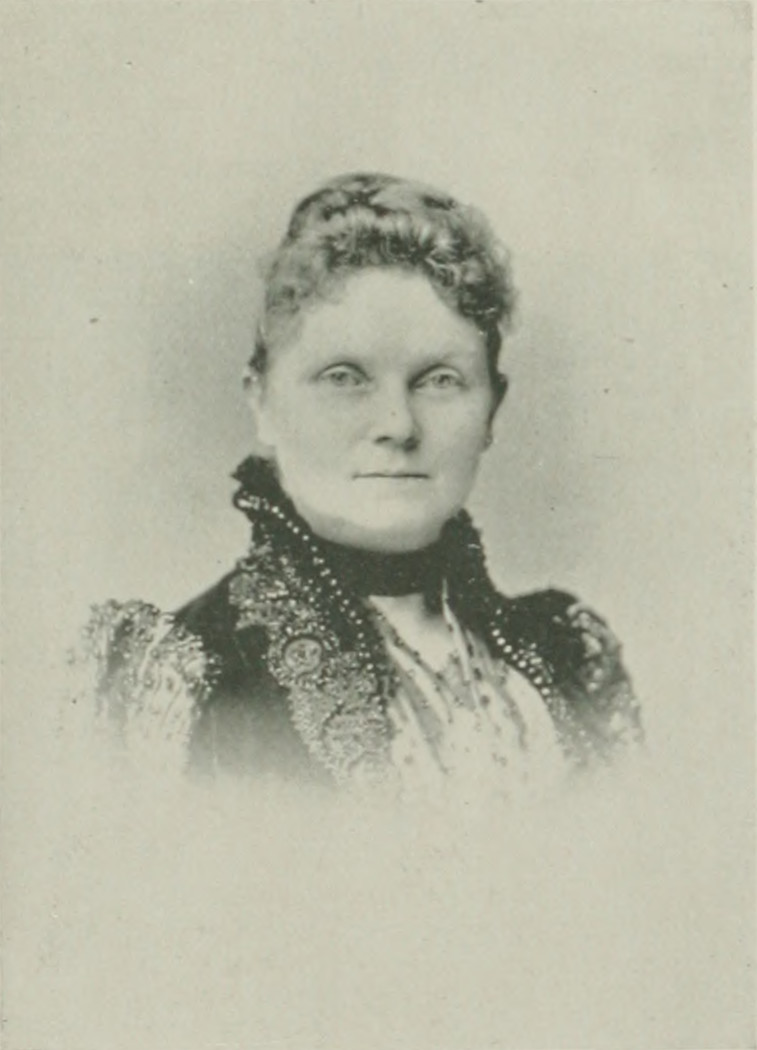
- "A Woman of the Century"
- Born: Mary Jane Mathews; October 23, 1840; Granard, County Longford, Ireland
- Died: December 11, 1902 (aged 62); Redlands, California, U.S.
- Education: Packer Collegiate Institute
- Occupations: writer, philanthropist
- Spouse(s): Cassius M. Smith (m. 1869; died 1876) Alfred Smith Barnes (m. 1883; died 1888) Charles Kendall Adams (m. 1890; died 1902)
- Children: 1
- Writing career
- Language: English
- Genre: Poetry
- Notable work: "Epithalamium"

Mary Mathews Adams (previously, Mary Mathews Smith and Mary Mathews Barnes; October 23, 1840 – December 11, 1902) was an Irish-born American writer and philanthropist. The author of thirty or more hymns, it was her Shakespearian study in which she won repute. She became wealthy after marrying Alfred Smith Barnes and distributed numerous benefactions.

== Early life and education ==
Mary Jane Mathews was born in Granard, County Longford, Ireland, October 23, 1840. She was the oldest child of John Mathews (d. Staten Island, April 1, 1869), a Protestant. Her mother, a Catholic, was Anna (Reilly) Mathews (d. Brooklyn, ca. 1850). All of the children —Mary Jane, Robert, Anna, John, and Virginia Scott (born in New York City)— were reared in the Catholic Church but all save the youngest left the church early in life. Emigrating to the United States about 1846, when Adams was six years old, the family grew up in Brooklyn.

When she was 12 or 13 years of age, Adams became a student at Packer Collegiate Institute, which she left in 1855 at the age of 15, without graduating. From this, she passed into a graded school.

== Career ==
According to family tradition, Adams was a school teacher at the age of seventeen years. Records show that from 1862 to 1868, she taught in Public School No. 15, Degraw Street, Brooklyn.

In the autumn of 1869, she married Cassius M. Smith, of Canandaigua, New York, and two years later, went with him to Atchison, Kansas, where her only child was born, and lived less than a year. Cassius Smith appears to have died in 1876, whereupon Adams returned to Brooklyn and became a teacher in the Juvenile High School. Her enthusiasm as a student, which she always had, found its best result in her interpretations of Shakespeare, and of reading under her able guidance his delineations of character. It was her Shakespearian study in which she won repute.

On November 7, 1883, she married Alfred Smith Barnes, a wealthy man, who was a prominent publisher and philanthropist. His first wife (née Harriet Burr) had died in 1881, leaving him five sons and three daughters. Mr. Barnes died at his Brooklyn home on February 17, 1888. Subsequent to her marriage to Mr. Barnes, when she was 44 years of age, she became wealthy and distributed numerous benefactions. During this marriage, she was personally concerned in aiding several worthy institutions which had won her favor — prominent among them being the Home for Incurables and St. John's Protestant Episcopal Hospital, in Brooklyn.

On July 9, 1890, in London, she married Charles Kendall Adams, then president of Cornell University, which institution had received liberal gifts from Mr. Barnes, during the bestowal of which she had first become acquainted with Mr. Adams. As Mrs. Adams, her helpfulness was chiefly manifested in behalf of worthy students, both at Ithaca and Madison, who were struggling against financial odds.

She was the author of thirty or more hymns, many of them incorporated in song books; of a score or more of songs and ballads, several of which were set to music, and of many lyrics and sonnets. Of her songs, the most popular were "The Birds in the Belfry," "Songs that Words can Never Know," and "The Spring Will Soon be Here Again." Adams was a poet whose numerous odes and sonnets won the commendation of several distinguished English and American critics. Her published works were: Epithalamium (N. Y. and London, 1889); The Choir Visible (Chicago, 1897); and Sonnets and Songs (N. Y. and London, 1901). In 1893, at the World's Congress of Representative Women, she spoke on the topic "The Highest Education".

== Death and legacy ==
Poor health of Mr. and Mrs. Adams led them to remove to California during the winter of 1901. The husband died on July 26, 1902, within three weeks of moving into their property in Redlands, California. She died a few months later, on December 11, 1902.

Adams not only gave to the California Historical Society on the occasion of her removal to California, her own extensive private library, but with her personal jewels, endowed the Mary M. Adams Art Fund (US$4,000), to be used in the purchase of either art books for the society's library or objects of art for its museum. What property she had remaining at her death — not large, for her interest in the Barnes estate was in the form of an annuity — was, like her husband's, willed to the University of Wisconsin, for whose welfare she strove throughout the last decade of her life.

== Style and themes ==
The "Epithalamium" is perhaps the best known of her poems. Her verse was largely lyrical, and her themes included romance, heroism, and religion.
