= Universal Cyclopaedia =

Encyclopedia by Charles Kendall Adams

The 12-volume Universal Cyclopaedia was edited by Charles Kendall Adams, and was published by D. Appleton & Company in 1900. The name was changed to Universal Cyclopaedia and Atlas in 1902, with Rossiter Johnson as the editor.

== History ==
This was the culmination of a series of encyclopedic projects that began in 1875-78 with the publication of Johnsons New Universal Cyclopedia in four volumes by A. J. Johnson and Sons. A revised version was printed in 8 volumes in 1884, though "no revisions of note had been implemented. The original Editors in Chief were Frederick Augustus Porter Barnard and Arnold Henry Guyot From 1893–1897, it was republished as Johnson's Universal Encyclopedia. The encyclopedia was sold to D. Appleton & Company midway through the project, so vols. 2, 3, 4, 6 and 7 – the first to be published – retain the Johnson imprint, while vols. 1, 5 and 8 were published under the Appleton imprint. The editor of this edition was Charles Kendall Adams, president of Cornell University.

In 1900 the encyclopedia was revised again by Adams and expanded to 12 volumes. As Johnson was no longer involved, this edition was published as Universal Cyclopaedia, which is described as one of the best encyclopedias of the time. Further editions were published in 1901, 1903 and 1905. Upon Adams' death in 1902, editorial duties were taken over by Rossiter Johnson.

In the "Publisher's Announcement" in Volume I of the original edition, A. J. Johnson stated that Horace Greeley suggested the plan for the work and urged its publication, and was a primary advisor. Greeley is listed as an associate editor. One of Greeley's requirements was that the cyclopaedia "be pre-eminently a book of facts, and to a very limited extent, if at all, a volume of discussions or of critical opinions."

There was some protest against the depiction of Catholic doctrine and practices in the Universal Cyclopaedia and Atlas.
