= William Henry Appleton =

American publisher

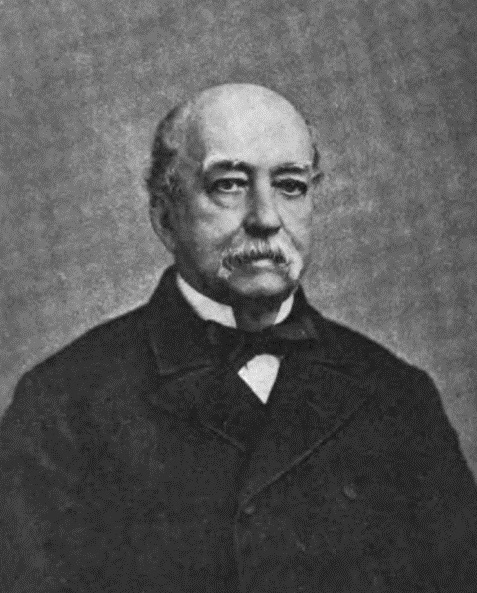
- Born: January 27, 1814; Haverhill, Massachusetts, U.S.
- Died: October 19, 1899 (aged 85); Riverdale, Bronx, New York, U.S.
- Occupation: Publisher
- Spouse: Mary Moody Worthen (m. 1844; died 1884)
- Children: 4
- Parent(s): Daniel Appleton; Hannah Adams
- Relatives: George Swett Appleton (brother); William Ezra Worthen (brother-in-law)

William Henry Appleton (January 27, 1814 – October 19, 1899) was an American publisher, eldest son and successor of Daniel Appleton.

== Early life ==
William Henry Appleton was born on January 27, 1814, at Haverhill, Massachusetts. He was the eldest of eight children born to Daniel Appleton (1785–1849) and Hannah Adams (1791–1859), the daughter of John Adams and Dorcas Falkner.

== Career ==
In 1838, Appleton he joined his father as a partner in the family publishing business, D. Appleton & Company, which he had begun clerking for in 1831 at the age of 16.

In 1848, he became the senior member of D. Appleton & Company upon the retirement of his father. In partnership with his brother John Adams Appleton; they were joined in partnership by three younger brothers.

In 1853, William became the firm's London representative. He was active in the struggle for an international copyright, and served a term as president of the American Publishers Copyright League. His firm published works by a range of noteworthy authors, including Hall Caine, Lewis Carroll, Arthur Conan Doyle, Charles Darwin, Thomas Henry Huxley, Herbert Spencer, and John Stuart Mill, as well as leading American scientists and philosophers of his era.

Among the reference books brought out by him were The New American Cyclopædia (1858–63); Webster's Spelling Book; Appletons' Cyclopædia of American Biography (1887–1900), Applied Mechanics (1897), and an Annual Cyclopœdia (1885–1903). He wrote Letters on International Copyright (1872).

== Personal life ==
On April 16, 1844, he married Mary Moody Worthen (1824–1884), a daughter of Ezra Worthen and sister of William Ezra Worthen.

- William Worthen Appleton (1845–1924), who married Anna Debois Sargent (1845–1908).
- Kate Appleton (1848–1873), who married Hobart Seymour Geary (1838–1918), a merchant, in 1872.
- Mary Appleton (d. 1934), who died unmarried.
- Henry Cozzens Appleton (1863–1925), who married Dora Threlkeld (1847–1927).

Appleton was a prominent figure in publishing for a period of sixty years. He lived at Wave Hill (New York); the house was later turned into a botanical garden in the Riverdale section of The Bronx, New York. He was one of the earliest members of the Century Association, joining in 1847, a member of the Union Club of New York, the Riding Club, and the Aldine and Players' Clubs.

He died at his home in Riverdale on October 19, 1899. He is buried in Woodlawn Cemetery in The Bronx.

=== Descendants ===
His grandson, through his son William, was William Henry Appleton (1866–1951), a prominent yachtsman who married Noel Johnston, granddaughter of John Taylor Johnston, former president of the Central Railroad of New Jersey and the founding president of The Metropolitan Museum of Art.

=== Legacy ===
Appleton City, Missouri, was named after the publisher, in appreciation of his 1870 donation to the town's library.

== In popular culture ==
Appleton is a character in the time travel novel The Plot to Save Socrates by Paul Levinson. As depicted in the book, Appleton had an extensive secret life as a time-traveler, had visited Classical Greece and met in person some of the famous ancient Greek writers and philosophers whose works he published, and also several times visited the 21st century – but always found his own 19th century milieu to be the most congenial.
