= The Opal (annual) =

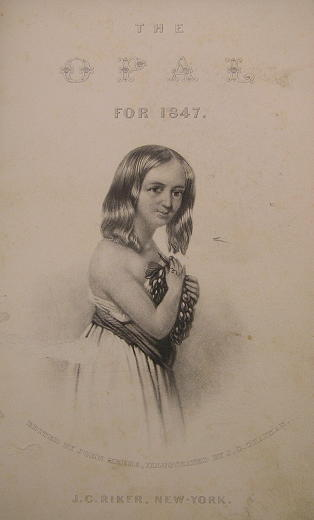
The Opal frontispiece from 1847

The Opal: A Pure Gift for the Holy Days, was an annual gift book, founded by Rufus Wilmot Griswold and published in New York by John C. Riker, from 1844 to 1849. Content included short stories, illustrations and poems.

Griswold began soliciting contributions for the annual in 1843, initially intending to call it The Christian Offering. It was first edited by Nathaniel Parker Willis, John Keese and finally by Sarah Josepha Hale. It was in the 1844 issue that Edgar Allan Poe first published "Morning on the Wissahiccon". Other contributors included Henry Wadsworth Longfellow, Elizabeth F. Ellet and John Greenleaf Whittier.
