= American Farmer =

American public affairs radio program

American Farmer was an American public affairs radio program featuring farm news and information of value to listeners in rural America.

It was heard on the ABC radio network from 1945 to 1963, airing on Saturdays and heard in a variety of timeslots on different ABC affiliates throughout the day. One of the contributors was Layne R. Beaty, as noted in his obituary by Yvonne Shinhoster Lamb.

A typical American Farmer program was described in the Portsmouth Times of Portsmouth, Ohio when it covered Saturday programming in its Friday "Tuning in the Airwaves" highlights for July 13, 1947. The column noted that "government experts will report on the status of the nation's corn crop" during the next day's broadcast of American Farmer.
