= John Howard Appleton =

American chemist

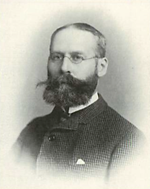
- Born: February 3, 1844; Portland, Maine
- Died: February 18, 1930 (aged 86); Providence, Rhode Island
- Occupation: Chemist

John Howard Appleton (February 3, 1844 – February 18, 1930) was an American chemist.

Appleton was born in Portland, Maine, February 3, 1844. He graduated from Brown University with bachelor of philosophy degree in 1863. The following year, he became instructor in chemistry there, and in 1868 was elected professor of chemistry and applied arts, a position which he held till his mandatory retirement at the age of 70 in 1914. He was State Sealer of Weights and Measures and also chemist for the State Board of Agriculture. He was a fellow of the American Association for the Advancement of Science and was named an honorary member of the American Institute of Chemistry in 1928. He died in Providence, Rhode Island on February 18, 1930.

== Selected works ==
Appleton wrote 12 books on chemistry. They include:

- The Young Chemist (Philadelphia, 1878)
- Qualitative Analysis (1878)
- Quantitative Analysis (1881);
- Chemistry, developed by facts and principles drawn chiefly from the non-metals (Providence, 1884)
