= Charles Kendall Adams =

American educator and historian

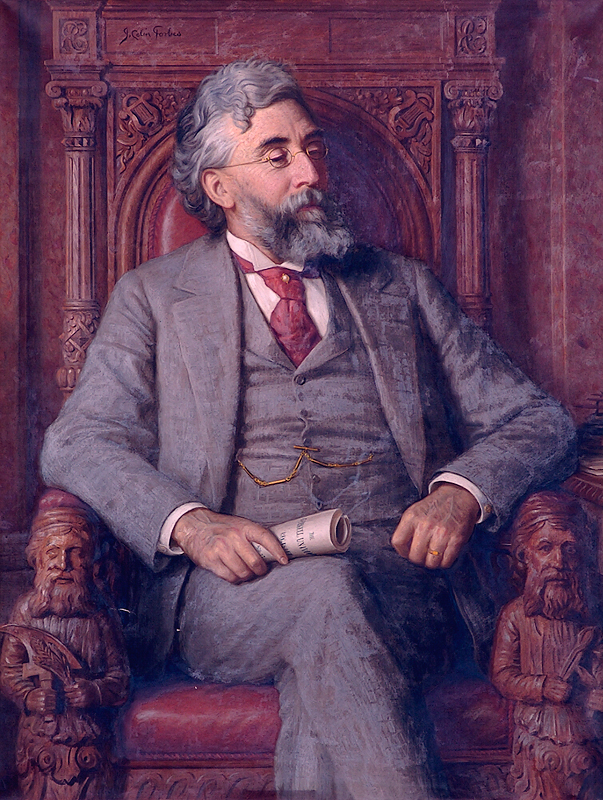
- portrait by John Colin Forbes

8th President of University of Wisconsin–Madison
- In office January 17, 1893 – October 11, 1901
- Preceded by: Thomas Chrowder Chamberlin
- Succeeded by: Edward Birge

2nd President of Cornell University
- In office November 19, 1885 – November 11, 1892
- Preceded by: Andrew Dickson White
- Succeeded by: Jacob Gould Schurman

Personal details
- Born: January 24, 1835 Derby, Vermont, U.S.
- Died: July 26, 1902 (aged 67) Redlands, California, U.S.
- Spouse: Mary Mathews (m. 1890)
- Education: University of Michigan (BA, MA)

Charles Kendall Adams (January 24, 1835 – July 26, 1902) was an American educator and historian. He served as the second president of Cornell University from 1885 until 1892, and as president of the University of Wisconsin from 1892 until 1901. At Cornell he established a new law school, built a library, and appointed eminent research professors for the Ivy League school. At Wisconsin, he negotiated ever-increasing appropriations from the state legislature, especially for new buildings such as the library. He was the editor-in-chief of Johnson's Universal Cyclopaedia (1892–1895), and of the successor Universal Cyclopaedia (1900), sometimes referred to as Appleton's Universal Cyclopaedia.

== Biography ==
He was born on January 24, 1835, in Derby, Vermont, and he attended the common schools in that place till 1855, when, with his parents, he immigrated to Denmark, Iowa, where he entered an academy and commenced the study of Latin and Greek with the purpose of entering college. In the summer of 1857 he began the classical course at the University of Michigan, where he studied history with Andrew Dickson White, Cornell's first president, and from where he graduated in 1861.

Taking a post-graduate course of study, he was employed to teach one of the classes in history, and at the end of the year was appointed instructor of history and Latin. In 1863 Adams became assistant professor of Latin and history at Michigan, a position which he held till 1867, when he became full professor of history until 1885. In 1867 and 1868, was spent in Germany having studied at the University of Bonn, Heidelberg University, Leipzig University, the Friedrich Wilhelm University of Berlin, and the Ludwig-Maximilians-Universität München, where his object was to observe the methods of advanced instruction; about four months were passed in Italy and France, chiefly in Rome and Paris. In 1869 and 1870 established an historical seminary which proved of great value in promoting the study of history and political science. In 1881, he was made non-resident professor of history at Cornell, and in 1885 succeeded White as president of Cornell. He was forced to resign at Cornell due to conflicts with the faculty over honorary degrees and control of faculty appointments. Also in 1881, he was simultaneously invited to the presidency of the University of Kansas and the University of Nebraska, both of which positions were declined.

He received the honorary degree of LL.D. from the University of Chicago in 1874, and from Harvard in 1886. In 1887 Adams was elected a member of the American Antiquarian Society. In 1890 he was president of the American Historical Association. He resigned his professorship in May 1892, and in July of the same year he was elected president of the University of Wisconsin, where he remained until October 11, 1901. He died on July 26, 1902, in Redlands, California, where he had moved in hopes of improving his health.

== Works ==
- Democracy and Monarchy in France (1871)
- Manual of Historical Literature (1882)
- Representative British Orations (1884)
- Christopher Columbus, His Life and Work (1892)
- Universal Cyclopaedia and Atlas (1905)
