= William Ezra Worthen =

American civil engineer

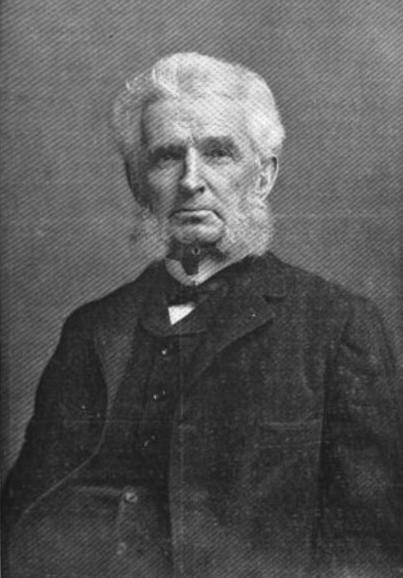
- Born: March 14, 1819; Amesbury, Massachusetts
- Died: April 2, 1897 (aged 78); New York City
- Education: Harvard College
- Spouse: Margaret B. Hobbs (m. 1846)

William Ezra Worthen (March 14, 1819 – April 2, 1897) was a Harvard-educated American civil engineer. He was President of the American Society of Civil Engineers in 1887, and elected an Honorary Member in 1898.

== Biography ==
William E. Worthen was born in Amesbury, Massachusetts on March 14, 1819. His father, Ezra Worthen, was one of the creators of Lowell, Massachusetts as a center of manufacturing, and the first Superintendent of the Merrimac Mills. William E. Worthen graduated from Harvard College in 1838 and commenced the profession of civil engineering under the tutorship of Samuel Morse Felton, an assistant in the office of the then prominent engineer Colonel Loammi Baldwin Jr. The day after graduation from Harvard Worthen started working under the direction of George Rumford Baldwin measuring the flow of the water used at the Merrimac Mills. Worthen went with Baldwin to Boston and was employed in the surveys and brook measurements for an increased supply for the Jamaica Pond Water Works, a private enterprise for supplying Boston with water by gravity. He then returned to Lowell and under James B. Francis was engaged for some time in general hydraulic and mill work.

In 1840 Worthen was with George Washington Whistler on the Albany and West Stockbridge Railroad, commencing with the preliminary surveys of the road and remaining until its completion, 7 miles of the construction work having been under his immediate charge. Returning to Lowell he was again engaged with Francis in hydraulic work and the construction of the lower end of the Northern Canal. He then designed and built a dam and the mills on the Suncook River at Suncook, New Hampshire. He also designed and constructed a dam and mills for the Boston Manufacturing Company on the Charles River at Waltham, Massachusetts and the Suffolk, Tremont, Lawrence, Appleton, and Hamilton Mills at Lowell. He reported on the water supply of Lowell and for a time was in charge of the cotton mills and machine shops of the Boston Manufacturing Company as Acting Superintendent.

After a visit to Europe in 1849, Worthen came to New York City and to some extent devoted himself to architectural work, building the structures at No 200 Broadway. At the same time he took part in editing several mechanical publications. In 1851 he was in charge of the cotton mills and machine shops of the Matteawan Company at Fishkill, New York, but returning to New York in the following year, he was again engaged as an architect, designing and constructing among other buildings, the bindery of the Appleton Publishing Company on Franklin Street and Appleton's facility in Williamsburg. Later he was Engineer of the New York and New Haven Railroad and Vice President of that road until 1854 under Robert L. Schuyler. He designed and built the dam across the Bronx River at West Farms, and then, opening an office in New York City, supplemented his architectural and engineering practice by constructive iron work and steam heating for buildings. He was engaged for a long time in general engineering work building the dam across the Mohawk River at Cohoes, New York, testing steam pumping machinery at many points, and designing pumping engines for James P. Kirkwood for his reports on the water supply of Cincinnati, Ohio and of St. Louis, Missouri. He devised floating grain docks for Kirkwood at the Jersey City depot of the Erie Railroad.

From 1866 to 1869 Worthen was Sanitary Engineer of the Metropolitan Board of Health of New York City.

In 1874 Worthen served on a committee of the American Society of Civil Engineers (ASCE) appointed to investigate the failure of the Williamsburg Reservoir Dam at Mill River in Williamsburg, Massachusetts. The committee was composed of Worthen, James B. Francis, and Theodore G. Ellis. William Worthen also served on the ASCE committee that investigated the failure of the South Fork Dam, which caused the Johnstown Flood of 1889. That ASCE investigation report was not published until two years after the disaster. A detailed discussion of the South Fork dam investigation, the participating engineers, and the science behind the 1889 Johnstown flood was published in 2018.

Worthen was a frequent contributor to the professional discussions of the Society and presented the following papers:

- Improvement of Sedimentary Rivers Transactions Vol XX page 280
- Concrete Sewers at Mount Vernon NY Vol XXIV page 898
- Steam Heating Vol XXIV page 206

This very incomplete sketch will give some idea of the varied practice which had occupied Mr Worthen during a long and most active professional life there being scarcely a branch of civil or mechanical engineering wherein his professional fitness has not been conspicuous in a marked degree. It has not been his lot to project or carry to completion great works of internal improvement such as challenge the admiration of the unthinking public but in a very unobtrusive way he had been continually rendering that essential service toward the furthering of enterprise without which the best conceived projects would prove abortive. To a remarkable power of rapid generalization seemingly incompatible with painstaking accuracy he united an almost intuitive perception of the requisite expedients of detail and design. His quickness in technical analysis, combined with the before mentioned qualities, has rendered possible the successful completion of many important works with which, owing to a forgetfulness of self his name is scarcely associated A retentive memory to sift and treasure the facts in science and art which extended study, had opened up to him the tact of judicious selection and application originality and boldness at times bordering on audacity and a positiveness that silenced all opposition have been the characteristic features of his long practice. Whatever Mr Worthen may have owed to study or experience in the arts of construction his acknowledged genius, using the word in its strictest sense, stamped him as an engineer nascitur non fit.

Mr Worthen possessed an overflowing vein of wit and humor which served to temper the asperities not unusual in professional debates, this coupled with a kindliness of disposition which could see nothing in others to speak of but what was commendable led to his friends being numbered only by his acquaintance. His social relations were of the happiest kind and his memory will be long prized by all who knew him.

He married Miss Margaret B. Hobbs of Boston on March 19, 1846. They had one son who died in infancy.

Worthen became a Member of the American Society of Civil Engineers December 4, 1867. He was elected President of the Society January 19, 1887 and served one term, he was made an Honorary Member of the Society April 4, 1898. He was an honorary member of the Engineers' Club of Saint Louis.

Worthen was paralyzed by a stroke in December, 1896, and died in New York City on April 2, 1897.
