= John Keese =

John Keese (24 November 1805 in New York City – 30 May 1856 in Brooklyn, New York) was an American auctioneer, publisher and editor of books.

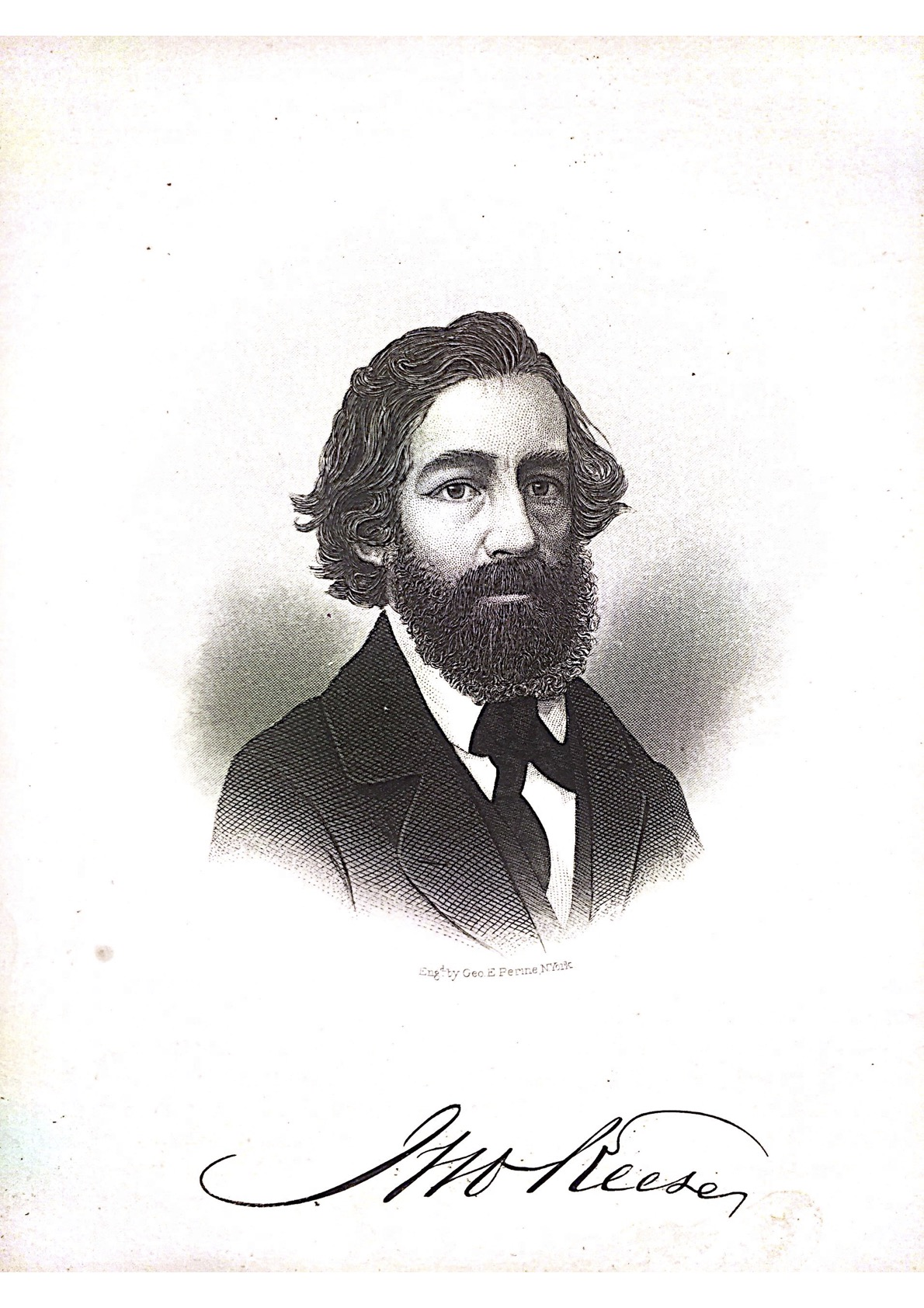
John Keese

== Biography ==
He received an academical education, and at the age of eighteen entered as clerk with a book publishing house in New York City. Several years afterward he became partner in the concern, and from 1842 until 1853 he was engaged in the book-auction business. In 1854 Keese received the appointment of appraiser of books in the New York Custom House, which office he filled until his death. While in office, he devoted many evenings to his former vocation of book auctioneer.

During his career, Keese became widely known among literary men and booksellers as a humorous off-hand speaker, editor, and wit. He was the author of many verses that appeared anonymously in the periodicals of his time. In 1852 he delivered a lecture on “The Influence of Knowledge” at the Broadway Tabernacle in New York City. After the formation of the auction firm of Cooley, Keese and Hill he began his opening address at the book-trade sales, saying: “Gentlemen: You have a right to know something about our methods and plans of business. First, we shall on all occasions take everything Cooley. As for the security of your goods, they will always be under the protection of excellent locks and Keese; and you may rely on our stability, for we rest upon one of the granite Hills of New Hampshire.”

At another time he offered a collection of poems by some unknown author, remarking: “This is a book by a poor and pious girl, who wrote poor and pious poetry.” Again a parcel of books was knocked down to one Owen Phalen, with the remark: “Don't know about selling to a man who is always Owen and Phalen.”

== Family life ==
In the Spring of 1843, John Keese's son, Willetts died in a drowning accident.

== Works ==
Mr. Keese edited:

- The Poets of America (2 vols., New York, 1839-1840)
- The Poetical Remains of Lucy Hooper (1842)
- Poems by Elizabeth Oakes Smith (1843)
- The Mourner's Chaplet (Boston, 1844)
- The Winter-Green, an annual (1844)
- The Opal, an annual (2 vols., 1846-1847)
- The Forest Legendary (1848)
- The Floral Keepsake (1850)

He also furnished a large part of the text for North American Scenery by Whitefield (1845).
