= George Swett Appleton =

American publisher

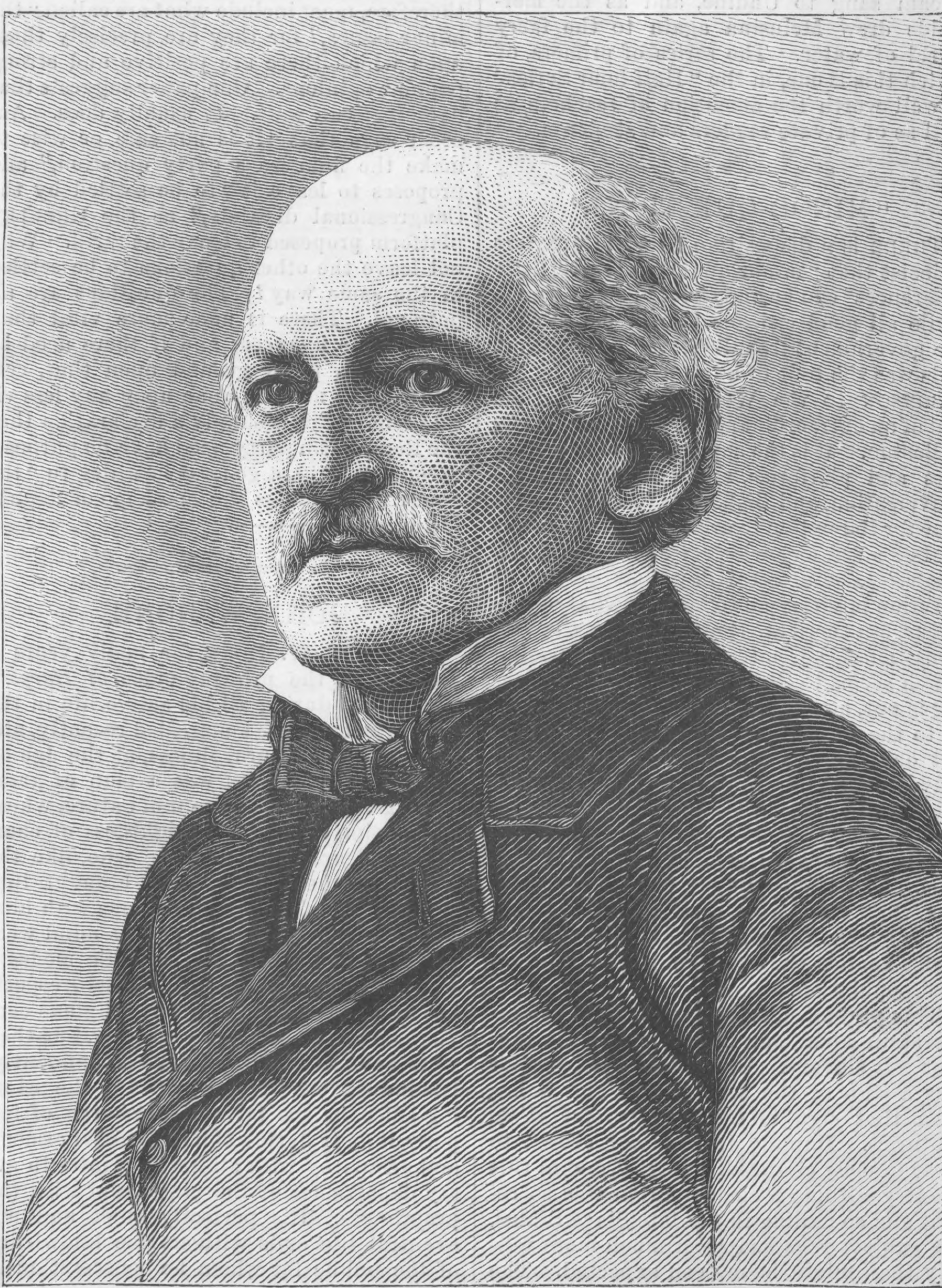
- Born: August 11, 1821; Andover, Massachusetts
- Died: July 8, 1878 (aged 56); Riverdale, Bronx, New York
- Occupation: Publisher
- Spouse: Caroline Osgood (m. 1846; died 1878)
- Children: 5
- Parent(s): Daniel Appleton; Hannah Adams
- Relatives: William Henry Appleton (brother)

George Swett Appleton (August 11, 1821 – July 8, 1878) was an American publisher, the third son of Daniel Appleton.

== Early life ==
George Swett Appleton was born on August 11, 1821, in Andover, Massachusetts. He was the third son of eight children born to Daniel Appleton (1785–1849) and Hannah Adams (1791–1859), the daughter of John Adams and Dorcas Falkner.

Appleton received a liberal education in New York and then traveled abroad to study, particularly in Leipzig, Germany.

== Career ==
After his studies in Germany, he returned to the United States and for a number of years was an independent publisher and a book seller in Philadelphia. Employees included Joseph Sabin, later compiler of Bibliotheca Americana: A Dictionary of Books Relating to America

In 1860, he joined the family publishing business, D. Appleton & Company, with his brothers and acted as the de facto press agent of the firm.

In 1865, George moved his family to New York and became a partner with his three brothers, John, William, and Sidney in his father's publishing business, D. Appleton & Company. He was a scholar and art connoisseur, and acted as the literary adviser to the firm. Appletons' Art Journal and the Popular Science Monthly were planned by him. He was also responsible for the Picturesque America volumes.

== Personal life ==
In Paris in 1846, he married Caroline Archer Osgood (b. 1830), the daughter of Robert H. Osgood of Salem, Massachusetts and sister of Rear Commodore Franklin Osgood (1828-1888) of the New York Yacht Club. Together they had two daughters and three sons:

- Ellina Appleton (b. 1848), who married William A. Fraser in 1867.
- Walter Stone Appleton (b. 1849), who married Annie P. Beach, the daughter of W. A. Beach, of Troy.
- Emma Appleton (b. 1852), who married Madan, a Cuban.
- George Swett Appleton (1854–1886), who worked at D. Appleton & Co.
- Francis Appleton (b. 1856)

He was a member of the Century Association in New York, of which his brothers were founders, and a member of Grace Church. Before his death, he resided at 17 East 32nd Street in Manhattan.

Appleton died of cerebro-spinal meningitis on July 8, 1878, at the home of his brother in Riverdale, Bronx. His funeral was held at Grace Church.
