= William Appleton (Massachusetts politician) =

American businessman and politician (1786–1862)

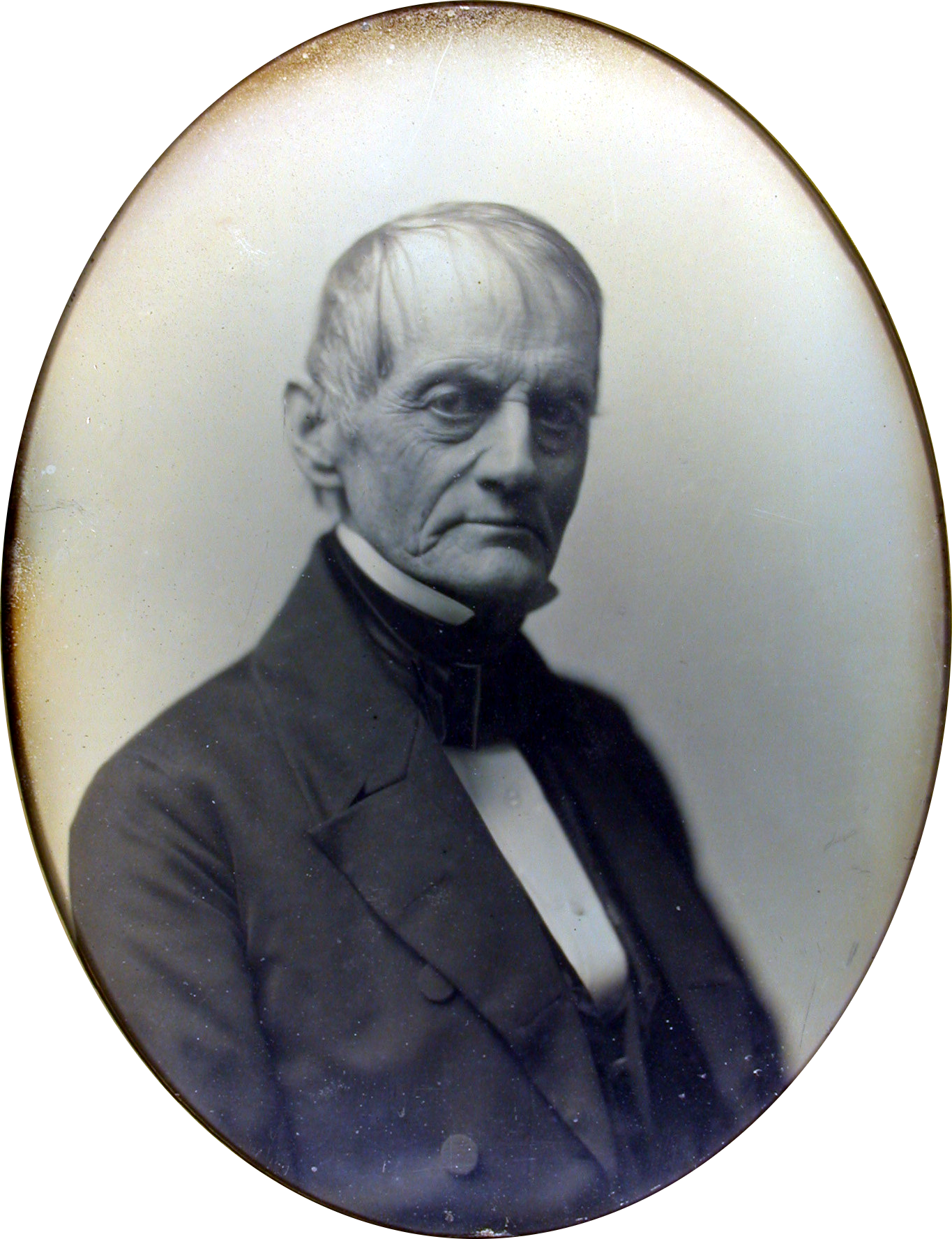

Member of the U.S. House of Representatives from Massachusetts
- In office March 4, 1851 – March 3, 1855
- Preceded by: Samuel Atkins Eliot
- Succeeded by: Anson Burlingame
- Constituency: 1st district (1851–53); 5th district (1853–55)
- In office March 4, 1861 – September 27, 1861
- Preceded by: Anson Burlingame
- Succeeded by: Samuel Hooper
- Constituency: 5th district

Personal details
- Born: November 16, 1786 Brookfield, Massachusetts, U.S.
- Died: February 15, 1862 (aged 75) Longwood, Massachusetts, U.S.
- Party: Whig; Constitutional Union
- Spouse: Mary Ann Cutler
- Relatives: Appleton family
- Profession: Politician, Banker, Merchant

William Appleton (November 16, 1786 – February 15, 1862) was an American businessman and politician from Massachusetts. He was a trader, shipowner, and banker, and served as a U.S. representative from Massachusetts from 1851 to 1855, and again from 1861 to 1862.

== Early life ==
Appleton was born in Brookfield, Massachusetts, the son of a minister, the Reverend Joseph Appleton, who died when he was nine. He attended schools in New Ipswich, New Hampshire, Francestown, New Hampshire, and Tyngsborough, Massachusetts. At fifteen years of age he started work at a country store in Temple, New Hampshire. Three years later the owner took him into partnership, but a year after that he moved to Boston, Massachusetts.

== Career ==
He worked for a store that bought and sold goods from the West Indies, and went into business for himself in 1807. In 1809, he bought a ship, and made several profitable trading voyages to Europe. After the War of 1812, he expanded his shipping business and became one of the wealthiest men in Boston. In 1818, Appleton purchased 50 shares of the Suffolk Bank, a clearinghouse bank on State Street in Boston. In 1826, he retired from business, but maintained a counting-house. In 1832, he became president of the Boston branch of the Second Bank of the United States, and served until 1836. He was also at one time president of the Provident Institution for Savings.

In 1841, he established William Appleton and Company in partnership with his son James and Samuel Hooper to conduct shipping and trading operations. They engaged in the California hide trade, and in commerce with China. He retired from the company in 1859.

He was noted for benevolence toward public causes: he was president of Massachusetts General Hospital, to which he donated $30,000, and made other large donations.

=== Political career ===
In 1850, Appleton was elected U.S. Representative from Massachusetts's 1st district as a Whig. He was re-elected in 1852, this time from Massachusetts's 5th district, as districts had been redrawn after the 1850 census. He was defeated for re-election in 1854, and lost again in 1856.

In 1860, he was again elected Representative, as a Constitutional Unionist. He took his seat in 1861, but resigned in September, due to failing health.

Appleton died five months after his resignation, on February 15, 1862, in Longwood, Massachusetts. He was interred in Mount Auburn Cemetery in Cambridge, Massachusetts.

== Personal life ==
Appleton was married to Mary Ann Cutler (1794–1860), daughter of James Cutler (1767–1799) and Mehitable Sullivan (1772–1847). Mary Ann's maternal grandfather was James Sullivan, the 7th Governor of Massachusetts. Together, they were the parents of:

- William Sullivan Appleton (1815–1836)
- James Amory Appleton (1818–1843), who married Mary Ellen Lyman (1819–1875)
- Sarah Elizabeth Appleton (1822–1891), who married Amos Adams Lawrence (1814–1886), son of Amos Lawrence
- Francis Henry Appleton (1823–1854), who married Georgiana Crowninshield Silsbee (1824–1901), daughter of Nathaniel Silsbee and sister of Nathaniel Silsbee, Jr.
- William Joseph Warren Appleton (1825–1877), who married Emily Warren (1818–1905), daughter of surgeon John Collins Warren
- Edward H. Appleton (1827–1827)
- Harriet Cutler Appleton (1828–1857), who married Franklin Gordon Dexter (1824–1903)
- Hetty Sullivan Appleton (1831–1901), who married Thomas Jefferson Coolidge (1831–1920)
- Charles Hook Appleton (1833–1874), who married Isabella Mason (1835–1869)

His diaries were published in 1922 entitled Selections from the diaries of William Appleton, 1786-1862. Appleton was the first cousin of U.S. Representative Nathan Appleton, and first cousin, once removed, of writer and artist Thomas Gold Appleton. William served as treasurer in cousin Nathan's Appleton Mills in Lowell, MA.

U.S. House of Representatives
Preceded by Samuel A. Eliot	Member of the U.S. House of Representatives from Massachusetts's 1st congressional district March 4, 1851 – March 3, 1853	Succeeded by Zeno Scudder
Preceded by Charles Allen	Member of the U.S. House of Representatives from Massachusetts's 5th congressional district March 4, 1853 – March 3, 1855	Succeeded by Anson Burlingame
Preceded by Anson Burlingame	Member of the U.S. House of Representatives from Massachusetts's 5th congressional district March 4, 1861 – September 27, 1861	Succeeded by Samuel Hooper
