= Emily Appleton (philanthropist) =

American animal rights activist (1818–1905)

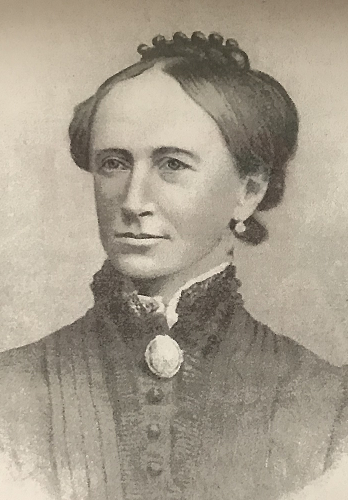
- Born: Emily Warren; May 10, 1818; Boston, Massachusetts
- Died: May 29, 1905 (aged 87); Boston, Massachusetts
- Occupations: philanthropist, activist
- Spouse: William Appleton (m. 1845)
- Relatives: John Collins Warren (father); John Collins Warren (nephew); William Appleton (father-in-law)

Emily Appleton (née Warren; May 10, 1818 – May 29, 1905) was an American philanthropist and animal welfare activist from Boston who provided financial support for the foundation of the Massachusetts Society for the Prevention of Cruelty to Animals in 1868.

Appleton was already nurturing an American anti-animal cruelty movement when she saw a letter in the Boston Daily Advertiser from George Thorndike Angell protesting animal cruelty. Within a month, with Appleton's backing, Angell incorporated the society. Appleton, like fellow female activist Caroline Earle White (who was active in Philadelphia), was excluded from executive participation in the society she helped found.

She was the daughter of noted surgeon John Collins Warren, who founded the New England Journal of Medicine, and his first wife, Susan Mason. She married William Appleton, son of politician William Appleton in 1845. They had one daughter, also named Emily. After her death in 1905, she left bequests to many charitable organizations, including a further bequest of $20,000 (equivalent to $717,000 in 2025) to the MSPCA. She also left $10,000 to the Episcopal Church missionary society; $5,000 each to the Widows' Society of Boston, the Women's Union Missionary Society of America, the Kindergarten for the Blind in Massachusetts, the Episcopal City Mission of Boston and the Instructive District Nursing Association; and $2,000 to the Massachusetts Charitable Eye and Ear Infirmary.
