= James E. Cooley =

American politician

James Ewing Cooley (1802 – August 19, 1882 Bagni di Lucca, Italy) was a New York City bookseller, auctioneer and politician. He served in the New York State Senate for the First District in the session of 1852, and served on the advisory board which planned Central Park. He was married in 1833 to Maria Louisa Appleton, the daughter of publisher Daniel Appleton. Starting around that time under the firm name Cooley & Bangs, afterwards Cooley, Keese & Hill, he conducted the semi-annual New York City book trade sales at his auction rooms, in later years in conjunction with his son-in-law George Ayres Leavitt, who took over the business in 1866. He was the author of The American in Egypt: with Rambles Through Arabia Petraea and the Holy Land, During the Years 1839 and 1840 (New York: D. Appleton & Co., 1842). He died in 1882 at the Bagni di Lucca near Florence, Italy, where he had been residing for several years.

New York State Senate
Preceded by William Horace Brown	New York State Senate; 1st District; 1852-1853	Succeeded by Hugh Halsey
