= Frank Weston Benson =

American painter (1862–1951)

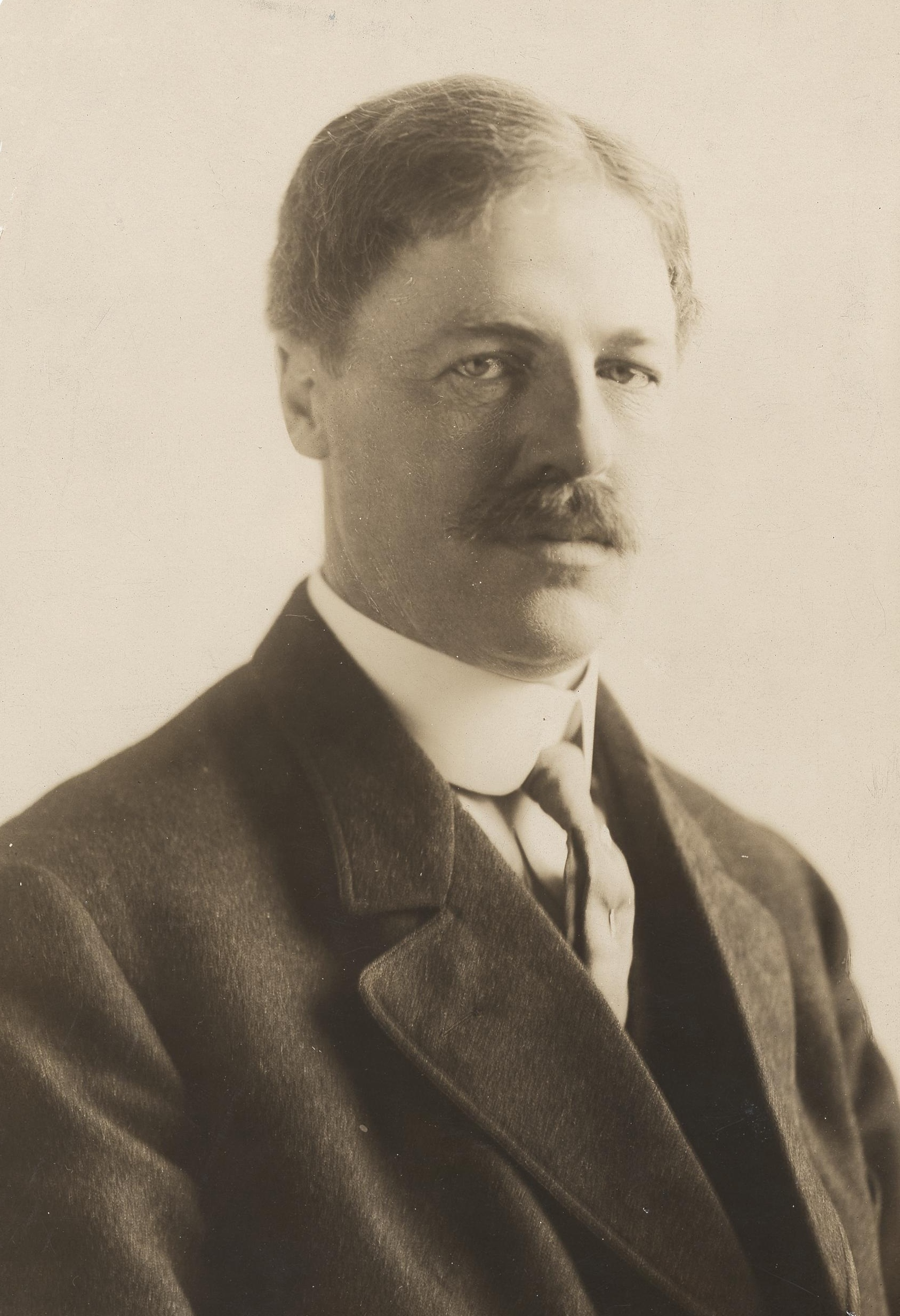
- Benson in c. 1895
- Born: March 24, 1862; Salem, Massachusetts, US
- Died: November 15, 1951 (aged 89); Salem, Massachusetts, US
- Education: School of the Museum of Fine Arts, Boston, Académie Julian Paris
- Known for: Impressionist painting

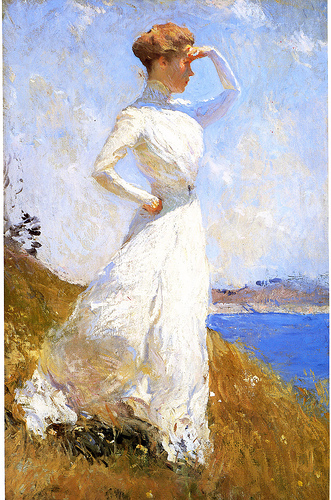
Summer (1909)

Frank Weston Benson, frequently referred to as Frank W. Benson, (March 24, 1862 – November 15, 1951) was an American artist from Salem, Massachusetts, known for his Realistic portraits, American Impressionist paintings, watercolors and etchings. He began his career painting portraits of distinguished families and murals for the Library of Congress. Some of his best known paintings (Eleanor, Museum of Fine Arts, Boston; Summer, Rhode Island School of Design Museum) depict his daughters outdoors at Benson's summer home, Wooster Farm, on the island of North Haven, Maine. He also produced numerous oil, wash and watercolor paintings and etchings of wildfowl and landscapes.

In 1880, Benson began to study at the School of the Museum of Fine Arts, Boston under both Otto Grundmann and Frederic Crowninshield. In 1883 he travelled to Paris to study at the Académie Julian. He enjoyed a distinguished career as an instructor and department head at the School of the Museum of Fine Arts, Boston. He was a founding member of the Ten American Painters, American Academy of Arts and Letters and The Guild of Boston Artists.

== Early life ==
Frank Weston Benson was born to George Wiggin Benson, a successful cotton broker, and Elisabeth Poole, from families who founded Salem, Massachusetts. Benson obtained his appreciation of the sea from his grandfather, Captain Samuel Benson. When he was 12, he was given a sailboat in which he explored the waterways and marshes and raced against his brother, John Prentiss Benson. To encourage educational activity, Benson's parents gave their children a weekly allowance to foster independent study and hobbies, such as Salem's Hamilton Hall dance classes, Lyceum lectures or equipment for photography. The brothers kept active by participating in sports, as well as fishing and hunting.

Benson's father gave him a shotgun and taught him how to hunt shore birds along the North Shore and wildfowl in the local fields and marshes. He spent nearly all of his weekends hunting or fishing in the fields, marshes and streams. To his good friend Dan Henderson, he wrote of their childhood adventures:

"We used to spend our Saturdays chasing coot and old squaws in Salem Harbor. Then, after working hard all day to get one bird, in we would assemble at Sam Shrum’s or mine and chew the rag until we were so sleepy we could not hold up our heads. What a minute account each had to give of each movement of every bird seen and every shot missed. It was almost criminal to miss an easy shot in those days, so many excuses had to be invented. One word would have served for all in my case if it had been invented then, I was generally 'rattled,' I think, when you and I went ducking."

His brother, John Prentiss Benson, was an architect and painter in his own right. Both sons may have been influenced by their mother, Elisabeth Poole Benson, who Frank once remarked, had "a little room" on the top floor of their house where she would go to paint and "forget about the rest of the world".

=== Artistic studies ===
An avid birdwatcher and wildfowl hunter, Benson wanted to be an ornithological illustrator. At the age of 16, he painted Rail, one of his first oil paintings, after a hunting trip. He began his studies at the School of the Museum of Fine Arts, Boston in 1880, and there befriended Joseph Lindon Smith, Robert Reid and Edmund Charles Tarbell. Capitalizing on what he learned, Benson held drawing classes in Salem and painted landscapes during the summer of 1882.

On Benson's 21st birthday his parents gave him a gift of $2,000 to study in Europe. He traveled to Paris and studied at the Académie Julian from 1883 to 1884 with Edmund Tarbell and Joseph Lindon Smith; Joseph Lindon Smith and Benson shared an apartment. At the Academy, Benson studied under Jules-Joseph Lefebvre, William Turner Dannat, and Gustave Boulanger. Gustave Boulanger, one of Benson's teachers at Académie Julian, said to him: "Young man, your career is in your hands... you will do very well." After his study at Académie Julian, Benson traveled to England's Royal Academy to see his painting "After the Storm" on exhibit. He also spent time in Italy, Belgium, Germany, and Brittany.

Rail, c. 1878–1879, Private collection

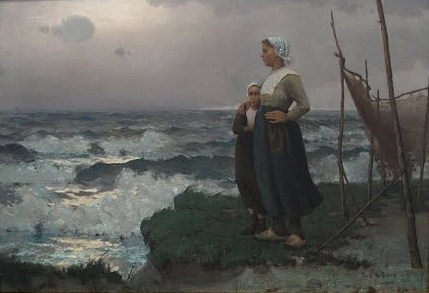
After the Storm, 1884, Private collection

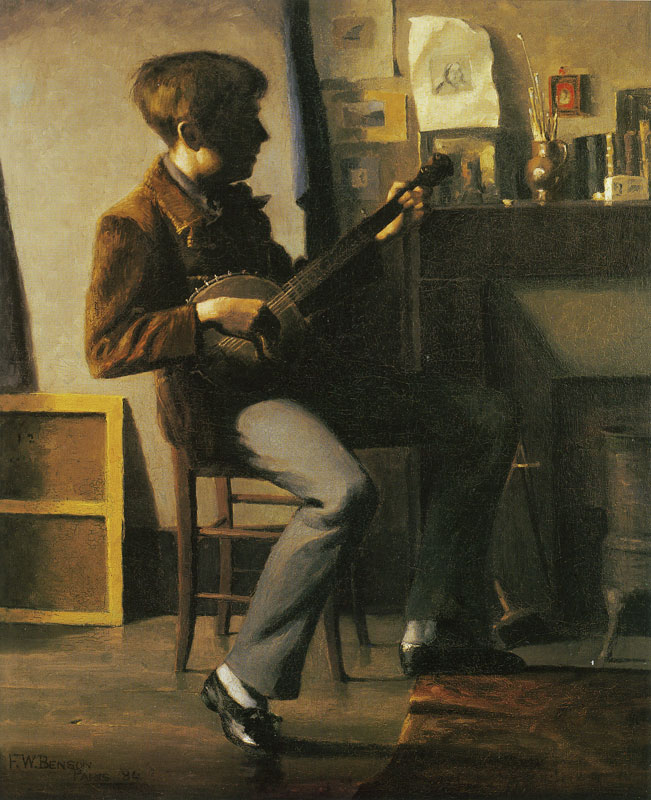
Portrait of Joseph Lindon Smith, 1884, Private collection

== Influences ==
Benson was "deeply influenced" by Johannes Vermeer and Diego Velázquez, masters from the seventeenth-century. Vermeer painted few works during his lifetime, about 35-36 [universally accepted] paintings, but nearly each of them has become a masterpiece. The Dutch artist from Delft was astute in his depiction of light and "poetic quality" of his subjects.

Influences

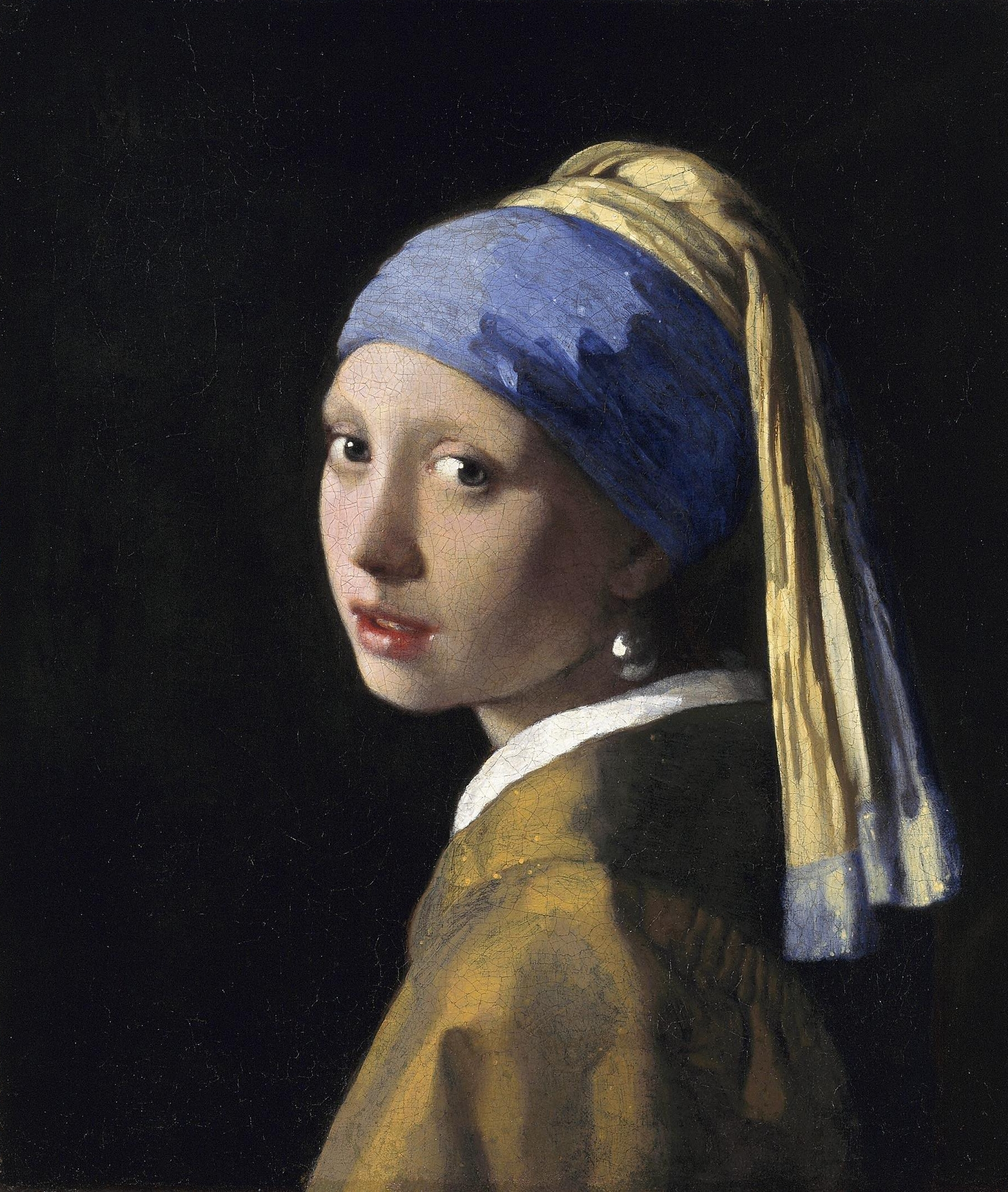
Johannes Vermeer, Girl with a Pearl Earring, ca. 1660–1670, Royal Picture Gallery Mauritshuis, The Hague

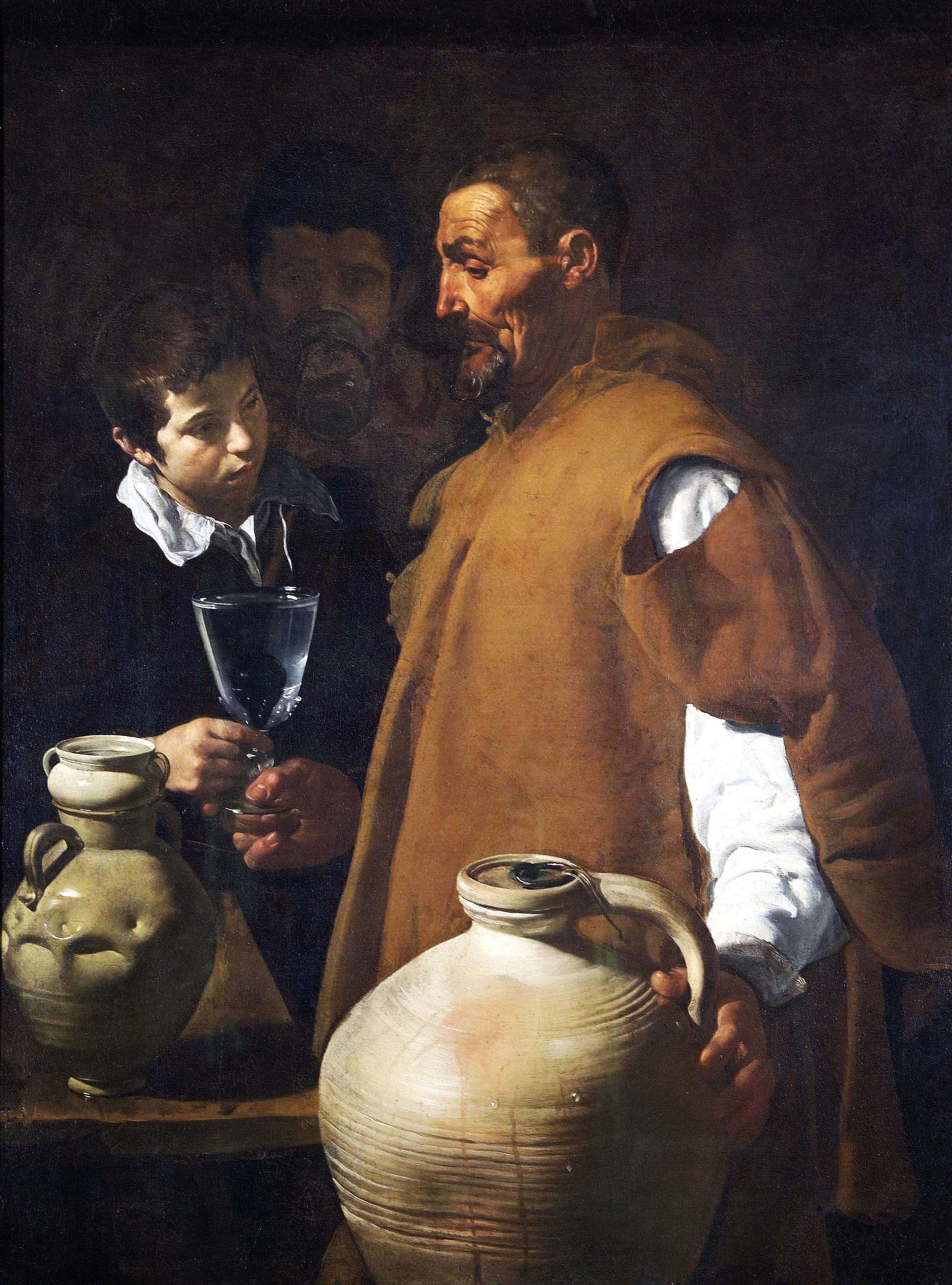
Diego Velázquez, The Waterseller of Seville, 1623, Apsley House, London

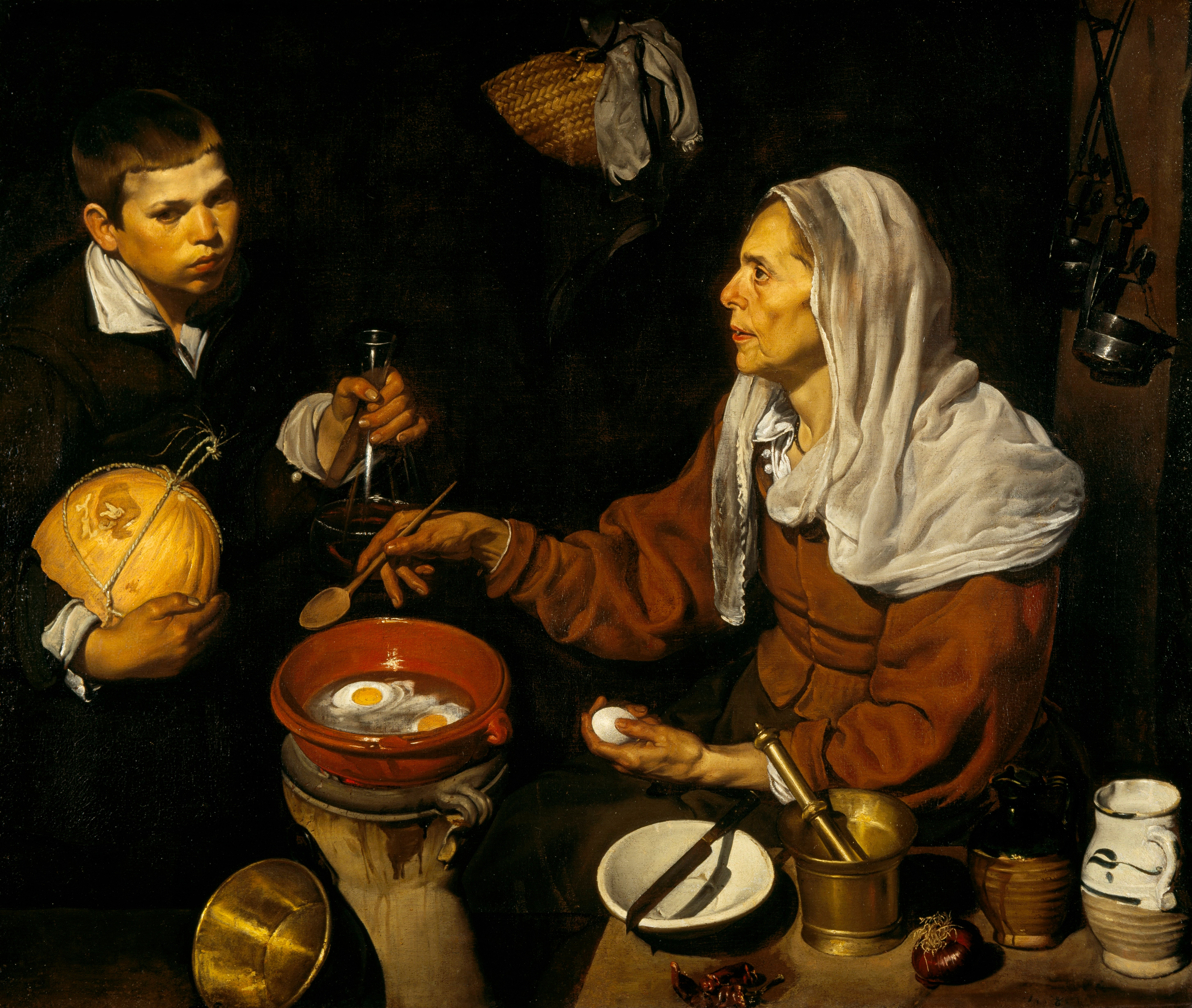
Diego Velázquez, Old Woman Frying Eggs, 1618, National Gallery of Scotland, Edinburgh.

Impressionism, particularly the work of Claude Monet, played a role in the development of Benson's own American Impressionistic style. He capitalized on Monet's color palette and brush strokes and keenly depicted "reflected light", yet maintained some detail in the composition. Per Chambers, Benson represented American people with an "ideal of grace, of dignity, of elegance."

Influences from Impressionism

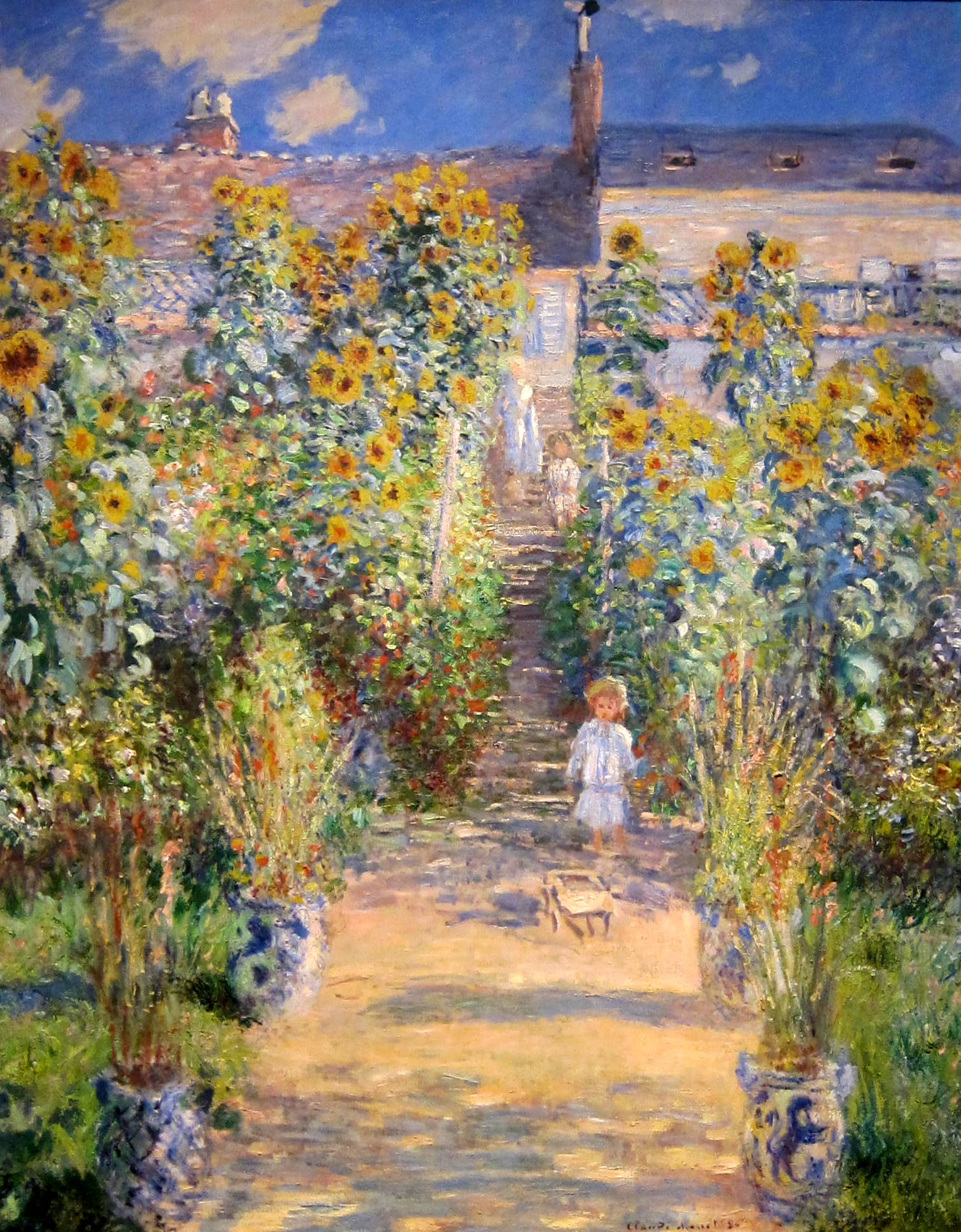
Claude Monet, The Artist's Garden at Vétheuil, 1880, National Gallery of Art, Washington D.C.

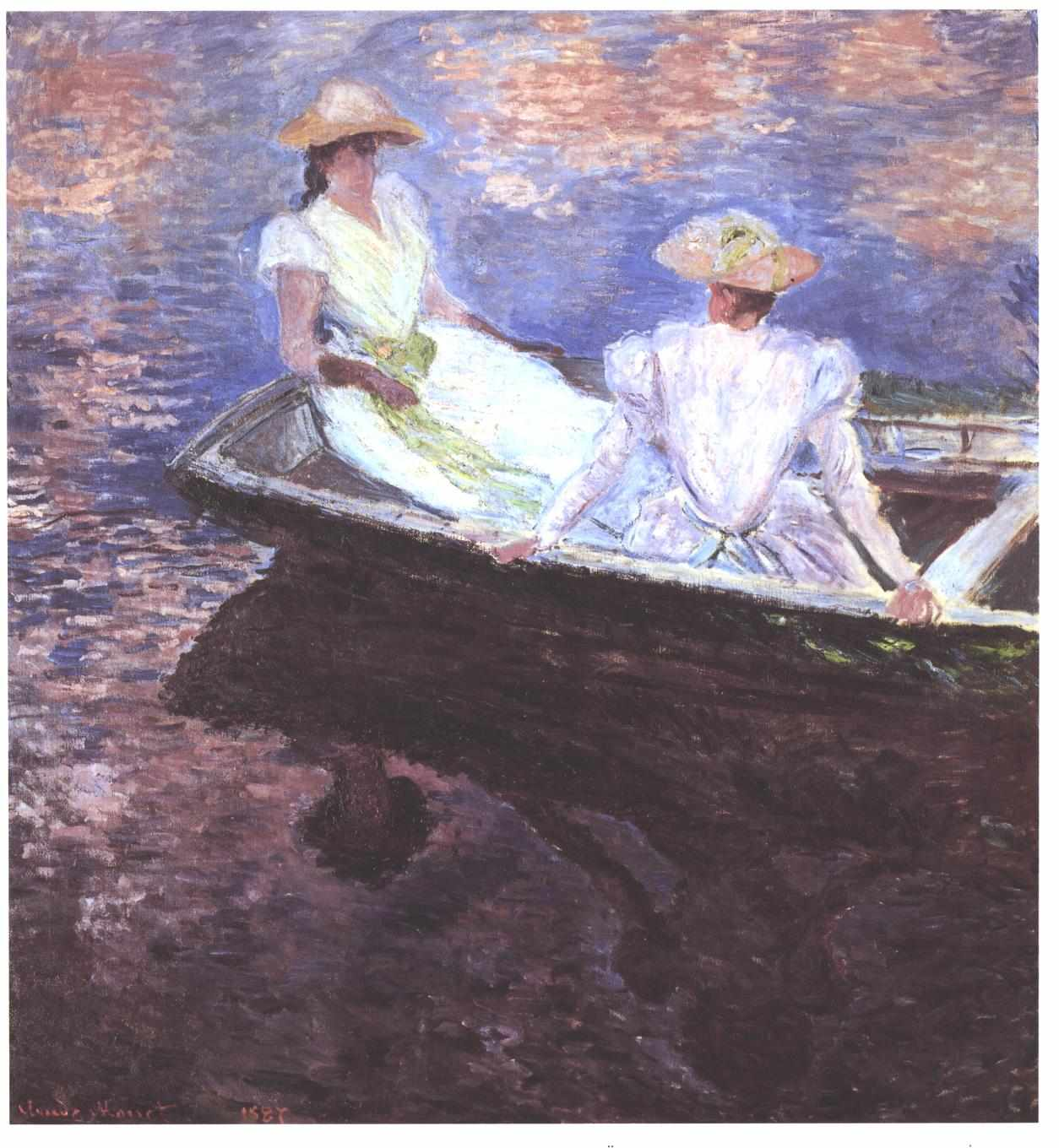
Claude Monet, Two Girls in a Boat

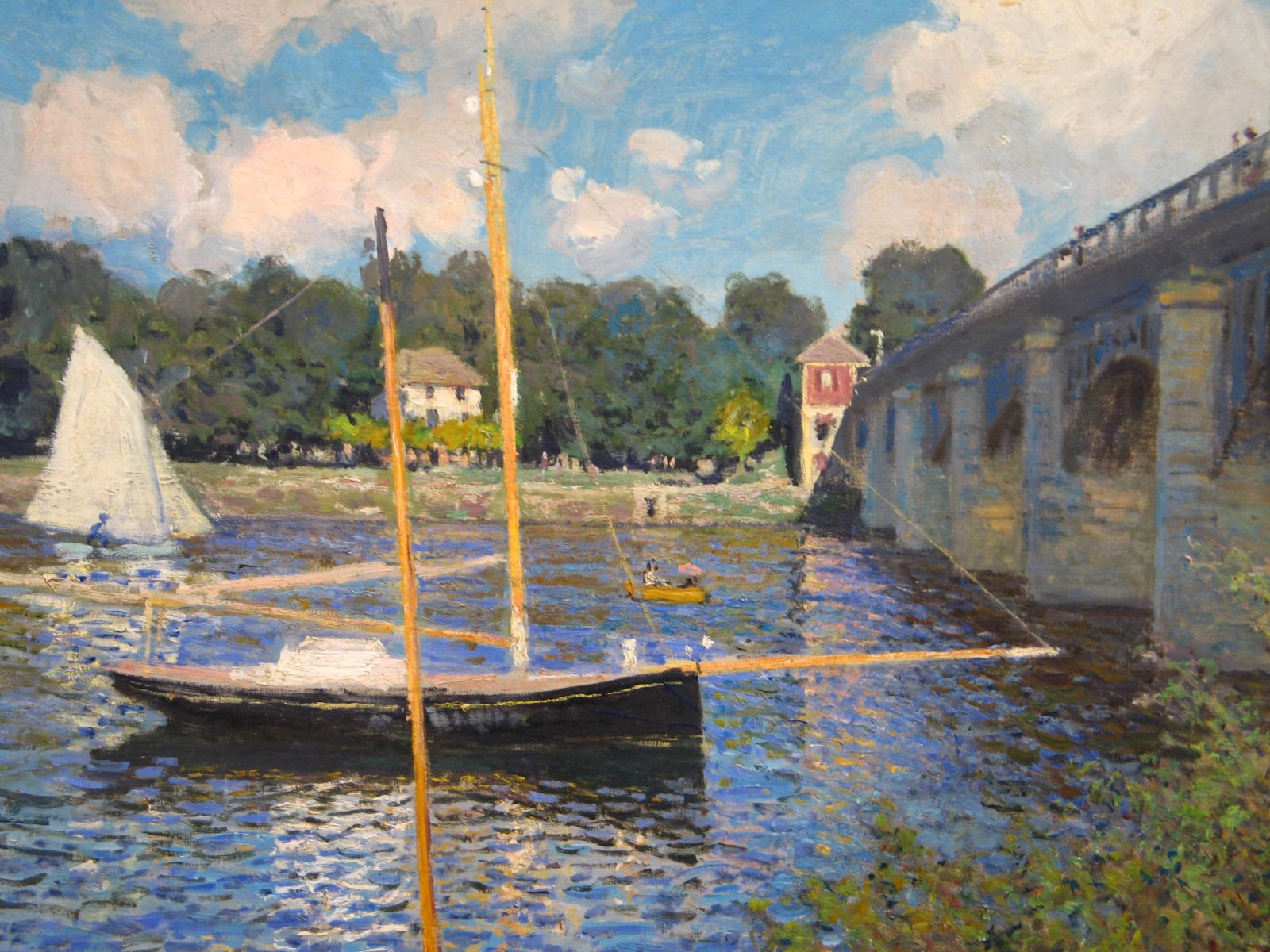
Claude Monet, Pont d'Argenteuil

Benson's watercolors reminded some critics of Winslow Homer's works.

Influences from Winslow Homer

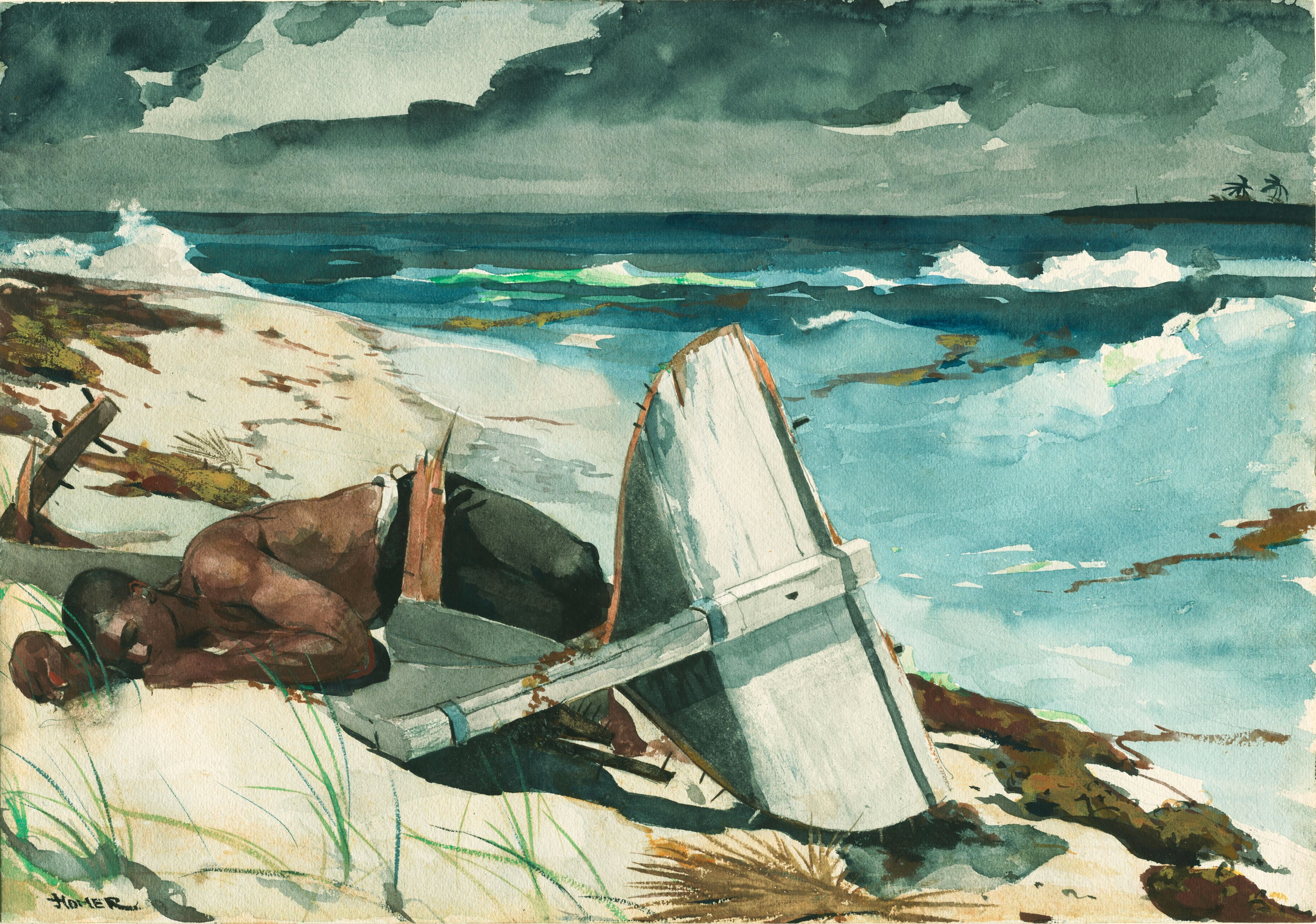
Winslow Homer, After the Tornado, watercolor, 1899, Art Institute of Chicago

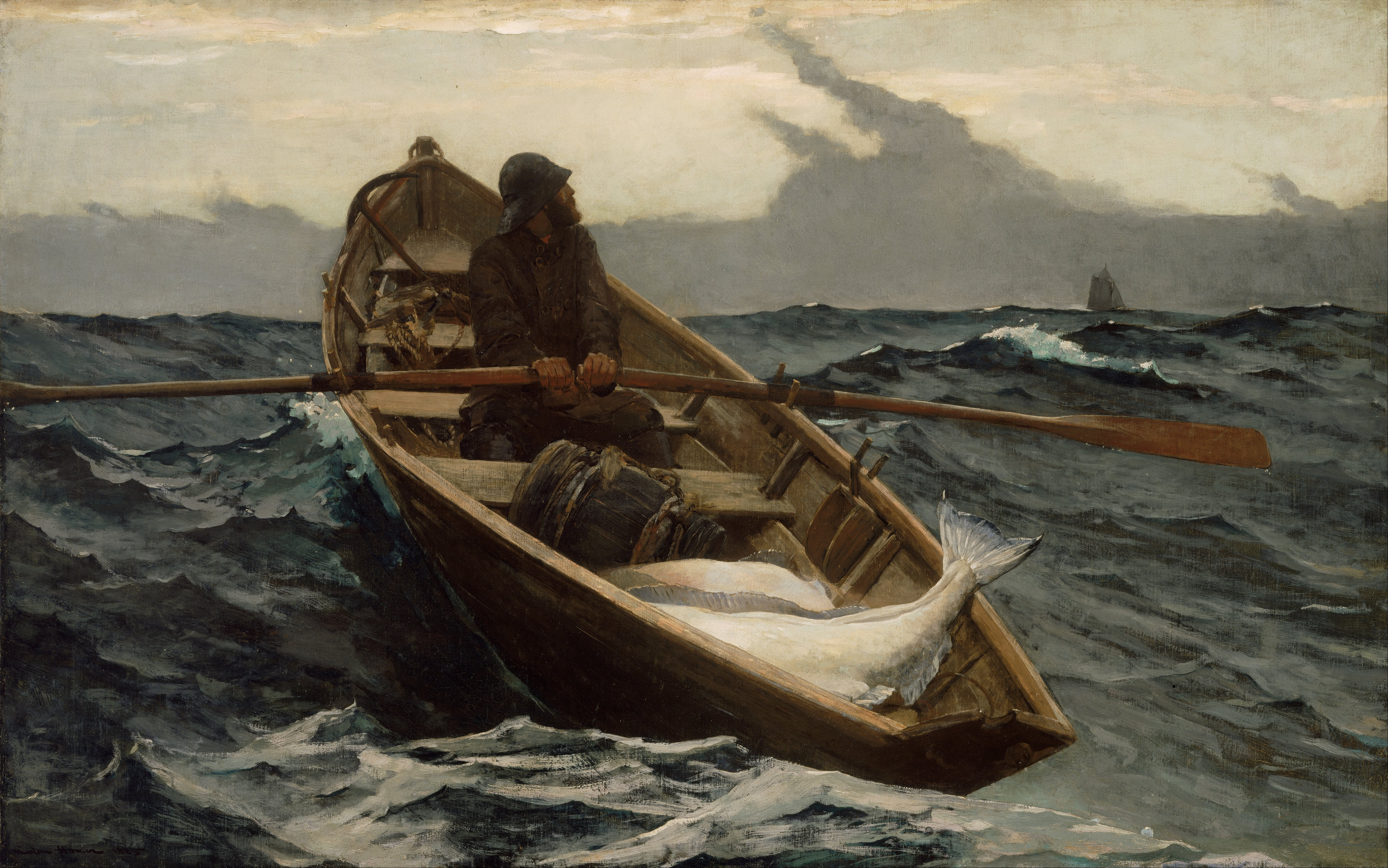
Winslow Homer, The Fog Warning, oil, 1885, Museum of Fine Arts, Boston

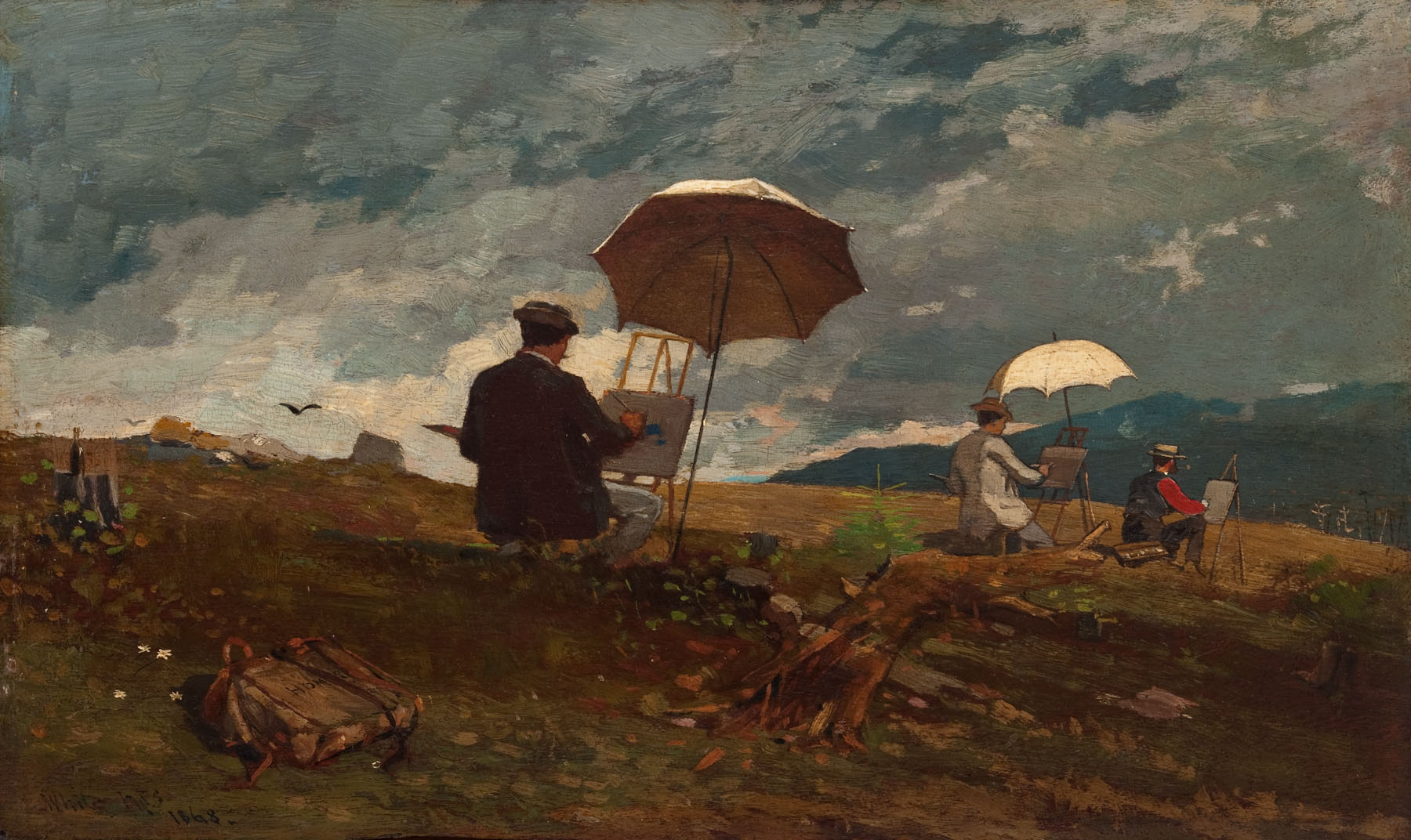
Winslow Homer, oil, Artists Sketching in the White Mountains, 1868, Portland Museum of Art

Works of his friends:

Influences from the works of his friends

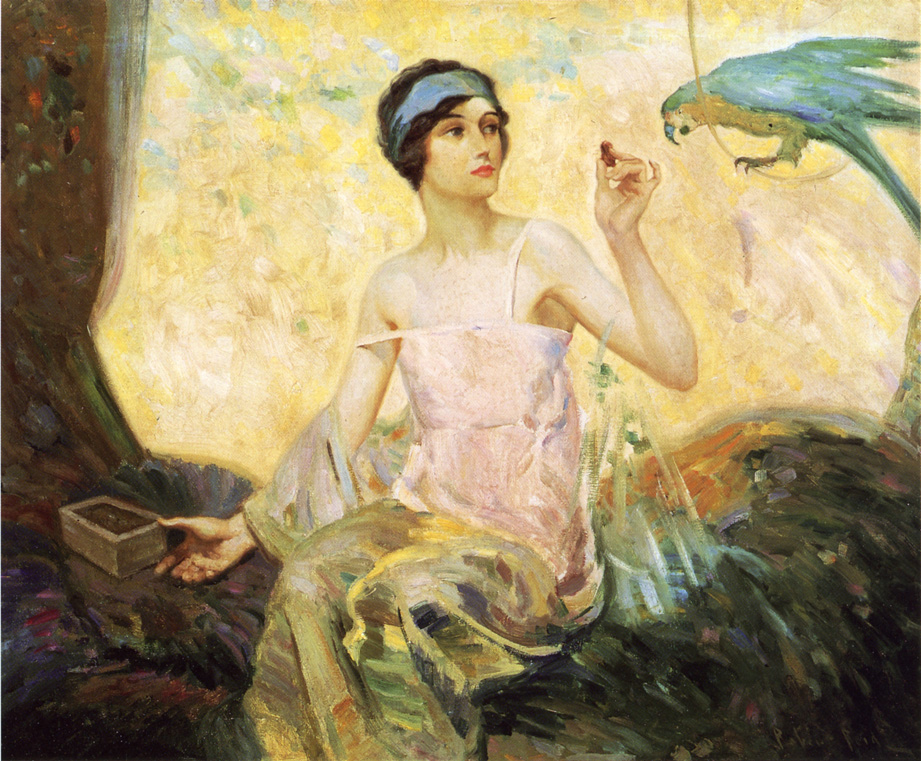
Robert Reid,Tempting Sweets

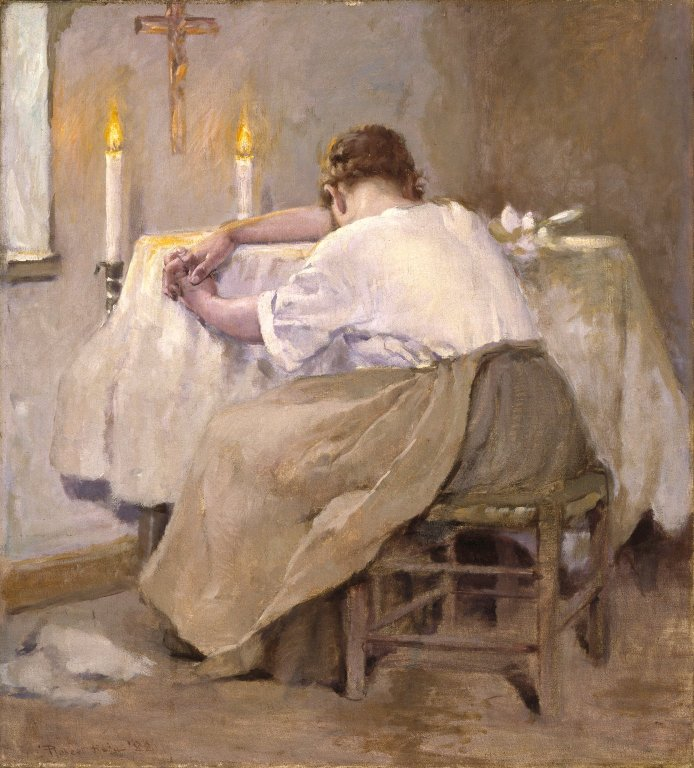
Robert Reid,Her First Born, 1888, Brooklyn Museum

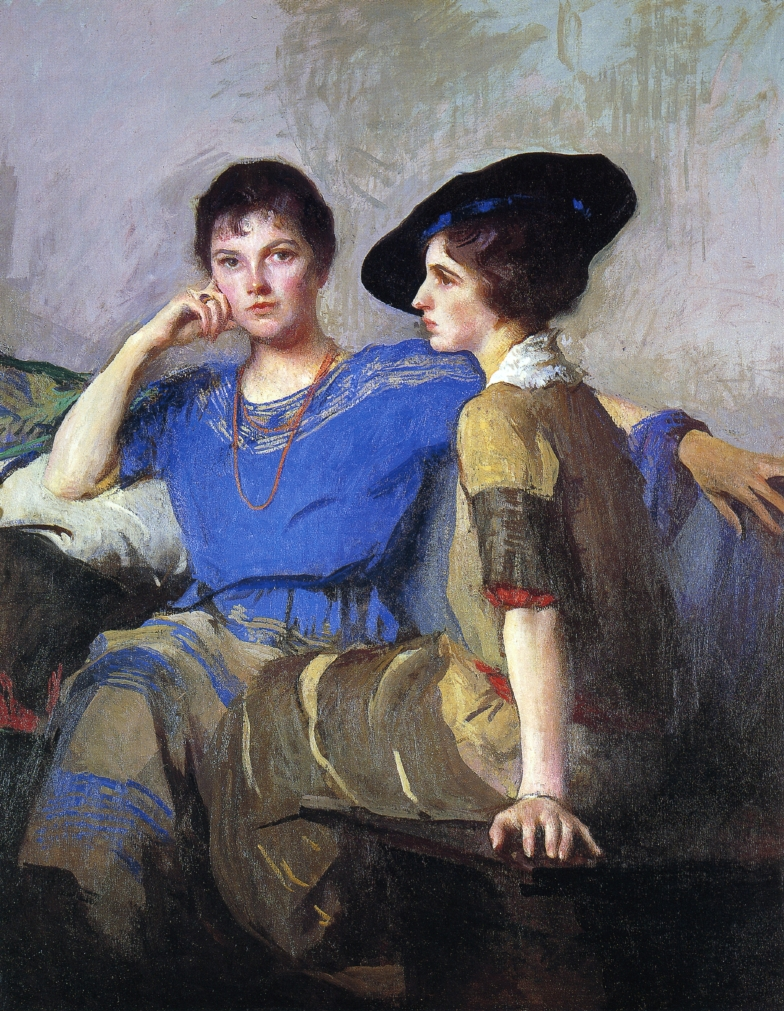
Edmund Tarbell, The Sisters, 1921, Gibbes Museum of Art, Charleston, South Carolina

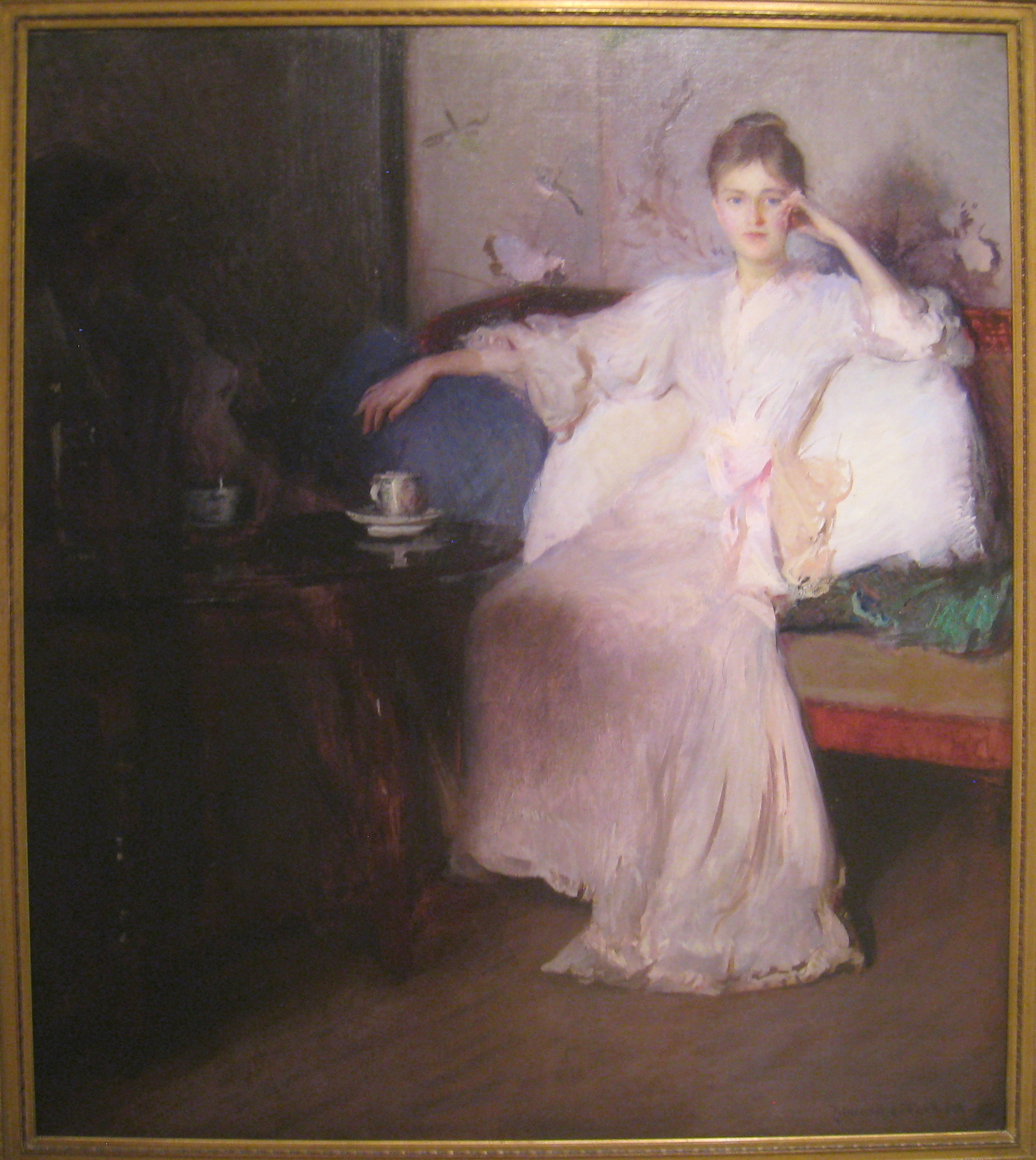
Edmund Tarbell, Arrangement in Pink and Gray (Afternoon Tea), ca. 1894, Worcester Art Museum

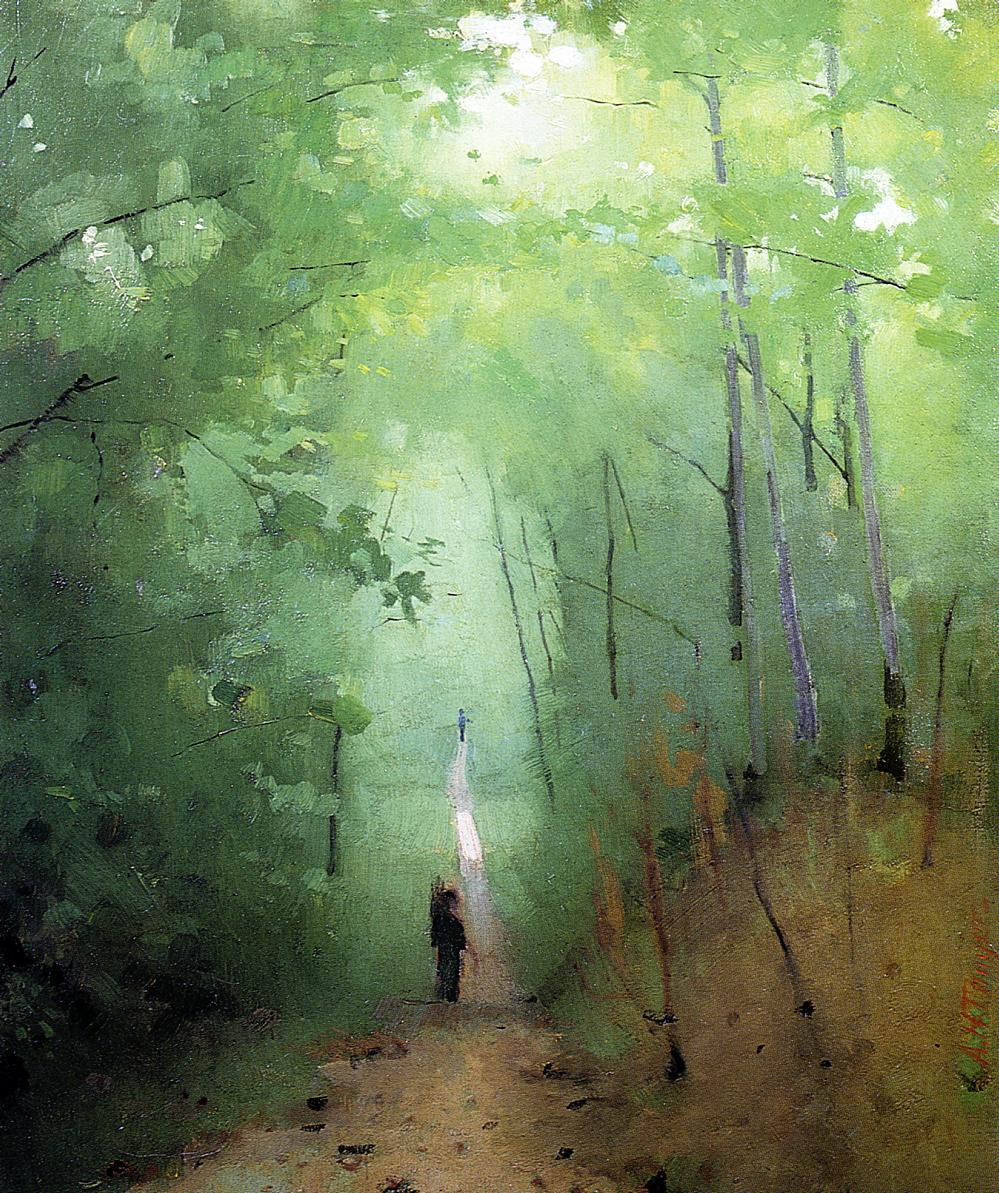
Abbott Thayer, Landscape at Fontainbleau Forest, 1876

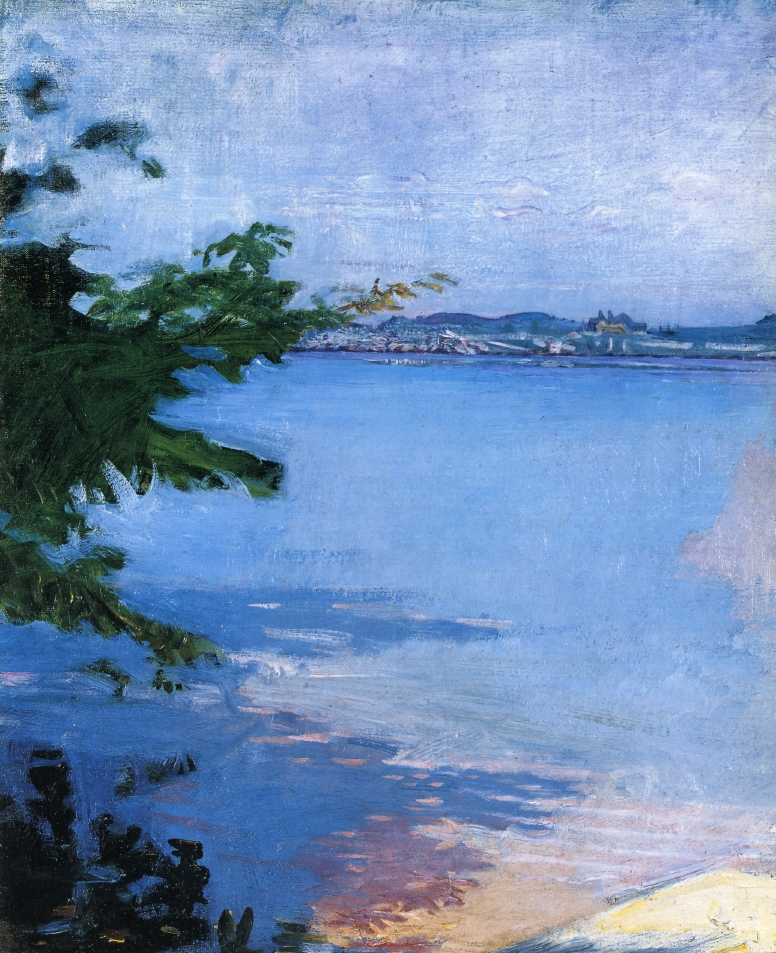
Abbott Thayer, Dublin Pond, 1894

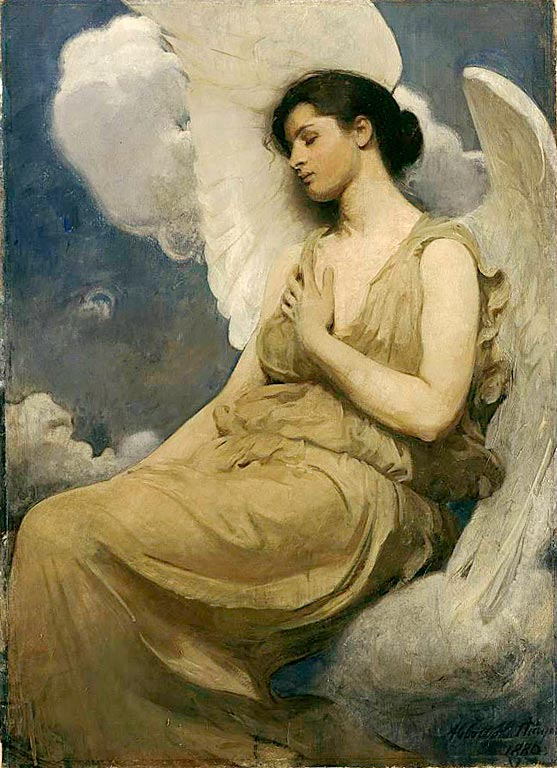
Abbott Thayer, Winged Figure, 1889, Art Institute of Chicago

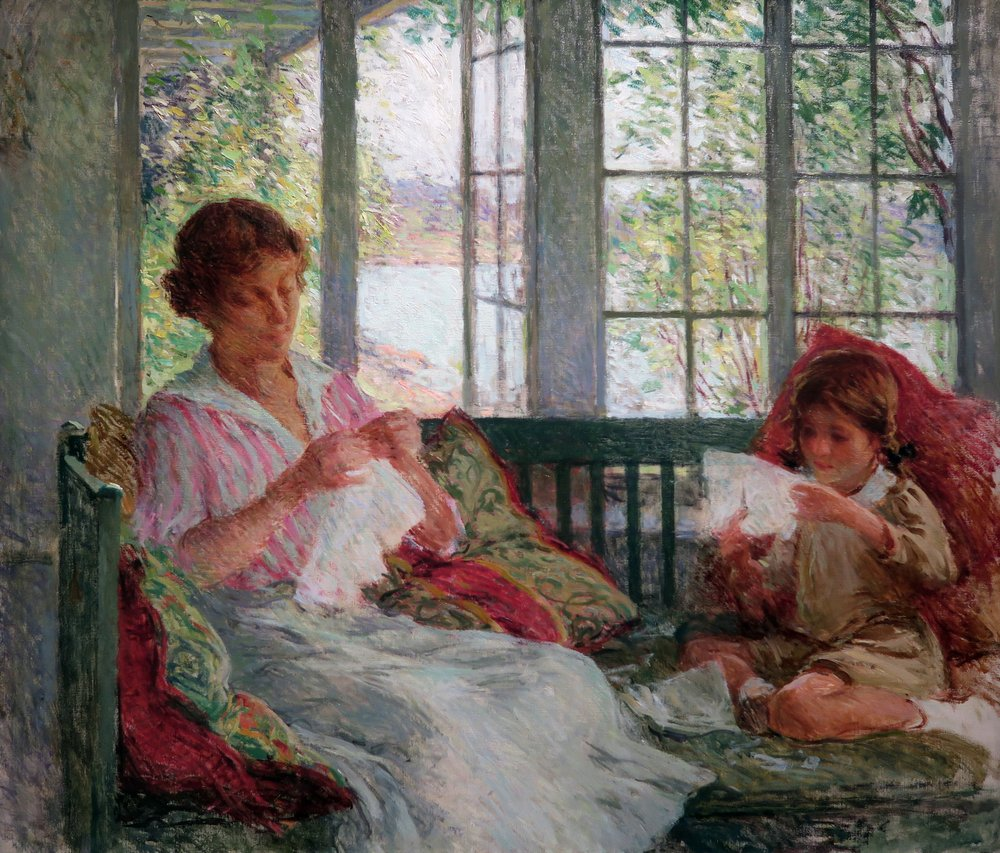
Willard Metcalf, My Wife and Daughter, ca. 1917

Benson was not one to experiment with emerging art forms, like Cubism, Expressionism and Fauvism. As American Impressionism extended to Post-Impressionism about 1913, Benson stayed with traditional genres and his American Impressionist style. As a result, "The pretty, genteel life that Benson had depicted was criticized. Benson's reaction was to turn to nature, and birds replaced the women and children as his objects of interest." said Dean Lahikainen, curator of the Peabody Essex Museum.

=== Marriage and children ===
In the summer of 1884 Benson painted at Concarneau, along with Willard Metcalf and Edward Simmons. While there, Benson became engaged to the daughter of friends from Salem, Massachusetts, Ellen Perry Peirson. They married in 1888 when Benson had established himself in his career and raised four children: Eleanor (born 1890), George (born 1891), Elisabeth (born 1892) and Sylvia (born 1898).

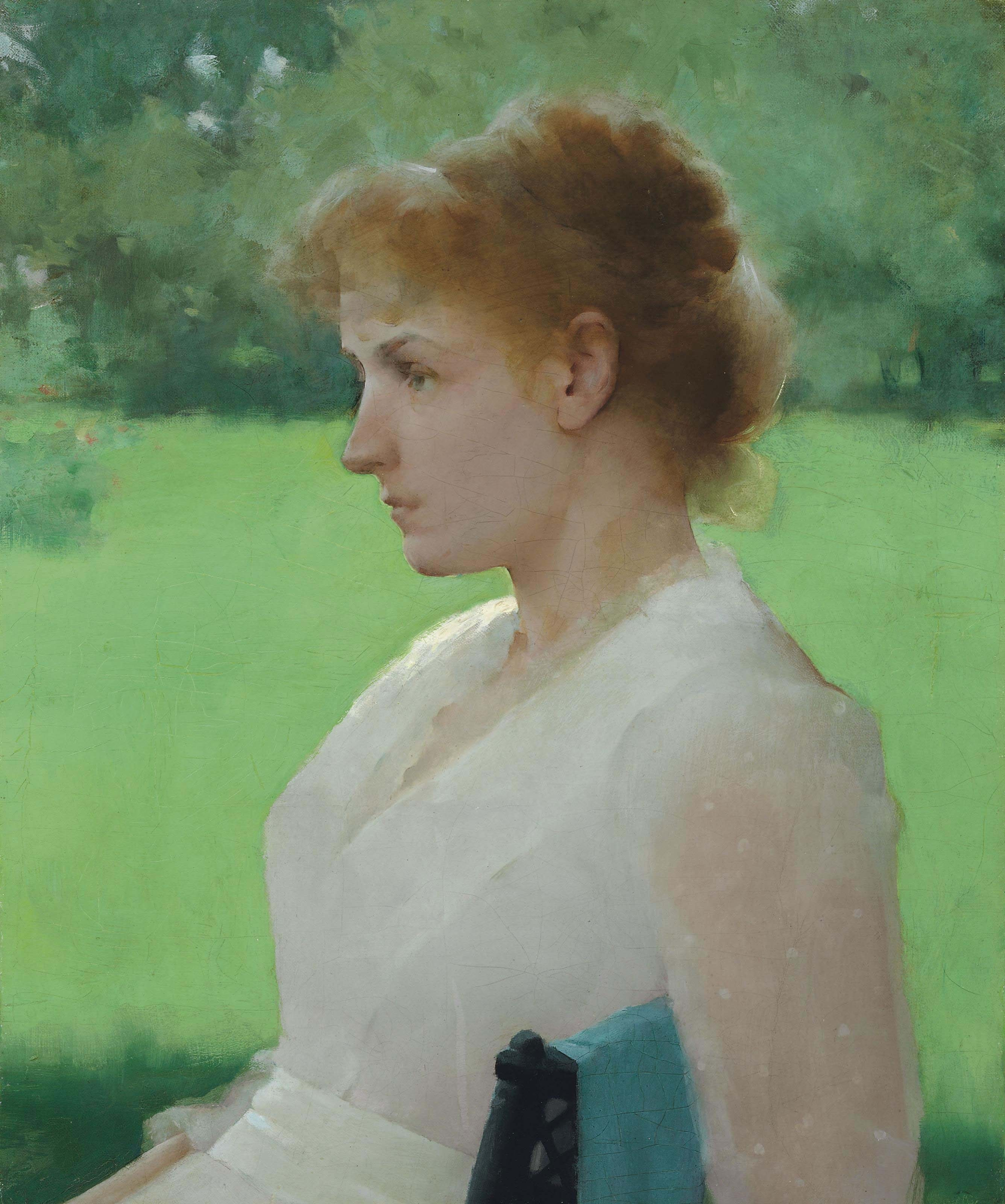
In Summer, 1887, Private collection. Portrait of Ellen Perry Peirson.

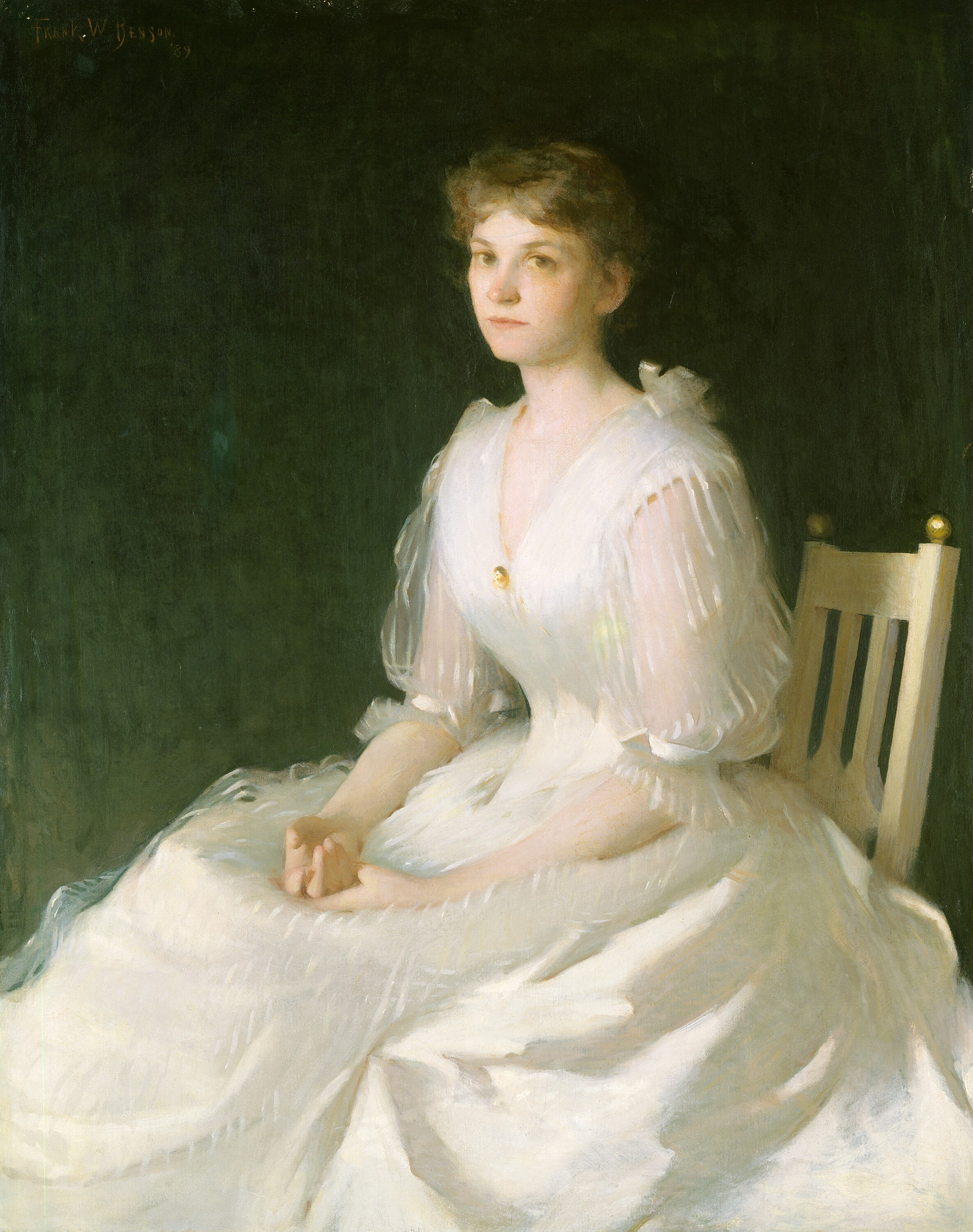
Portrait of My Wife, 1889, National Gallery of Art, Washington D.C.

=== Instructor ===
Benson became a Portland, Maine, School of Art instructor in 1886. The spring of 1889 he began teaching antique drawing at the School of the Museum of Fine Arts, Boston and in 1890 became head of the Painting department. The school's reputation grew and its enrollment tripled under the leadership of Philip Hale, Benson and Edmund C. Tarbell. Students were assessed on the basis of their skill and placed at the appropriate level (from low to high): Hale had a class for beginners, Benson concentrated on how to depict figures while Tarbell covered still lifes. Benson, a favored instructor called "Cher Maitre" ("Dear Master") by his students, taught until 1913. Among his pupils were the portraitist Marie Danforth Page and the miniaturist Bertha Coolidge.

== Works ==
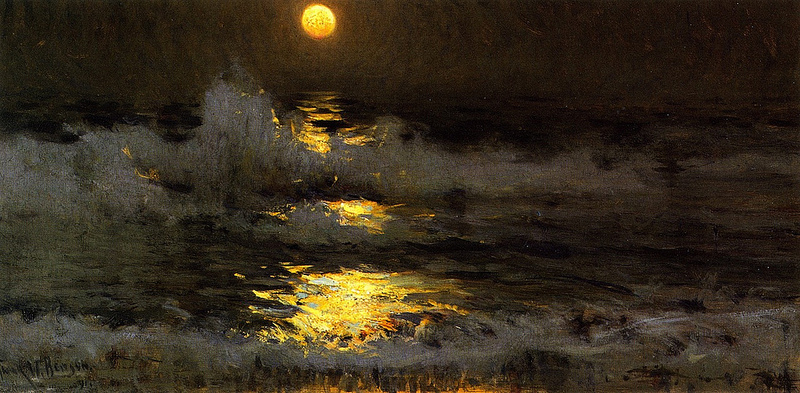
Moonlight on the Waters oil 1899

William H. Gerdts, art historian, wrote of Benson's work in his introduction to Faith Andrews Bedford's biography of the painter: "Frank Benson painted some of the most beautiful pictures ever executed by an American artist. They are images alive with reflections of youth and optimism, projecting a way of life at once innocent and idealized and yet resonant with a sense of certain, selective realities of contemporary times." His work was also part of the art competitions at the 1932 Summer Olympics and the 1936 Summer Olympics.

=== Realism ===
Benson opened his first studio in Salem in 1886 with his friend, Phillip Little, and began painting portraits, an occupation in which Benson took seriously. He once said: "The more a painter knows about his subject, the more he studies and understands it, the more the true nature of it is perceived by whoever looks at it, even though it is extremely subtle and not easy to see or understand. A painter must search deeply into the aspects of a subject, must know and understand it thoroughly before he can represent it well."

Benson took a Boston studio in 1888 with Edmund C. Tarbell. He gained favorable attention in his first showing at the Society of American Artists in New York, with a piece that suggested the influence of academic Realism.

At the suggestion of his friend Joseph Lindon Smith, Benson spent several summers in Dublin from 1889 to 1893, where he painted with and was influenced by Abbott Thayer. By the early 1890s he began using his family as subjects. Benson later recalled it was then that he realized design was the most important component of painting. Consequently, works of the period evidence a greater interest in and command of pattern, silhouette, and abstract design.

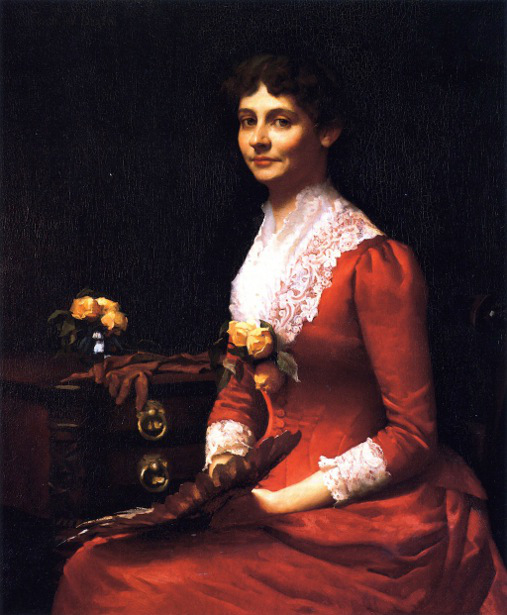
Portrait of Margaret Washburn, 1886, Private collection

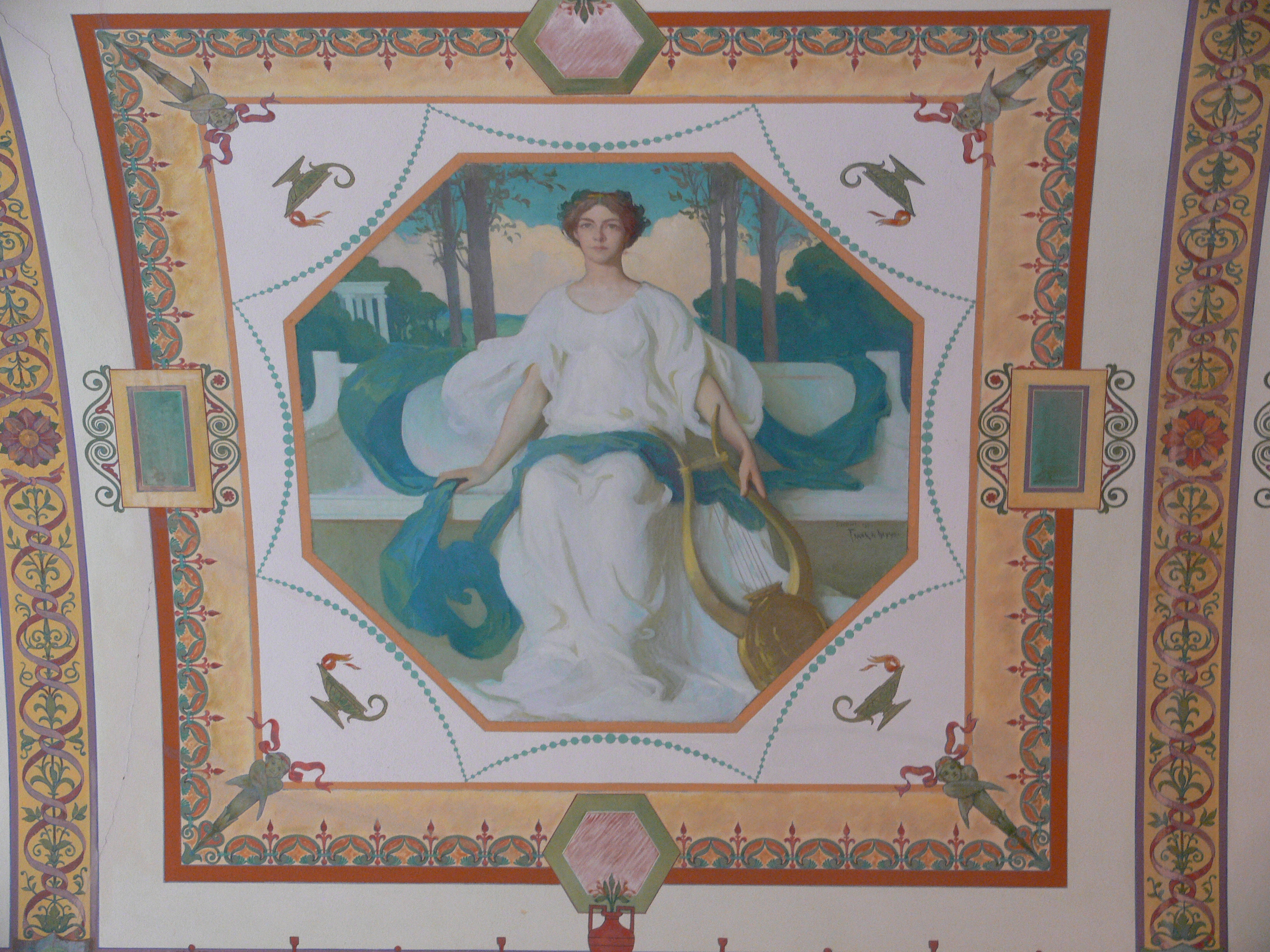
The Graces: Thalia, mural, 1900, Library of Congress, Washington, D. C.

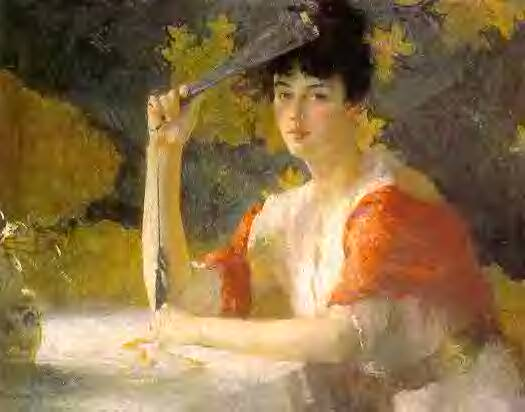
Red and Gold, 1915, Butler Institute of American Art, Youngstown, Ohio

=== Impressionism ===
It was only after joining the "Ten American Painters" in 1898 that Benson shifted from the decorative painting of murals (for the Library of Congress) and allegories, to a genuine interest in plein-air Impressionism.

Continuing a pattern that the Bensons would follow for years, the family left Boston during the summers. The family spent summers in New Castle, New Hampshire from 1893 to 1900, where Benson made some of his first Impressionist paintings, such as Children in the Woods and The Sisters. The popularity of The Sisters, a painting of daughters Elizabeth and Sylvia, won medals in expositions throughout the United States and in Paris, was a prelude to the successes of the next 20 years, when Benson became famous for a series of paintings of his family. After New Castle, the Bensons spent their summers on North Haven Island in Penobscot Bay in Maine at Wooster Farm. Benson made Impressionist works of his family in earnest at Wooster Farm en plein air. The summer home afforded a great view of the bay and surrounding area. Near the house was an old orchard, large fields provided plenty of space for the children to play and for a garden, and the property stood beside a wooded area.

Like the French Impressionists, Benson focused on capturing light. To his daughter Eleanor he said, "I follow the light, where it comes from, where it goes." A critic said of Benson's work: "It is impossible to believe that mere paint, however clearly laid on, can glow and shimmer and sparkle as does that golden light on his canvas."

Through his role as a teacher, work as an artist and affiliation with professional organizations for artists, Benson was a leader in American Impressionism. In 1898 Benson and nine other artists including William Merritt Chase, Thomas Dewing, Childe Hassam, and J. Alden Weir formed "Ten American Painters". They conducted annual exhibitions of their works in New York City and often showed in other cities, such as Boston, and became known as the American Impressionists. The Traditional Fine Arts Organization claimed he was "one of the last great American Impressionists."

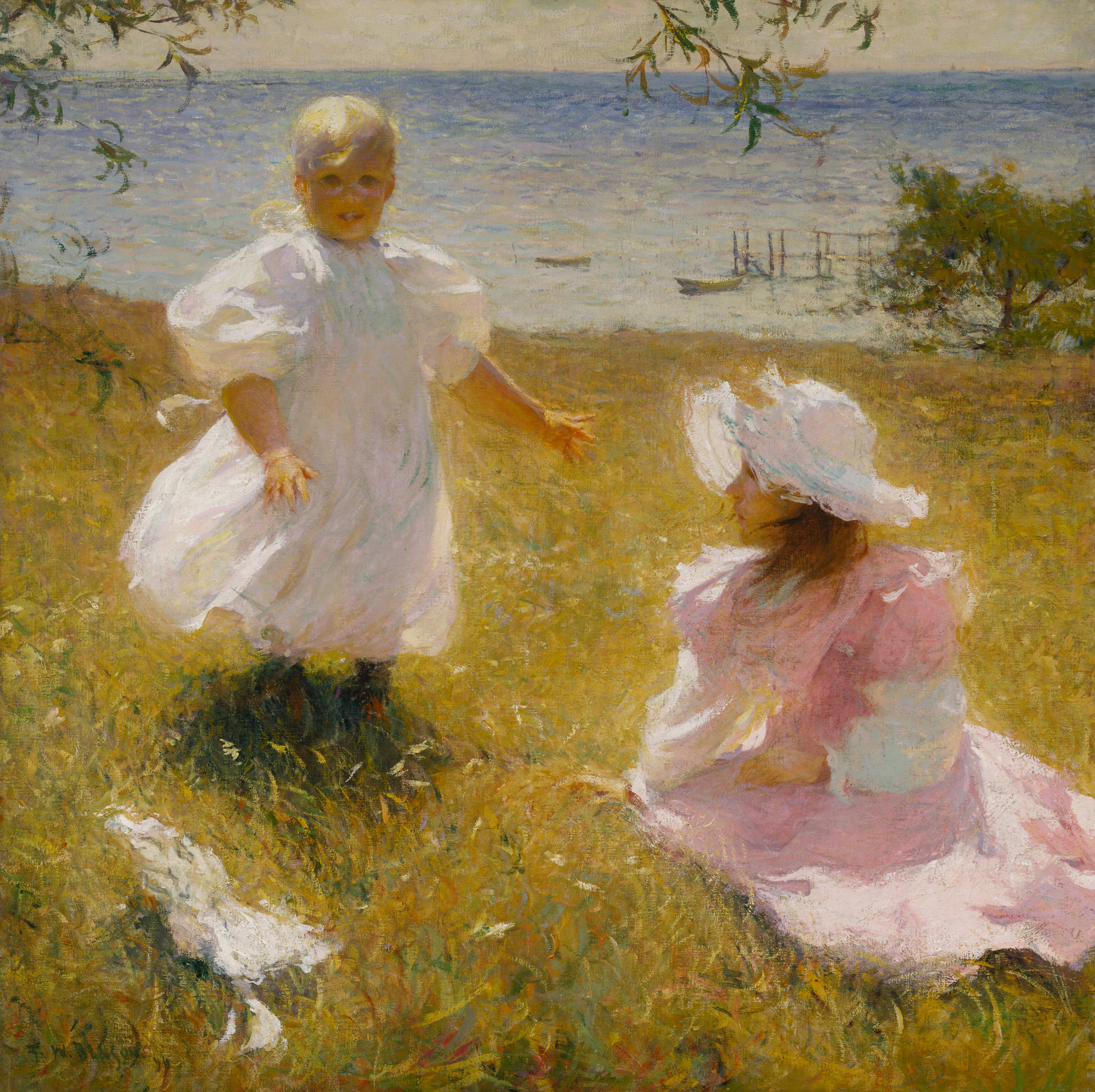
The Sisters, 1899, Terra Museum, Chicago

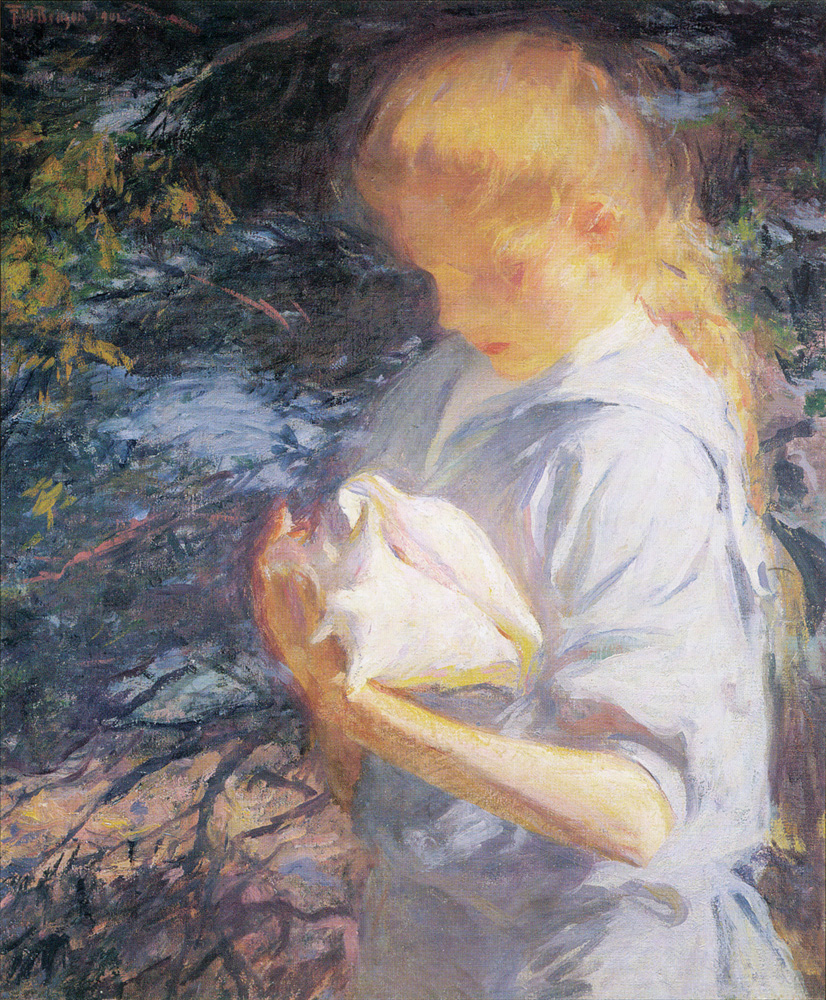
Eleanor Holding a Shell, 1902, Private collection

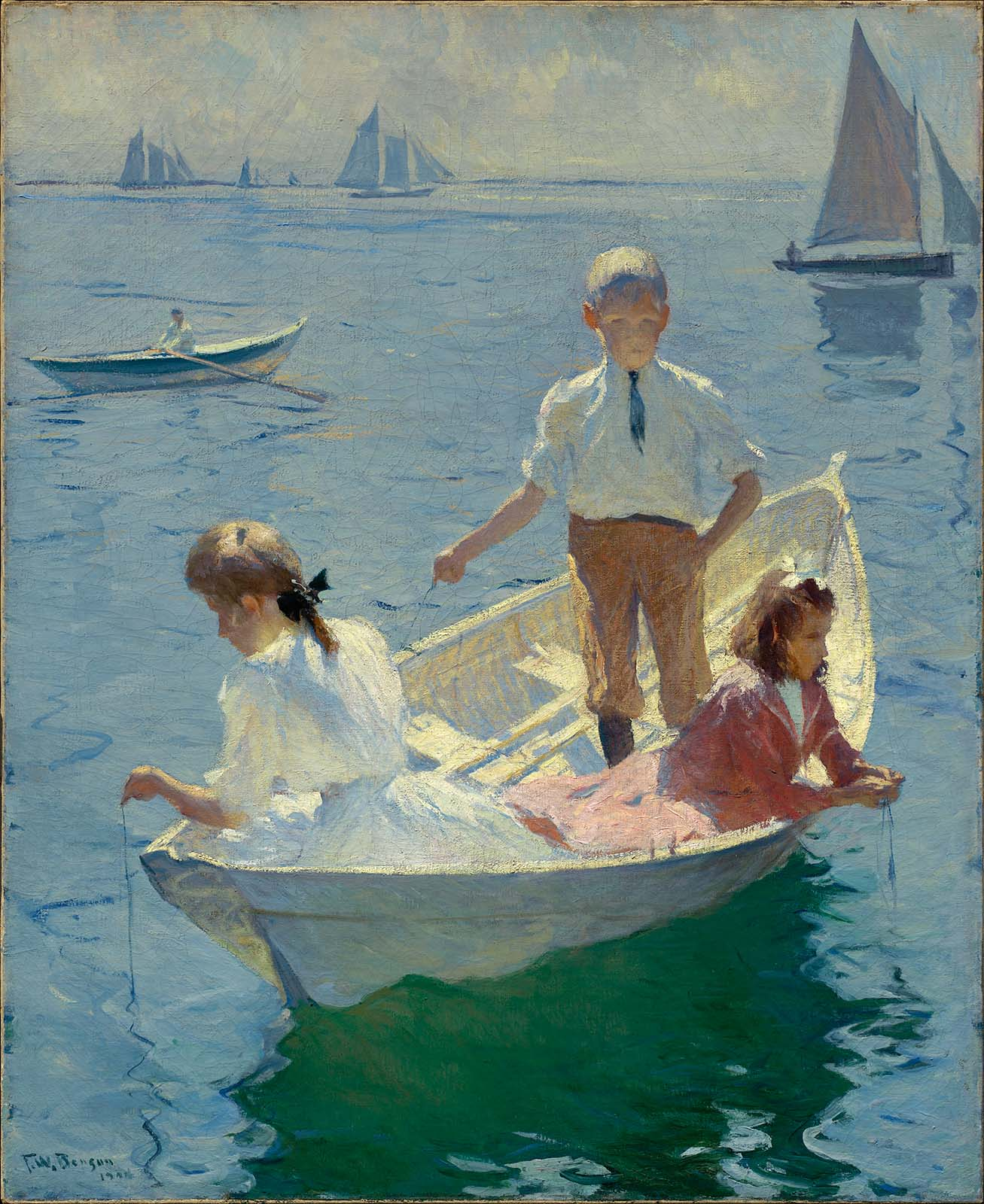
Calm Morning, 1904, Museum of Fine Arts, Boston

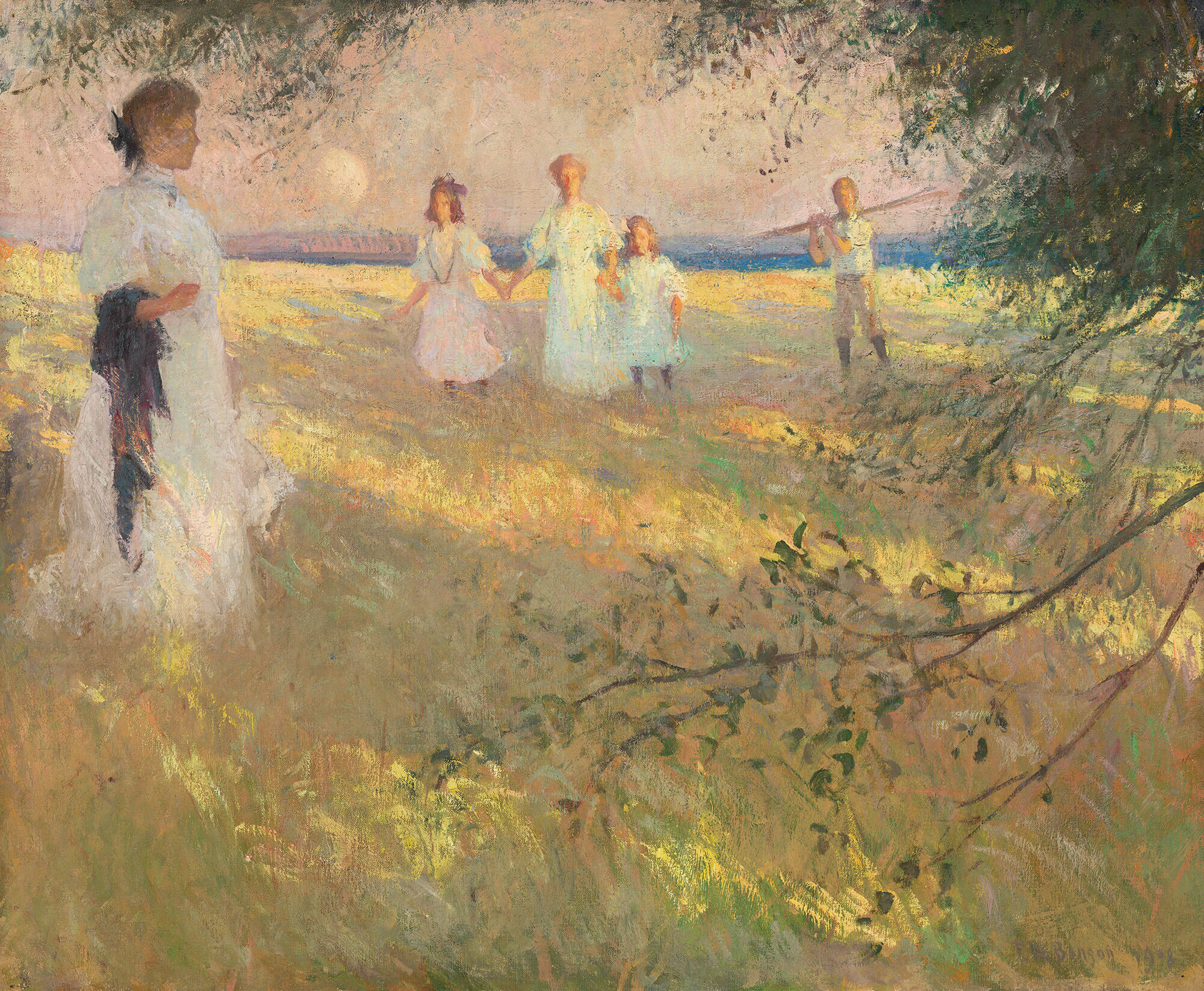
Evening Light, 1908, Cincinnati Art Museum, Ohio

=== Wildlife ===
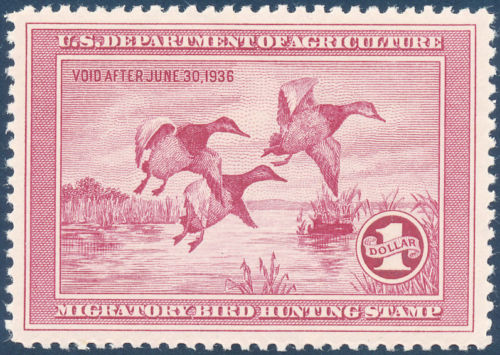
The second U.S. Federal Duck Stamp (1935), based on a painting by Benson

Before Benson began his Impressionist paintings of his family, he made many seascape and landscape paintings. He used several mediums or techniques to capture his love of wildlife, including wash, watercolor, oil, lithography and etching. Regarding his artistic mastery, Peabody Essex Museum curator Dean Lahikainen commented: "Benson was a unique artist, in that he had mastered so many different mediums and subjects. And from his early works right until the very end, light is what he was interested in."

Benson's original goal as an artist to become an ornithological illustrator, and birds were the subjects of most of his washes, etchings, and watercolors. He was a charter member of the Essex County Ornithological Club in Massachusetts, and served as president for the first 18 years of its existence. He designed the club's seal and provided woodcuts to illustrate its annual bulletin. In 1935 he created a painting of canvasback ducks that served as the model for the second Federal Duck Stamp issued by the U.S. Fish and Wildlife Service to support the conservation of migratory waterfowl and their habitats.

Wash paintings

At the Cape Cod hunting cabin that he purchased with his brothers-in-law, Benson began working with black-and-white wash in the 1890s. The works were a commercial success, so much so that Benson was not able to keep up with the demand.

Etching

In 1914, Benson began etching as an interesting pastime, one that along with his eye for aesthetics, required him to master the complex technique for the desired effect. In 1915 he first exhibited etchings of wild fowl, to popular acclaim. Benson turned increasingly to the depiction of landscapes featuring wildlife, an outgrowth of his interest in hunting and fishing. He went on to produce a steady and profitable output of etchings. Once most recognized for his Impressionist paintings, he became equally popular with his etchings. Arthur Philpott, a critic for the Boston Globe, claimed Benson was the "best known and most popular etcher in the world." To one of his daughters he said, "The whole process from the bare plate to the finished print is full of fascinating possibilities and possible failures." Benson, one of the best printmakers of the 20th century, is credited with making wildlife prints a distinct genre. Benson was a member of the Society of American Graphic Artists, known as The Society of American Etchers from 1915 - 1947, based in New York City and participated in many exhibitions.

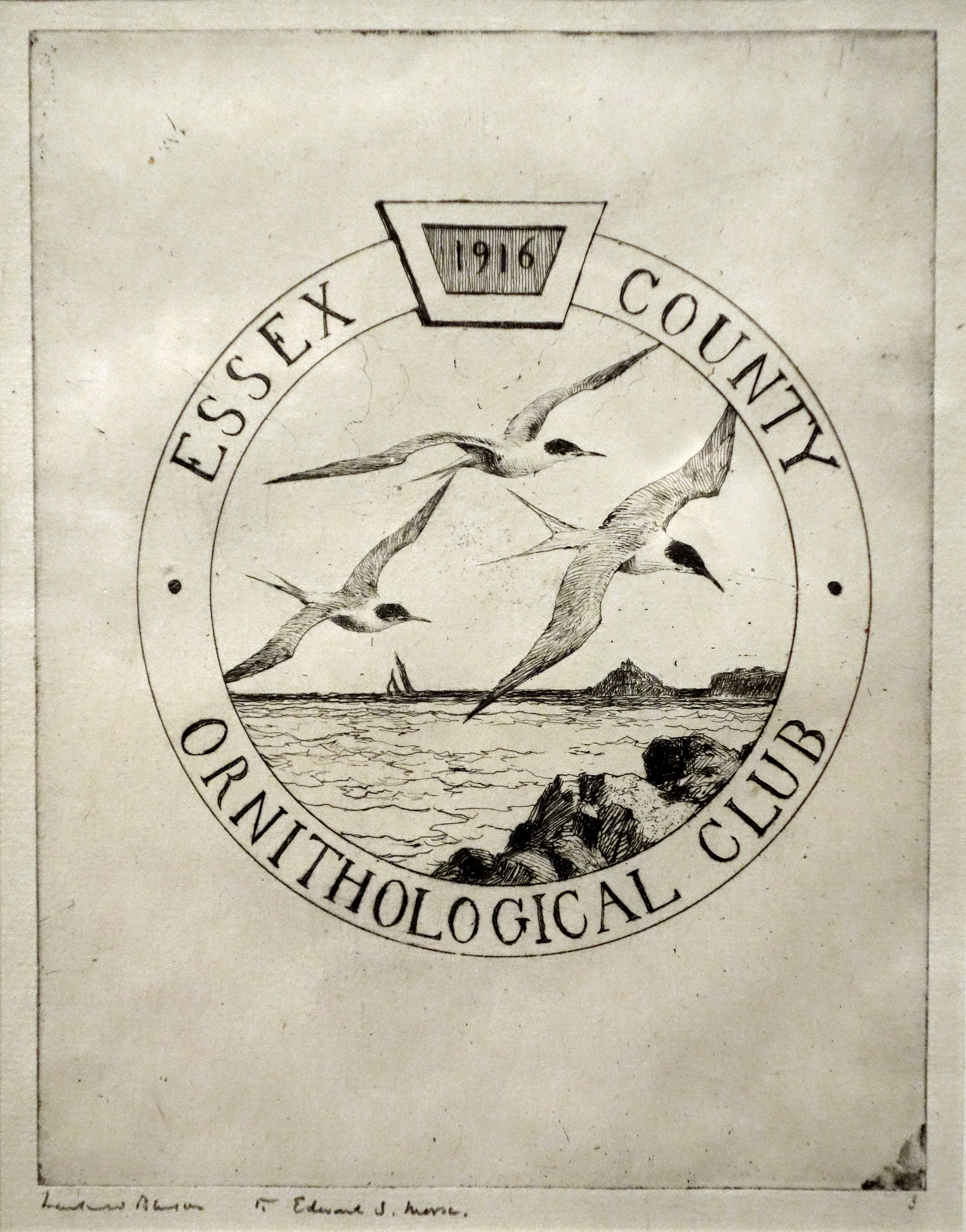
Seal of the Essex County Ornithological Club, 1916, Peabody Essex Museum, Salem

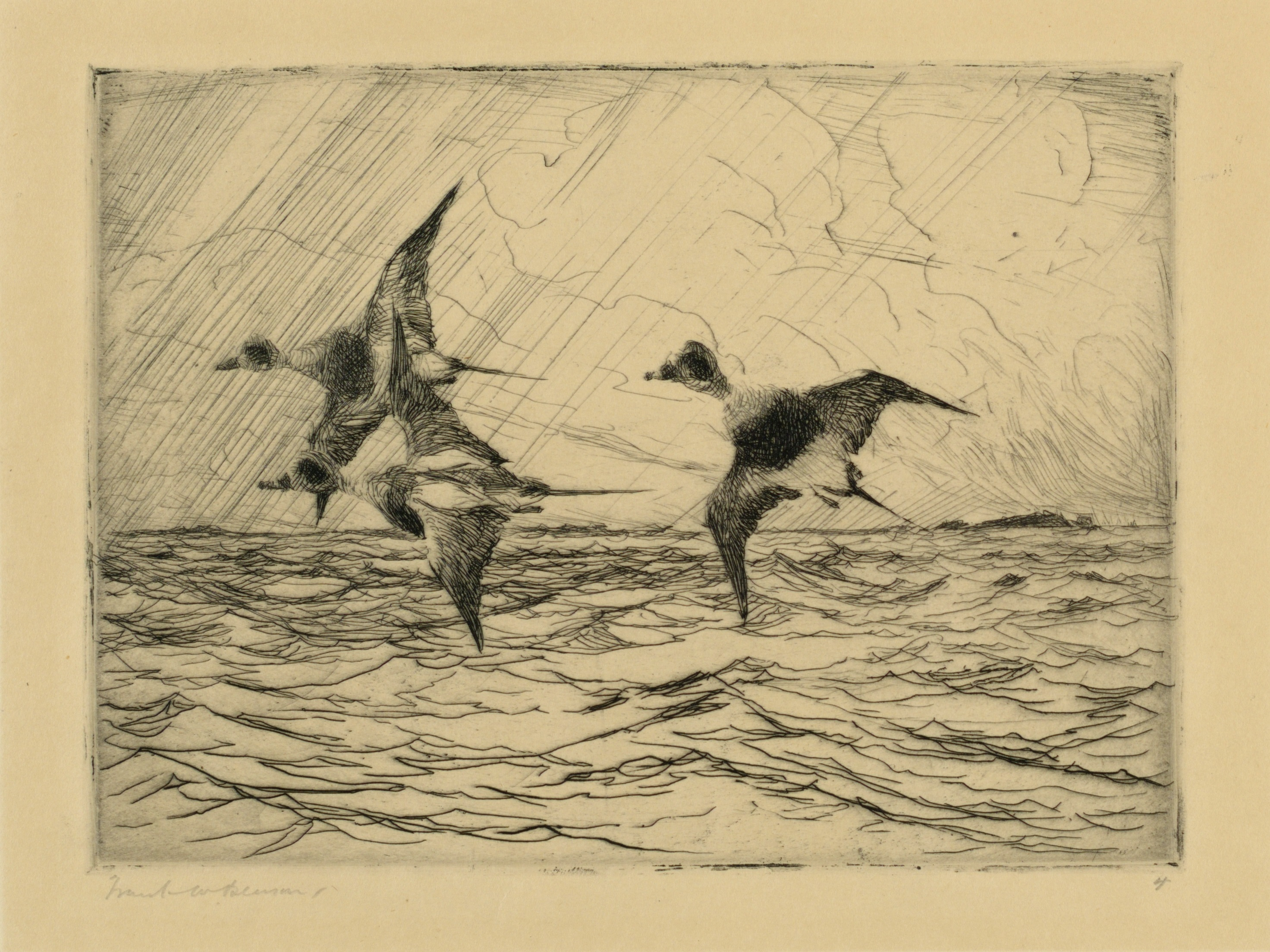
Old Squaws, 1915, Cooper Hewitt, Smithsonian Design Museum

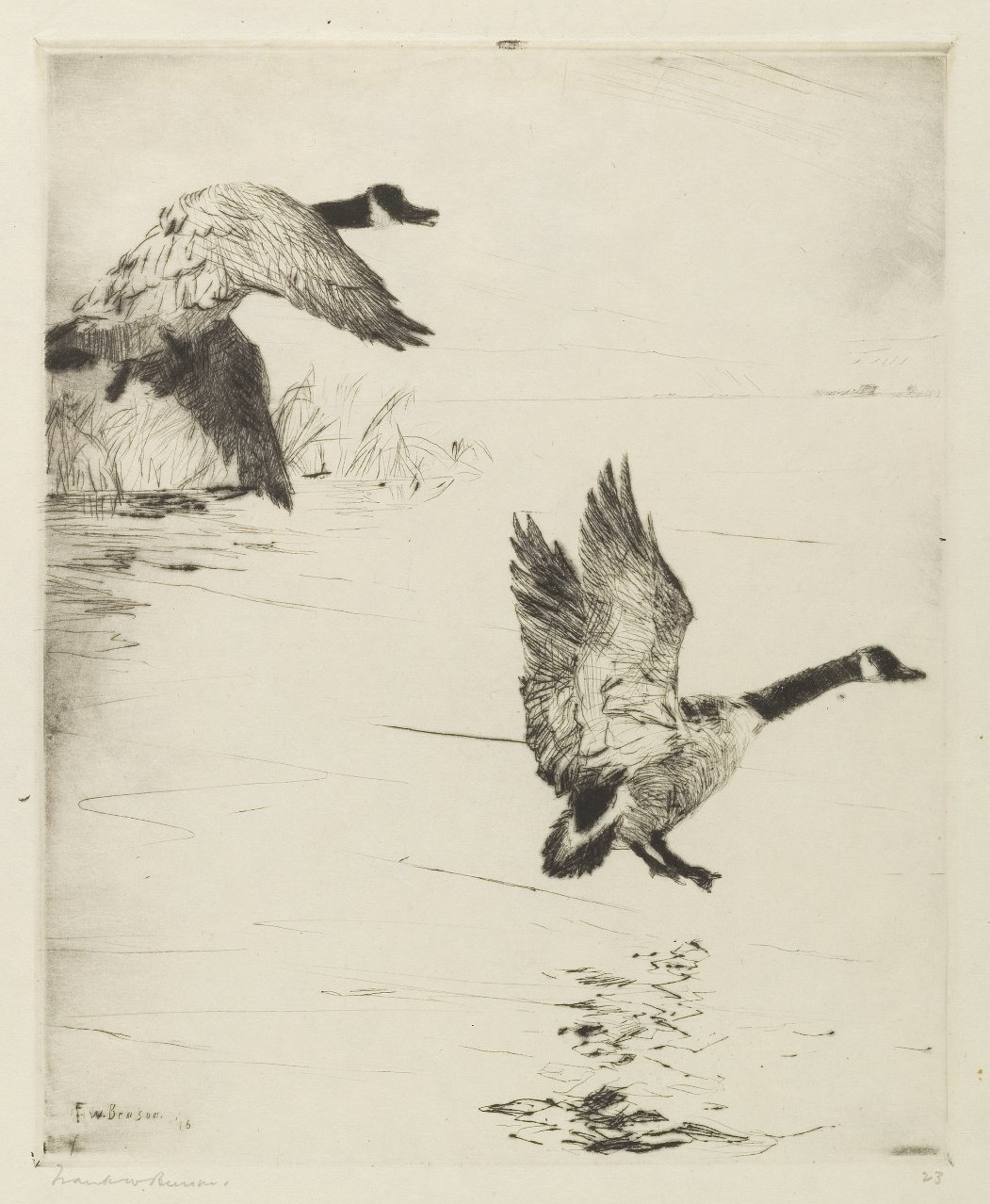
Geese Alighting, ca. 1916, Brooklyn Museum, New York

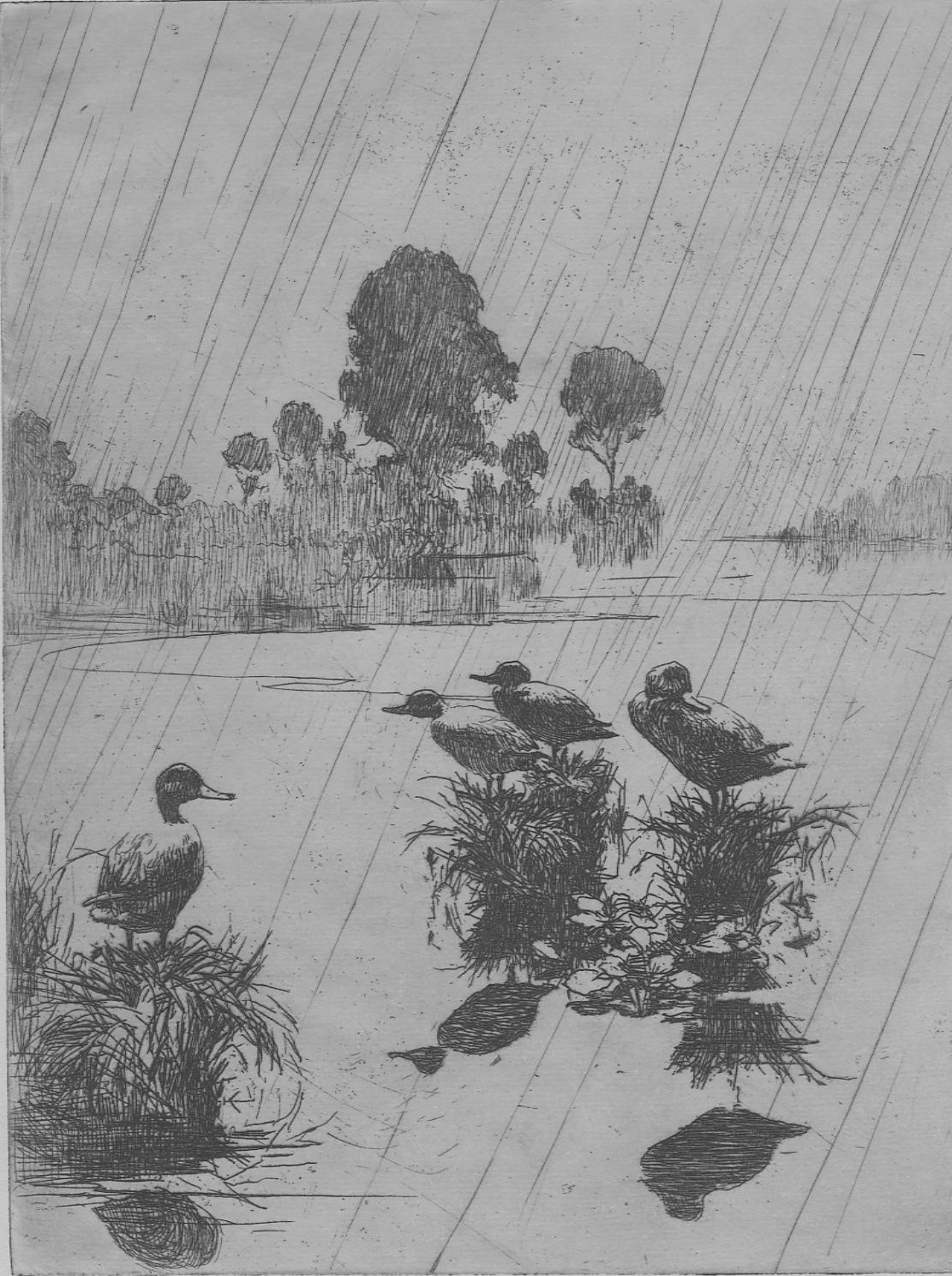
Ducks in the Rain, 1918, University of New Hampshire Museum of Art

Watercolors

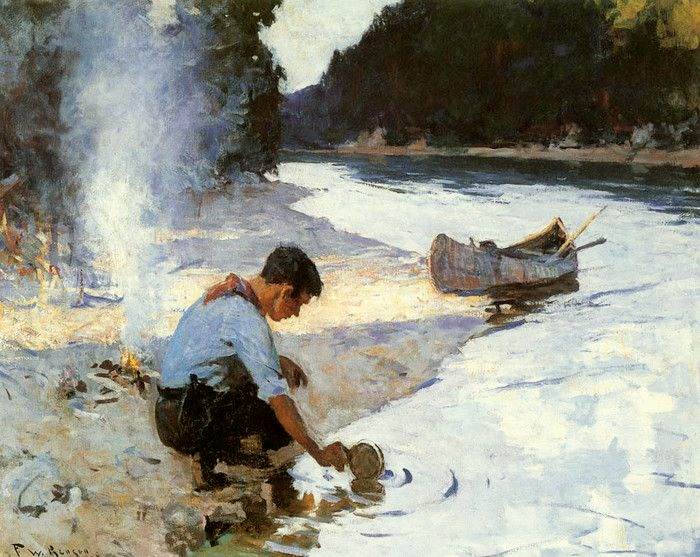
Camp, 1921

Benson's watercolor paintings began on a Canadian fishing trip in 1921. and were often the products of bird-hunting sojourns in Cape Cod and salmon fishing expeditions in Canada. were favorably compared to similar works by . A critic wrote of his watercolors, "The love of the almost primitive wilderness which appears in many of (Winslow) Homer's landscapes and the swift, sure touch with which he suggests rather than describes--these also characterize Benson's work. The solitude of the northern woods is very much like Homer's." Benson made more than 500 watercolors in his lifetime.

Oil paintings

Hunter in a Boat (1915) and Twilight (1930) are a few examples of Benson's oil paintings of wildlife settings.

=== Gallery ===
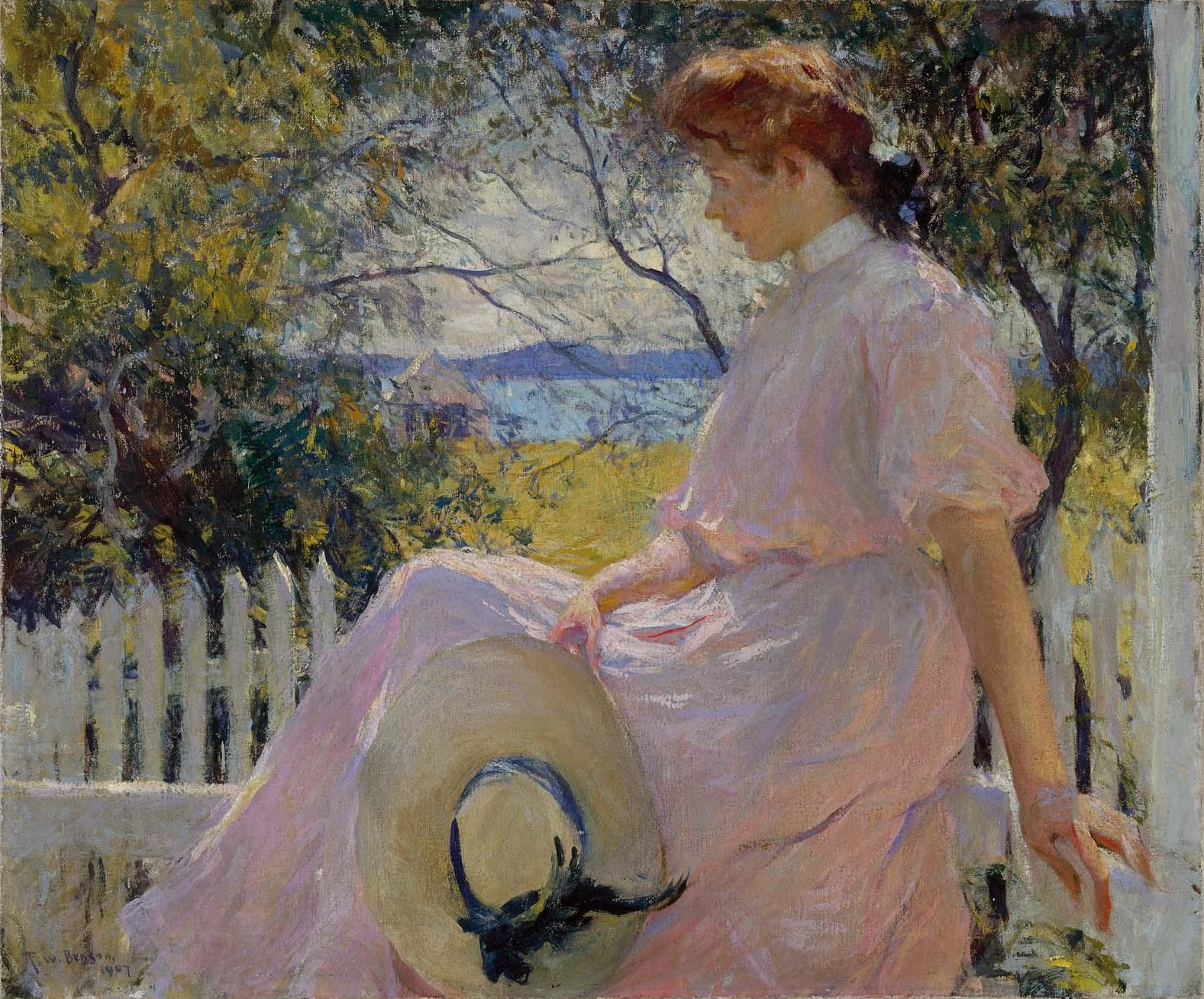
Eleanor, 1907

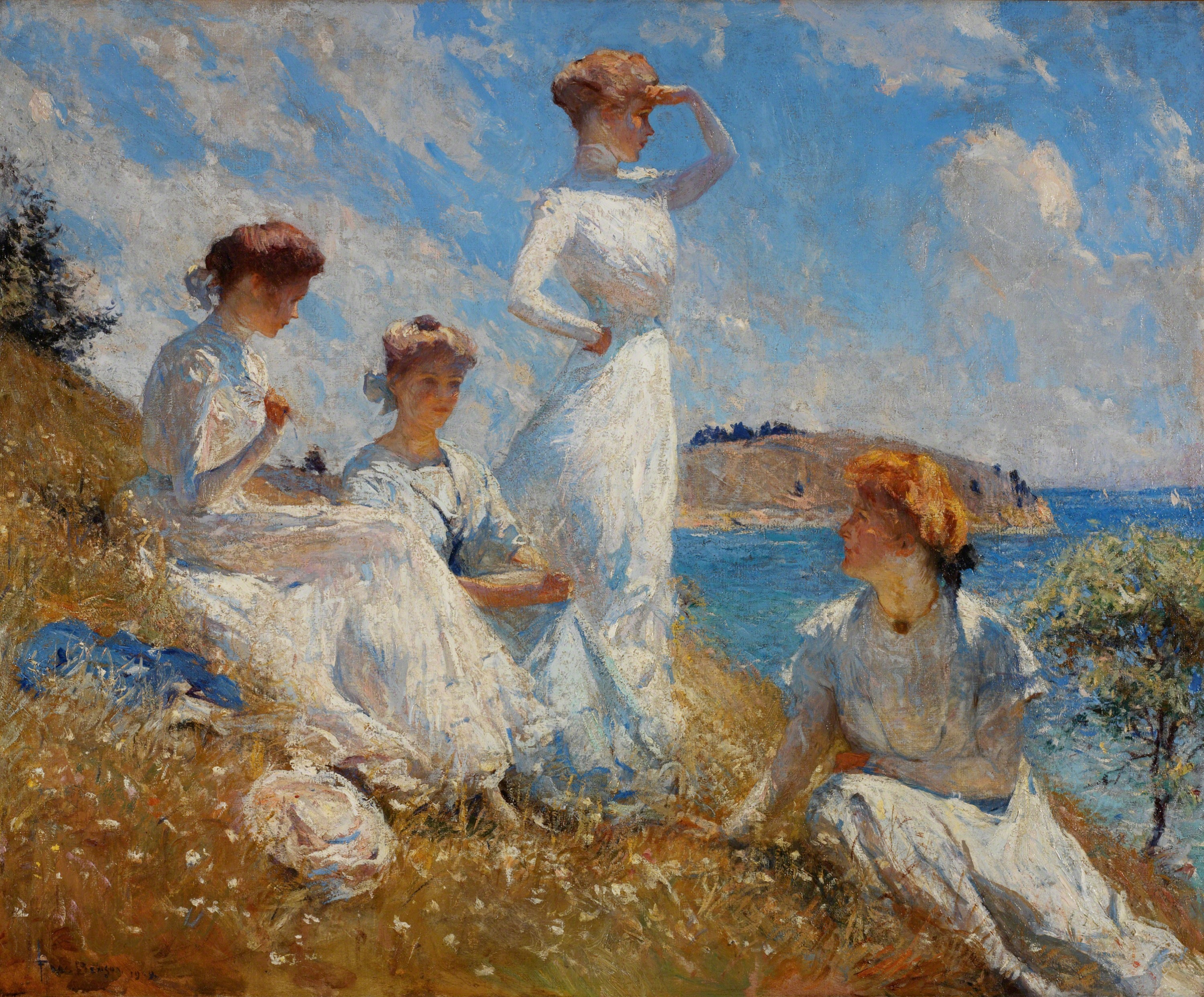
Summer, 1909

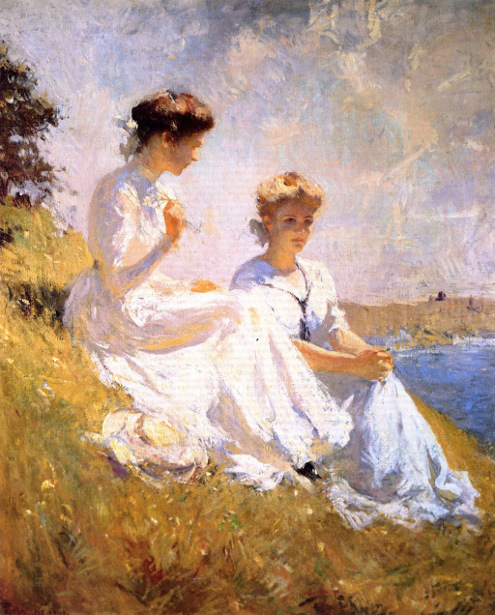
Elizabeth and Anna, c.1909

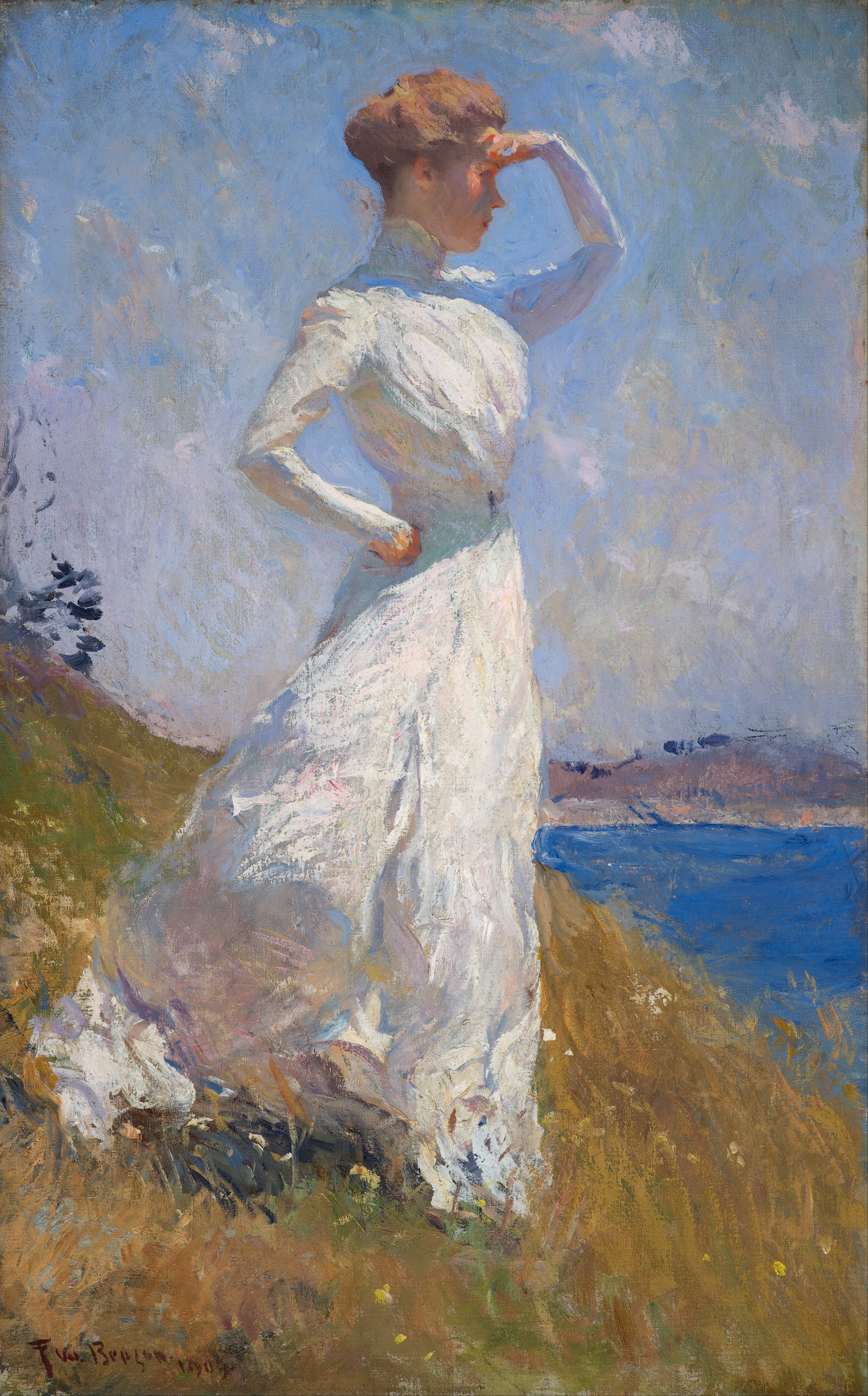
Summer, 1909

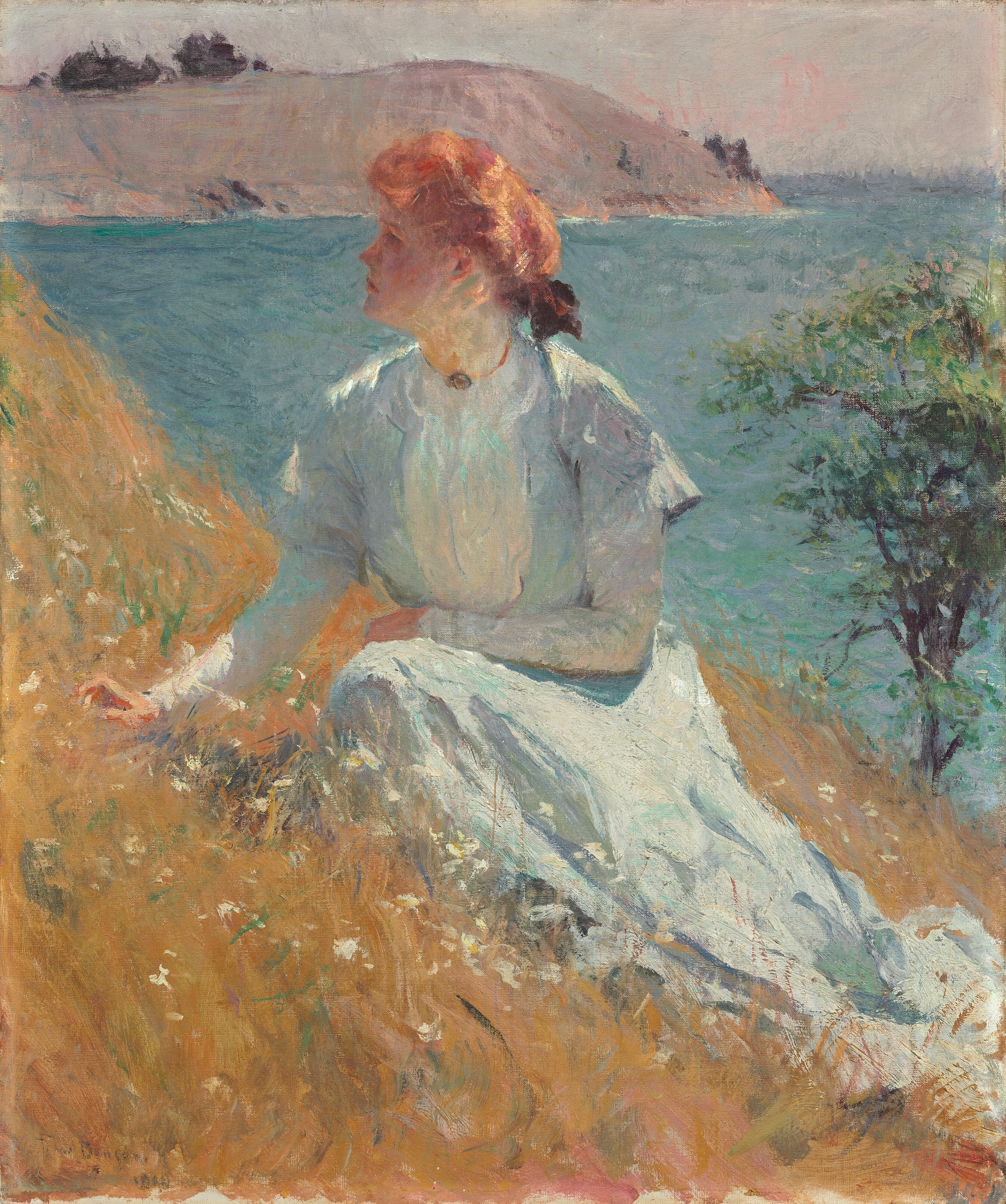
Margaret Gretchen Strong, 1909

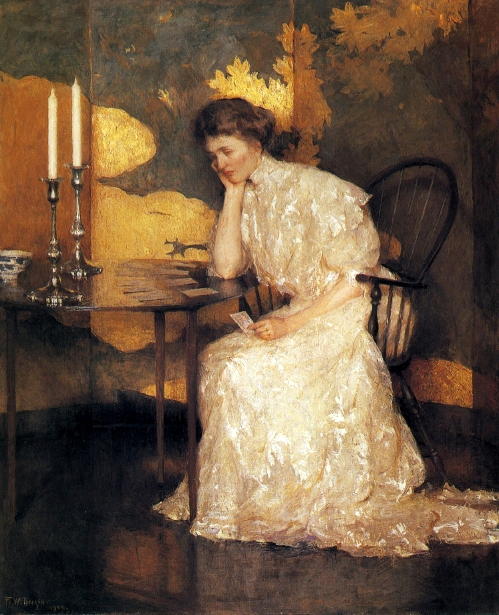
Playing Solitaire oil 1909

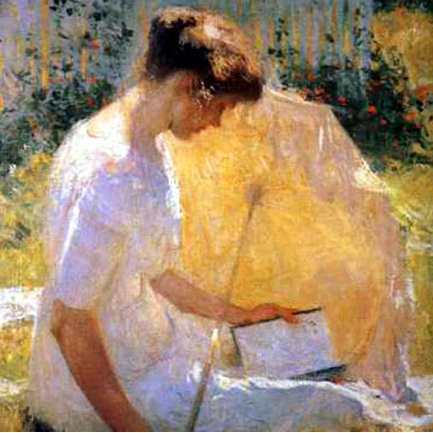
The Reader, ca. 1910

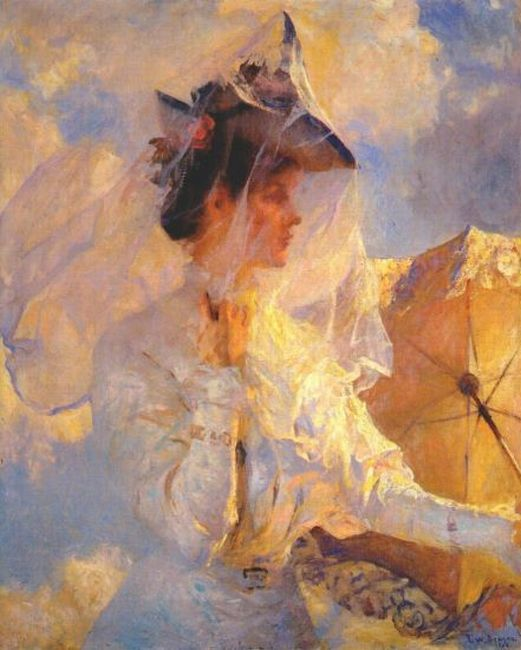
Against the Sky, ca. 1912

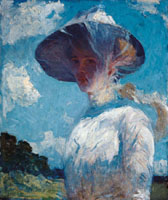
Study for Young Girl with a Veil, 1912

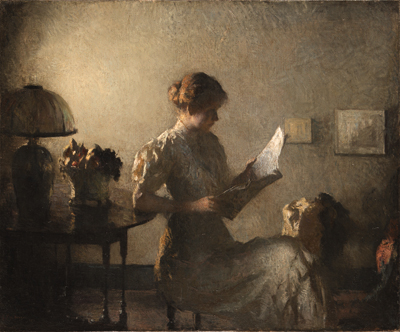
The Grey Room, 1913

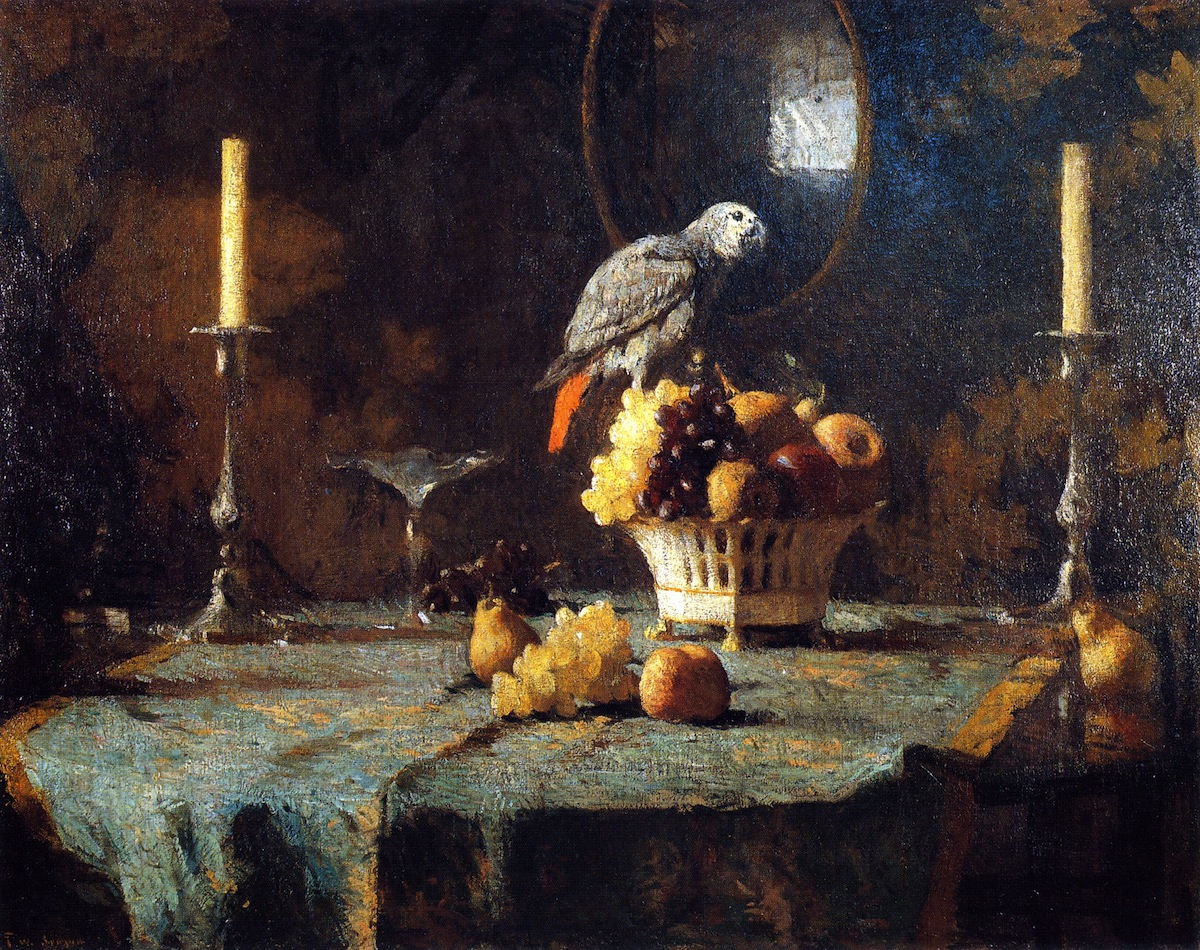
The Dining Room Table, 1919

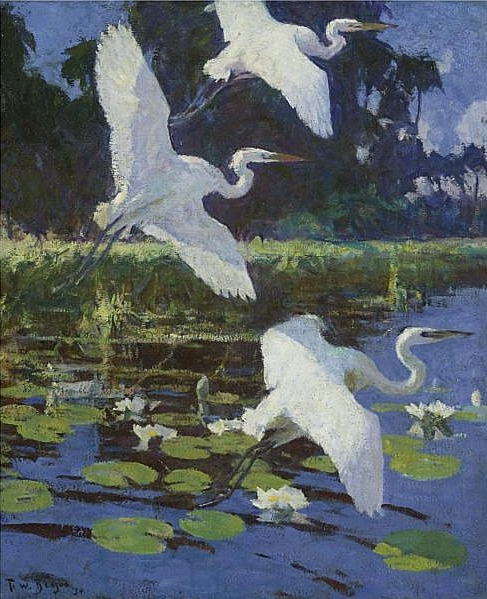
Great White Herons 1923

== Death and posthumous sales ==
He is buried in Salem's Harmony Grove Cemetery.

To date the highest price brought at auction for an oil painting by Benson is $4.1 million, realized at Sotheby's in 1995.

On October 19, 2006, a watercolor painting by Benson was sold at auction for $165,002. The painting was anonymously donated to an Oregon Goodwill Industries site, most likely without the owner's knowing of its value. Bidding on the shopgoodwill.com website started at $10, and increased after the work was authenticated.

== Figure in a Room ==
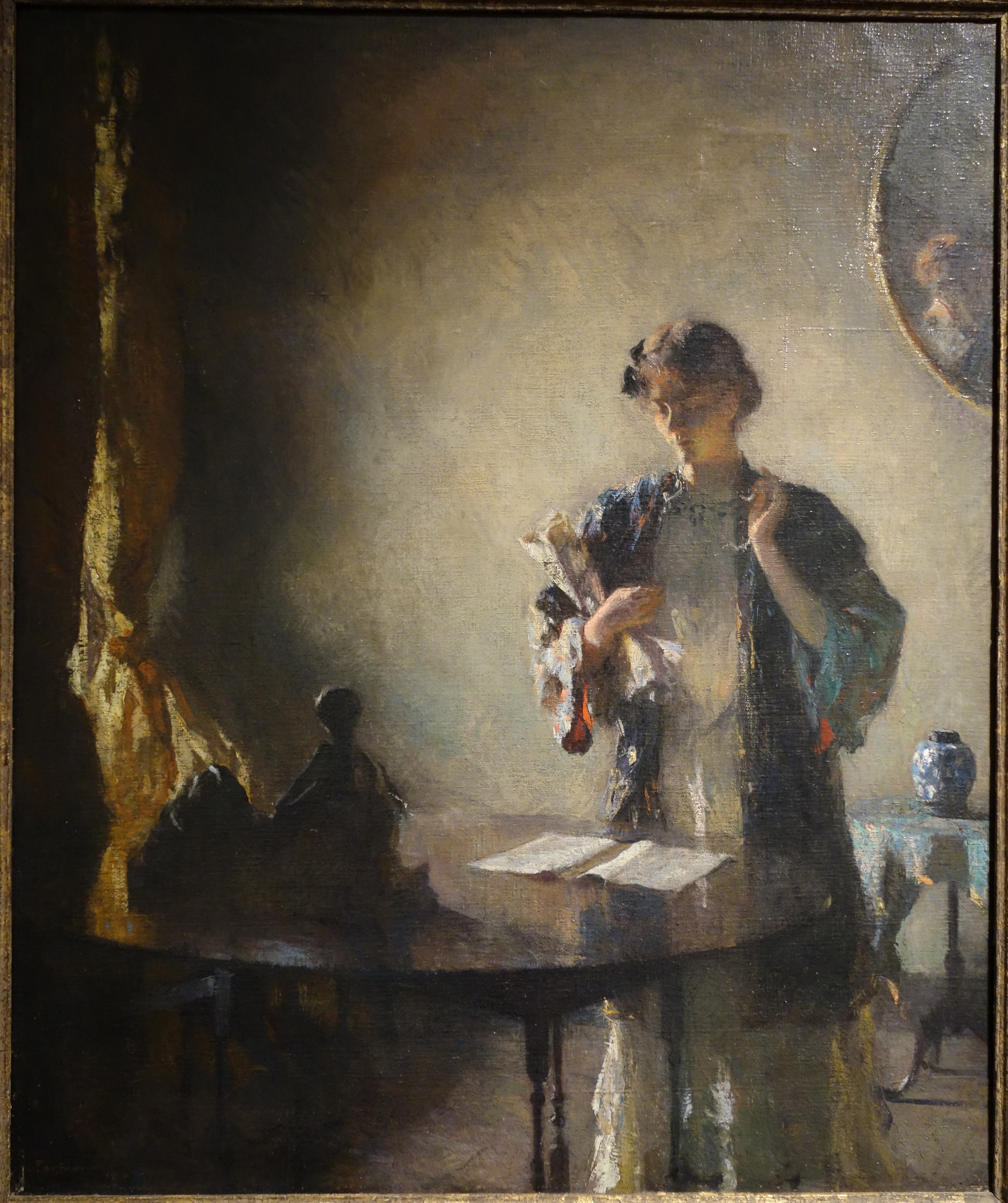
Figure in a Room by Frank Weston Benson, 1912, oil on canvas - New Britain Museum of American Art

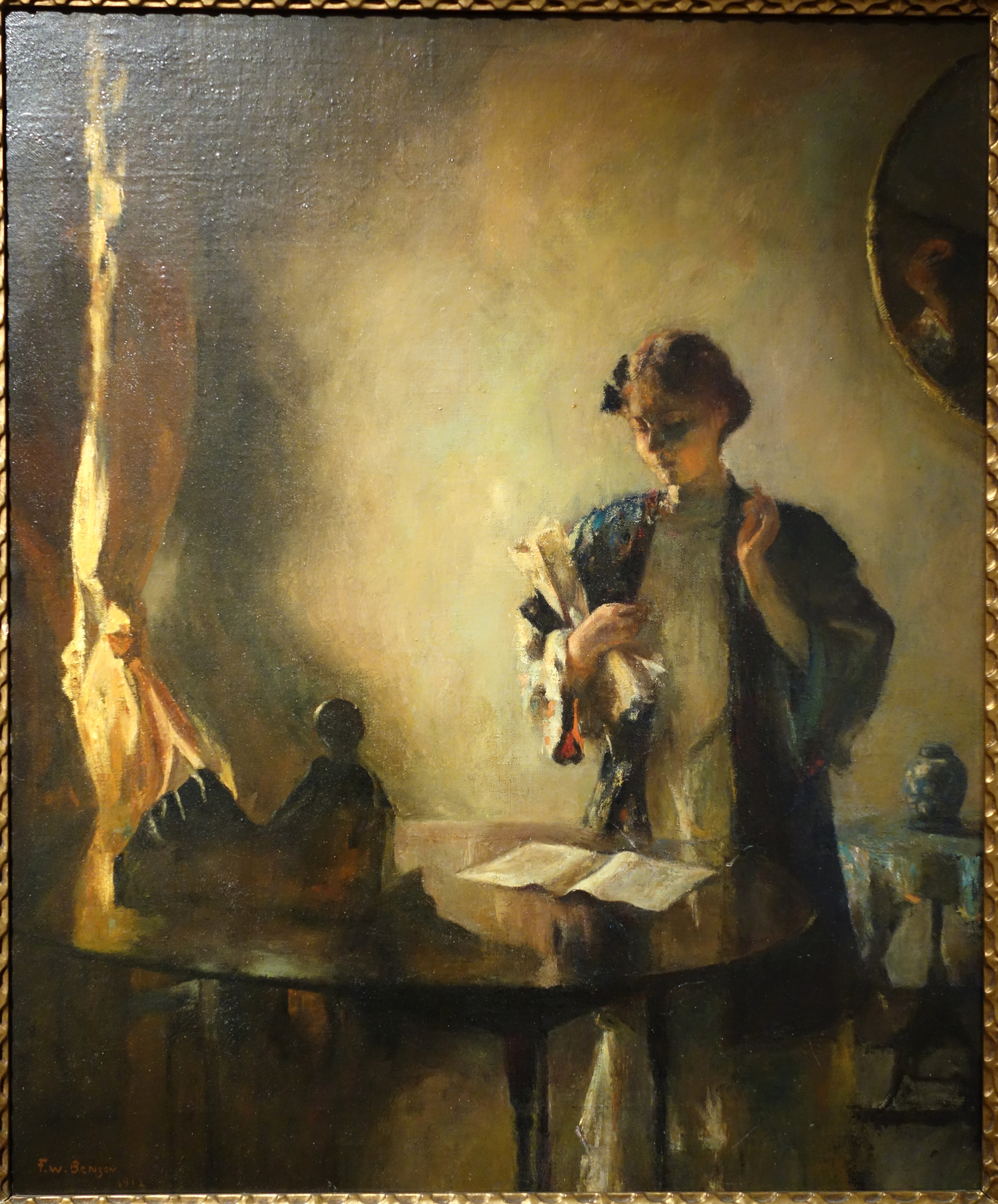
Interior, oil 1912, copy

Benson's Figure in a Room, a 1912 realistic oil painting of a woman standing behind a small table in a room, was involved in a controversy that surfaced long after the death of the artist. The Detroit Club apparently purchased the painting in 1914, following an exhibit held there by Benson. At some time during the next several decades, the painting was replaced on the club's premises by an excellent fake or forgery, which was inserted into the painting's original frame. The original Benson was eventually obtained by a collector named Donald Purdy, and later by the New Britain Museum of American Art. The fake Benson painting remaining with the Detroit Club was finally sold for $38,500 to an attorney and his wife, at an auction held by Christie's in 1986. When the new owners began their own research of the painting many years later, they learned that the New Britain Museum had a strikingly similar painting from Benson in their collection; the couple's subsequent attempt to sell the painting ended when Sotheby's (who also learned of the New Britain painting) pronounced it to be a probable fake. A lawsuit was filed against Christie's, alleging negligence and/or fraud; but a Delaware Court ruled in favor of the defendants, opining that the auctioneer's fiduciary responsibility was with the seller rather than with the purchaser. The court also noted that Christie's six-year warranty of authenticity, clearly communicated, had long since expired. Today, the two "Figure in a Room" paintings involved in this controversy hang side by side at the New Britain (CT) Museum; visitors are invited to decide for themselves which is real and which is fake. Benson scholar, Faith Andrews Bedford, notes that the frame is a hand-carved frame by Wilfred Thulin, one of the members of the famed Boston school of arts and crafts framemakers. She has recently donated to the museum the mandarin coat worn by the model in the painting.

== Exhibitions and shows ==
- 1885 - After the Storm at the Royal Academy in London
- 1889 - National Academy of Design in New York, won first prize for Orpheus
- 1891 - First private show of Benson's work, Chase Gallery, Boston with Edmund C. Tarbell
- 1894 - First known wildfowl exhibition, exhibited Swan Flight
- 1897 - With nine other men, held their own exhibition in New York City
- 1898 - First exhibition as the Ten American Painters in New York City
- 1899 - Second exhibition as the Ten American Painters in New York City, including Children in the Woods, the first Impressionist painting exhibited by Benson
- 1900 - The Sisters was presented at the Paris Exposition Universelle and won a silver medal
- 1904 - First known exhibition of a still life by Benson
- 1912 - First known showing of black and white wash drawings, Ten American Painters show
- 1913 - First one-man show devoted to wash drawings of wildfowl, Copley Society of Art, Boston
- 1915 - Benson's etchings were exhibited for the first time, The Guild of Boston Artists
- 1915 - First one-man show devoted to etchings, George Gage Gallery
- 1915 - First one-man show devoted to etchings in New York, Kennedy Galleries
- 1916 - First one-man show devoted to etchings outside of the United States, British Museum
- 1922 - First exhibition of his watercolors in New York, Boston and Cleveland
- 1945 - His last one-man exhibition of etchings at Arthur Harlow & Sons Gallery, New York
- 1950 - His final exhibition at the Pennsylvania Academy of the Fine Arts

Retroactive exhibitions of his work occurred in 1921 at the Guild of Boston Artists in 1917, Corcoran Gallery of Art, in 1924 at the Carnegie Institute and the Akron Art Museum, in 1936 at Guy E. Mayer Gallery in New York and in 1938 in the Museum of Fine Arts in Boston. Such was its popularity that the exhibition broke the museum's attendance records.

== Awards and acclaim ==
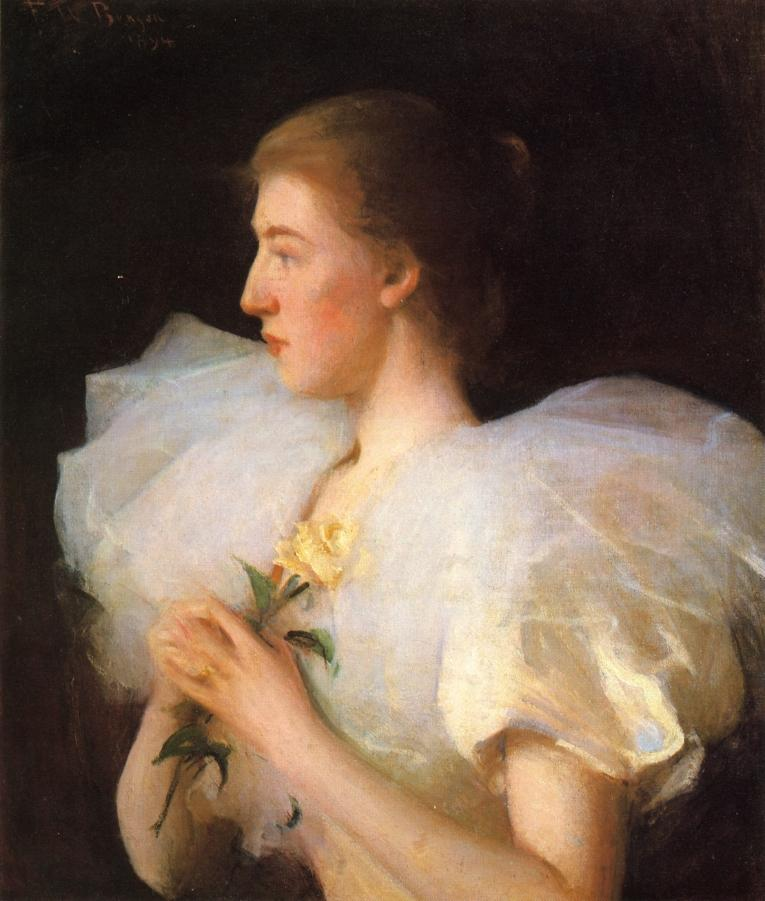
Emily Vanderbilt Binney oil 1894

In the 1890s he began receiving his first awards; after the turn of the century he won awards for his Impressionist paintings, and his wildlife watercolors and etchings won awards in the 1920s and 1930s and up to age 86. In 1914 the Boston Transcript called Benson "America's Most Medalled Painter."

Awards that Benson won include:

- 1889 Third Hallgarten Prize, National Academy in New York for Orpheus
- 1891 Thomas B. Clark Prize, National Academy
- 1896 Shaw Fund Prize, Society of American Artists
- 1900 Silver Medal, Paris Exposition Universelle for The Sisters
- 1903 First Prize, Carnegie Prize, Pittsburgh
- 1906 Thomas R. Proctor Prize, National Academy
- Henry Ward Ranger Fund prize for Still Life, now at the National Museum of American Art
- 1922 Frank G Logan prize for Still Life
- 1924 Frank G Logan prize

He received an honorary Master of Fine Arts degree from Tufts University in 1930 and was selected into the National Institute of Letters and Arts in 1945.

== Organizations ==
- 1888 - Became a member of the Society of American Artists
- 1897 - Elected associate, National Academy of Design, New York
- 1898 - Founding member of the American Academy of Arts and Letters
- 1898 - Resigned from the Society of American Artists
- 1905 - Achieved full membership status, National Academy of Design, New York
- 1914 - With six others, founded The Guild of Boston Artists Having difficulty getting local artist's work exhibited outside of Boston, Benson helped found The Guild of Boston Artists and was the president for 13 years. Modeled on the historic guilds of Europe, the organization held high professional standards in a supportive environment. In their Newbury gallery, annual shows of works of all members were interspersed with two-week one-person shows that highlighted the work of individual artists.
- 1916 - Founding member and first president of the Essex County Ornithological Club, Massachusetts
- 1926 - Elected a Fellow of the American Academy of Arts and Sciences
- 1937 - First documented showing as a member of the Society of American Graphic Artists

== See also ==
- List of works by Frank Weston Benson
