= Elizabeth Ethel Copeland =

American artist (1866–1957)

- Born: 1866; Revere, Massachusetts, United States
- Died: 1957 (aged 90–91); Boston, Massachusetts, United States
- Known for: Silversmith, enameler
- Movement: Arts and Crafts

Elizabeth Ethel Copeland (1866–1957) was an American silversmith and enameler known for her silver-enameled boxes.

Copeland was born in Revere, Massachusetts in 1866. She attended Cowles Art School where she was taught by Amy Maria Sacker and Laurin Hovey Martin. At the turn of the century she came to the attention of Sarah Choate Sears, who sponsored Copeland on a trip to England where she studied enameling with Alexander Fisher (1864–1936).

Copeland had her own workshop on Boylston Street and earned a living as an artist. She was elected to The Society of Arts and Crafts of Boston in 1901. She exhibited at the 1915 Panama–Pacific International Exposition.

Craig died in 1957 in Boston, Massachusetts.

Her work is in the Art Institute of Chicago, the Brooklyn Museum, the Museum of Fine Arts Boston, and the Metropolitan Museum of Art.
