= Woman with Red Hair =

Woman with Red Hair may refer to:

- A Woman with Red Hair (painting), a 1922 artwork by William McGregor Paxton
- Woman with Red Hair (film), a 1979 film Japanese film in the Nikkatsu Roman pornographic film series
