= Helen Messinger Murdoch =

American photographer (1862–1956)

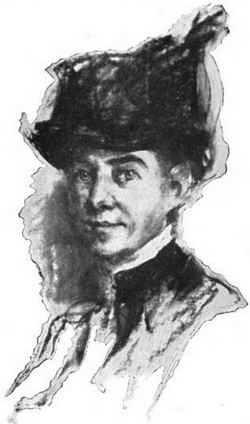
Helen Messinger Murdoch, from a 1919 publication; portrait by Hamilton Achille Wolf.

Helen Messinger Murdoch (September 22, 1862 – March 29, 1956) was an American photographer who pioneered the use of Autochromes in travel photography.

== Biography ==
Born as the youngest of five daughters in Boston, Massachusetts, Murdoch turned to photography in the 1890s after first training as an artist at Cowles Art School. She initially took monochrome portraits but in 1907 she discovered the Autochrome colour process developed by the Lumière brothers.

A frequent visitor to London, Murdoch exhibited at the Wigmore Street, Gallery, the Halcyon Women's Club and the Society of Colour Photographers. In 1911, she joined the Royal Photographic Society becoming a fellow as early as 1912. In 1913, at 51, Murdoch became the first woman photographer to travel around the world, taking both Autochrome plates and black-and-white negatives. Her journey took her to Egypt, Palestine, India, Burma, Hong Kong, China, Japan, the Philippines and Hawaii. She returned to Boston via the west coast in 1915.

Unable to continue her travels during the First World War, Murdoch turned to flying, photographing the Lindberghs, Richard E. Byrd and Amelia Earhart. In 1928, she took the first Autochrome view of Boston from the air.

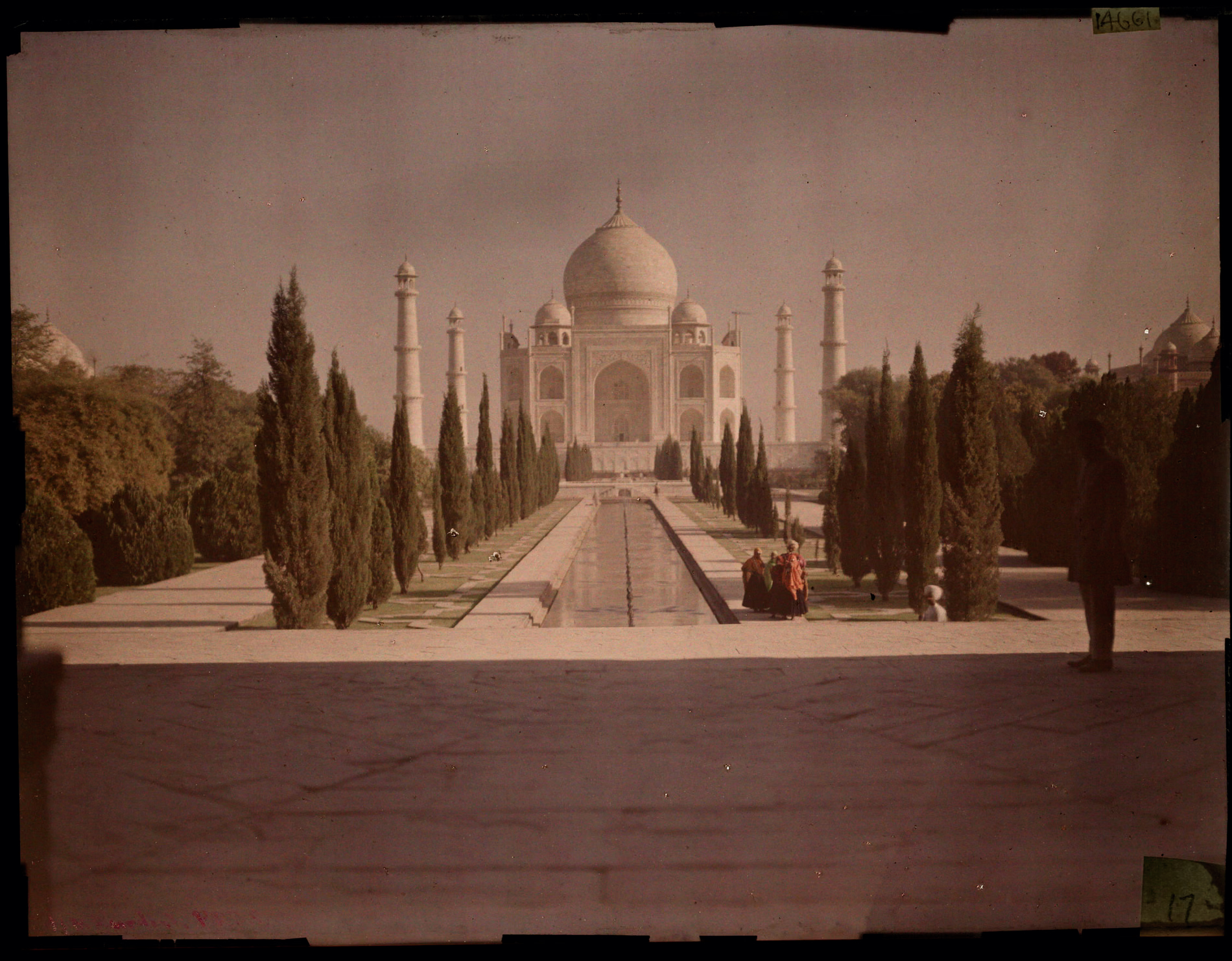
Taj Mahal (1921), autochrome by Helen Messinger Murdoch

Murdoch spent the years from 1929 to 1933 in London, compiling travel albums of her black-and-while photographs. These were difficult times for her. It is said the members of the Royal Photographic Society organised a collection to help her pay for her passage back to Boston. She was also made an Honorary Fellow of the Royal Photographic Society in 1934, relieving her of further fees.

In 1944, Murdoch moved to Santa Monica, California where she died in March 1956.
