= Samuel Burtis Baker =

American painter

- Baker c. 1915.
- Born: September 29, 1882; Boston, MA
- Died: March 10, 1967 (aged 84); Washington, DC
- Education: Massachusetts Normal Art School
- Known for: Oil painting, portrait painting, landscape painting, still life
- Movement: Boston School
- Spouse: Kathleen Cates (second wife)

Samuel Burtis Baker (September 29, 1882 - March 10, 1967), commonly known as Burt Baker, was an American artist and teacher, best known for his portrait paintings.

== Early life and education ==
Baker was born in South Boston, Massachusetts, to Samuel Burtis and Jennie Morgan Brine Baker. He graduated from The English High School in Boston in 1901 as president of his class, and as winner of the Lawrence Prize for Drawing. He studied at the Massachusetts Normal Art School in Boston from 1901 to 1906, under Joseph DeCamp and Ernest Lee Major. After graduating, he continued his studies in Mystic, Connecticut, with Charles Harold Davis, and Belmont, Massachusetts, with Edward H. Barnard, focusing on landscape painting.

== Career ==
=== Painting ===
Baker opened his own studio in Boston in 1910. His early work consisted primarily of portraits of society women, educators and musicians, including a 1910 painting of his former teacher Ernest Lee Major, which was exhibited in Boston, New York, Philadelphia and Chicago, later joining the collection of the Smithsonian American Art Museum. Following a 1910 exhibition of 10 of his portraits at Copley Gallery in Boston, he was commissioned to do portraits for the Harvard University Law School, the Massachusetts and New Hampshire state legislatures, and others. In 1916, he moved into Fenway Studios, where many of Boston's leading artists worked. Best known as a portrait artist, he would expand his range around this time to include figure painting, landscape, cityscape and still life. During World War I, he designed American Red Cross and Liberty Loan posters for the US government.

Interior with Figure Oil on canvas, 50" x 40", 1920 Corcoran Gallery of Art

After moving to Washington, D.C., in 1921, Baker regularly exhibited with the Arts Club of Washington and the Society of Washington Artists. He was elected to the Guild of Boston Artists in 1925. A Boston Globe review of a 1925 solo show at the Guild of Boston Artists Gallery praised the Guild for recognizing Baker as one of the foremost painters in the US.

Interior with Figure (1920) is considered to be Baker's most famous work. In it, a woman in profile holds up a small hand mirror, silhouetted against a curtained window. It won the Corcoran Gallery of Art's William A. Clark Prize in 1921, and was awarded a silver medal at the Corcoran's Biennial Exhibition of 1921. It made its New York debut in the National Academy Museum and School's winter exhibition in 1923. The Corcoran Gallery of Art purchased the painting in 1936.

Baker's portrait of opera singer Lillian Nordica in costume as Brunhilde from Ring of the Nibelung was his longest-running portrait work, begun in 1910 and finally completed in 1948. It was hung at the Metropolitan Opera House in New York City, and later donated to the Lincoln Center for the Performing Arts. Several of Baker's paintings were loaned to The White House for display in Harry S. Truman's private living quarters from May 1945 to October 1946.

=== Teaching ===
Baker taught drawing and design at the Rindge School in Cambridge, Massachusetts, from 1918 to 1921. In 1921, he moved to Washington, D.C., to teach at the School of the Corcoran Gallery of Art, where he taught life drawing, composition and drawing from antiquity. He was vice principal there from 1926 until he retired in 1935. From 1925 to 1936, he was also an adjunct professor at the College of Fine Arts at George Washington University, teaching drawing and painting.

=== Death and legacy ===
Baker died at his home in Washington, D.C., on March 10, 1967. He was successful during his lifetime, but had fallen into obscurity by the time of his death, in part because he was two decades younger than many of the other Boston painters with whom he was linked, and also because his representational style of painting had fallen out of fashion.

Baker had a daughter, Alden Baker, born in 1928, who went on to become an impressionist artist.

In 1993, a quarter-century after his death, the Fuller Craft Museum in Brockton, Massachusetts, held a solo show of 30 Baker paintings, in tandem with the exhibition A Century of Talent: Unknown Artists of the Boston Art Club, which also included a Baker painting.

== Selected exhibitions ==
The Kang-Hsi Vase Oil on canvas, 25" x 30", 1916

- Boston Art Club, Boston, MA, 1908
- Pennsylvania Academy of Fine Art, Philadelphia, PA, various shows, 1908-33
- Copley Gallery, Boston, MA, 1910
- Art Institute of Chicago, Chicago, IL, various shows, 1911–29
- Panama–Pacific International Exposition, San Francisco, CA, 1915
- Doll and Richards Gallery, Boston, MA, 1915-16
- Corcoran Gallery of Art, Washington, D.C., various shows, 1918-39
- Art Association of Newport, Newport, RI, 1920
- City Art Museum, St. Louis, MO, 1920
- Detroit Institute of Arts, Detroit, MI, 1920
- Guild of Boston Artists, various shows, 1922, 1925, 1927, 1948, 1959
- National Academy Museum and School, New York, NY, 1923
- Carnegie Institute, Pittsburgh, PA, 1923
- International Exhibition of Contemporary Art, Venice, Italy, 1924
- Charcoal Club at the Peabody Institute, Baltimore, MD, 1924
- Sesquicentennial International Exposition, Philadelphia, PA, 1926
- Kansas City Art Institute, Kansas City, MO, 1930
- George Washington University Library, Washington, D.C., 1951
- Fuller Craft Museum, Brockton, MA, 1993
