= Ethel Isadore Brown =

American painter

- Born: 1872; Boston, Massachusetts, U.S.
- Died: 1944 (aged 71–72); New Windsor, New York, U.S.
- Education: Cowles Art School
- Occupations: Painter, Schoolteacher

Ethel Isadore Brown (1872–1944) was a painter, illustrator, and schoolteacher from Boston, best known for her 1898 painting Vision de Saint Jean à Patmos.

== Biography ==
Brown was born in Boston in 1872, one of three children of Edward P. Brown, a lawyer, and Emma Isadore (Clapp) Brown. Her older sister, Edith Blake Brown, was also an artist who taught at the Cleveland School of Art. Ethel studied at the Cowles Art School in Boston and with Luc-Olivier Merson in Paris. She painted religious scenes, travel scenes, and portraits. In the late 1890s she exhibited at the National Academy of Design, the Society of American Artists, the Pennsylvania Academy of the Fine Arts, and at the Salon du Champs de Mars in Paris. From 1902 to 1906 she taught drawing, painting, and art history at the Saint Agnes School for Girls in Albany, New York. After her sister died suddenly in 1907, she moved in with her brother-in-law and his two small children and remained there until he died in 1936. She died at her home in New Windsor, New York, in 1944.

Brown, her sister, and Elisabeth Parsons designed a stained glass window that was displayed in the Woman's Building at the 1893 World's Columbian Exposition in Chicago. The feminist-themed piece, Massachusetts Mothering the Coming Woman of Liberty, Progress and Light, was sponsored by the Women's Educational and Industrial Union. As of 2012 it was housed in the Smith Museum of Stained Glass Windows in Chicago. The older woman on the right represents Massachusetts, nurturing and encouraging the liberated young woman of the future.

Brown's best known painting is Vision de Saint Jean à Patmos (1898), depicting the Revelation of St. John the Divine on the Isle of Patmos. It is remarkable for its inventive use of light and shadow. An example of American Symbolist painting, it is included in the collection of the Smithsonian American Art Museum.

Brown was also an accomplished illustrator. Her drawings appeared in The Quarterly Illustrator, and she illustrated an 1893 edition of William Black's A Princess of Thule.

== Image gallery ==
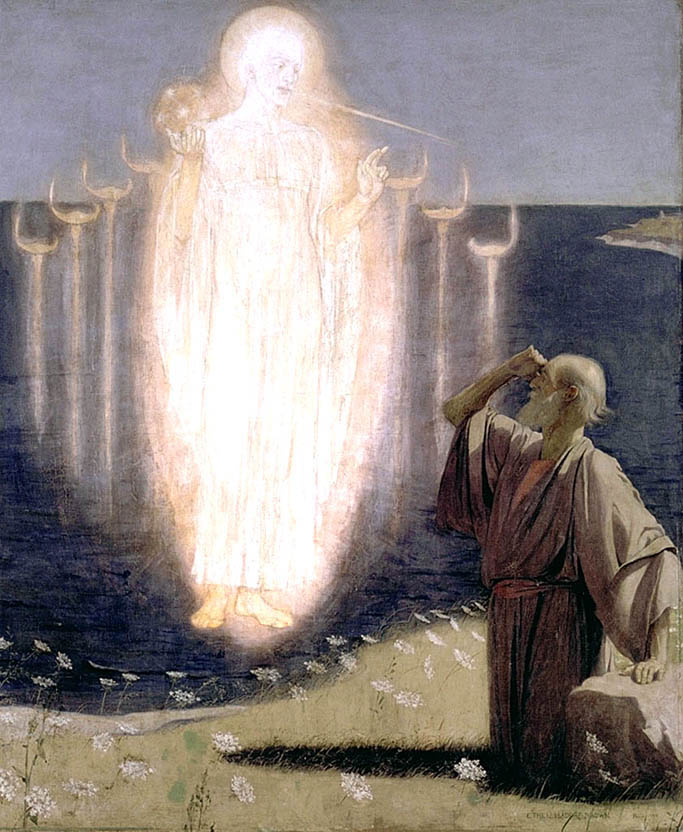
Vision de Saint Jean à Patmos

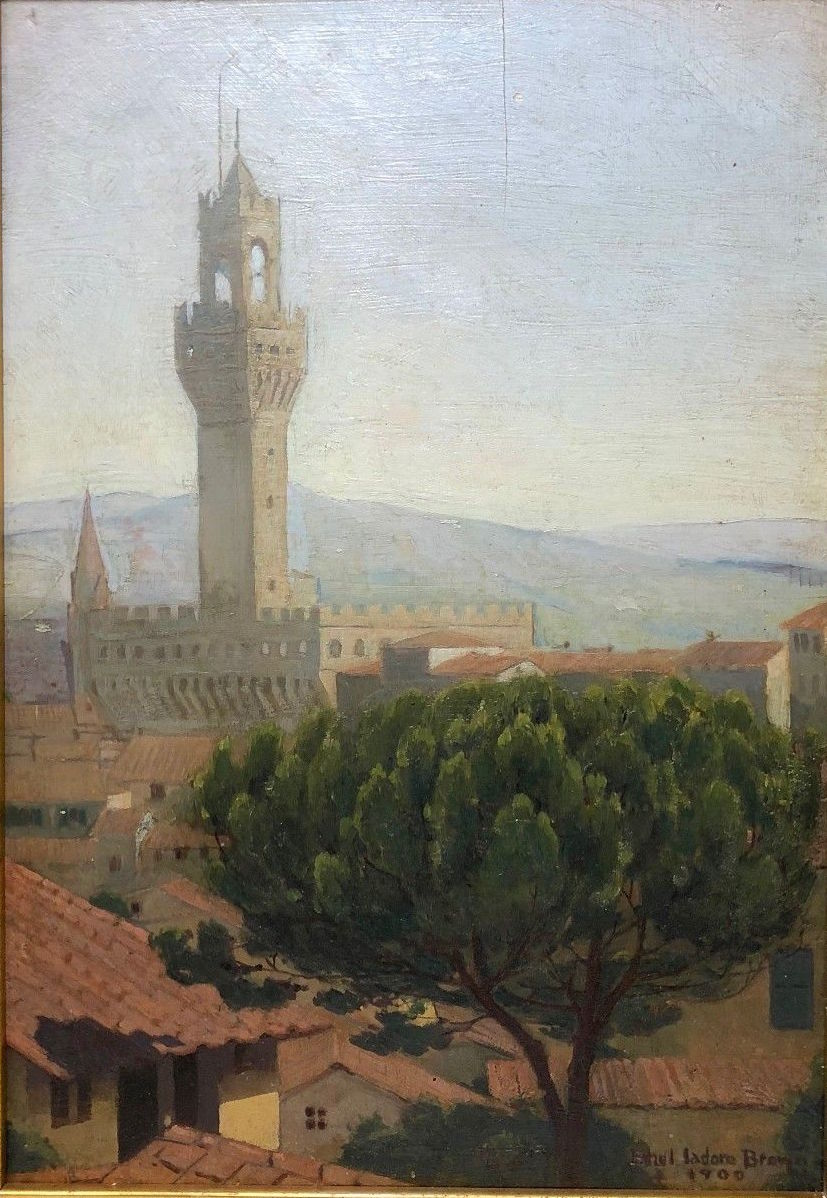
View towards the Palazzo Vecchio in Florence, 1900

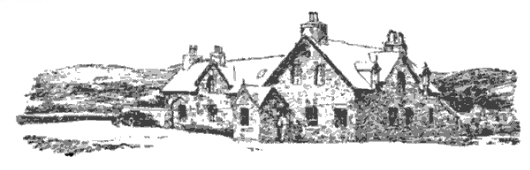
A Princess of Thule, p. 4.

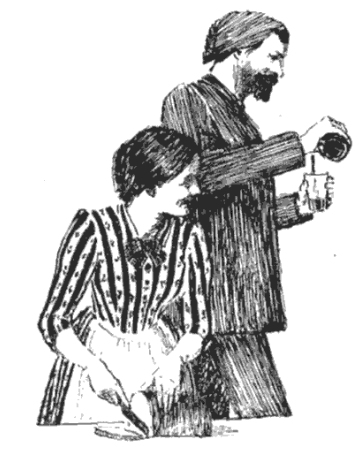
A Princess of Thule, p. 118.
