= A Woman with Red Hair (painting) =

1922 painting by William McGregor Paxton

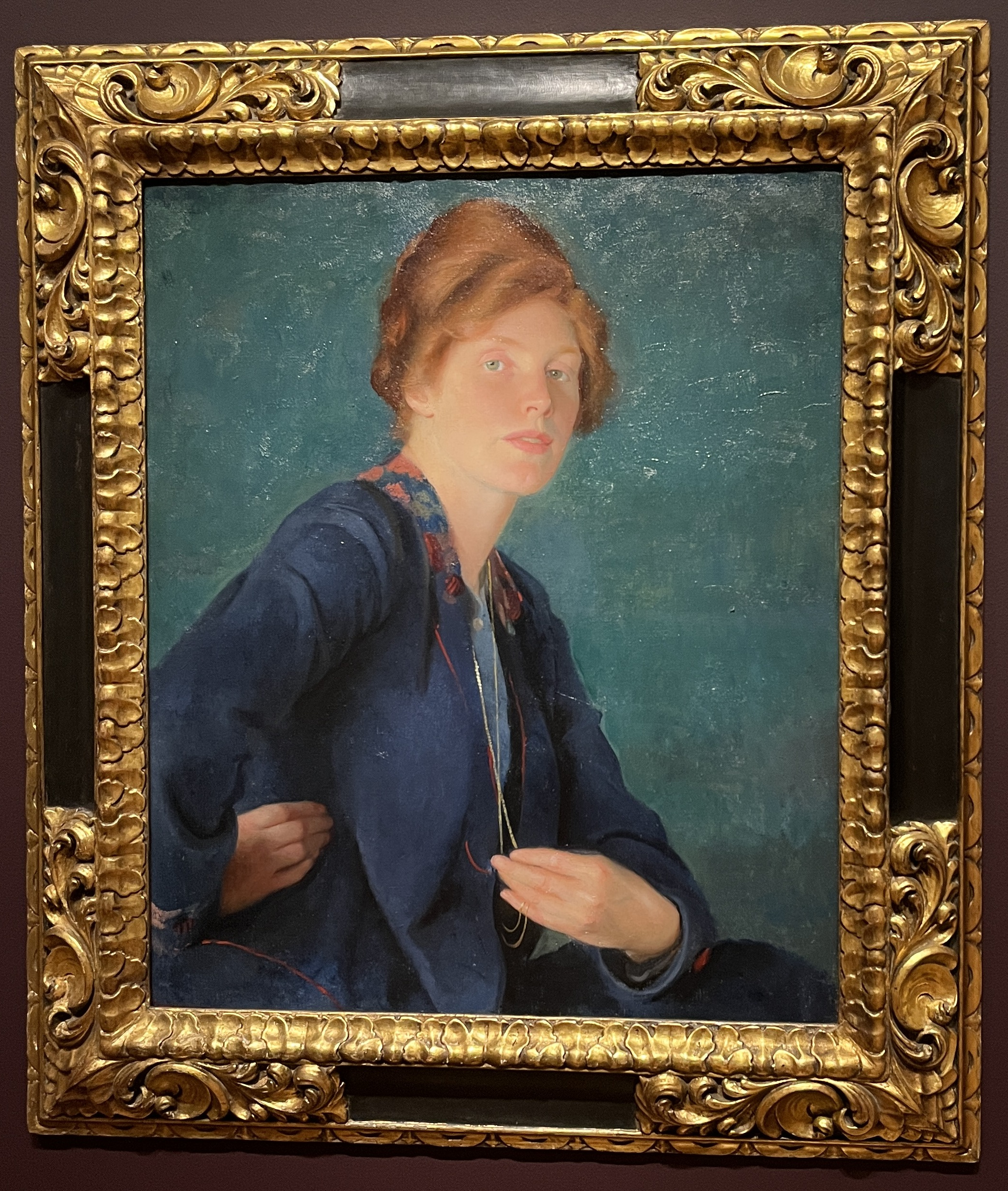
- The painting at the Seattle Art Museum, 2023
- Artist: William McGregor Paxton
- Location: Seattle Art Museum, Seattle, Washington, U.S.

A Woman with Red Hair is a 1922 painting by William McGregor Paxton. The artwork is part of the collection of the Seattle Art Museum.
