= Ernest Lee Major =

American painter

- Portrait of Major by Samuel Burtis Baker
- Education: Corcoran Gallery of Art, Art Students League of New York
- Awards: Panama–Pacific International Exposition silver medal

Ernest Lee Major (1864–1950) was an American painter.

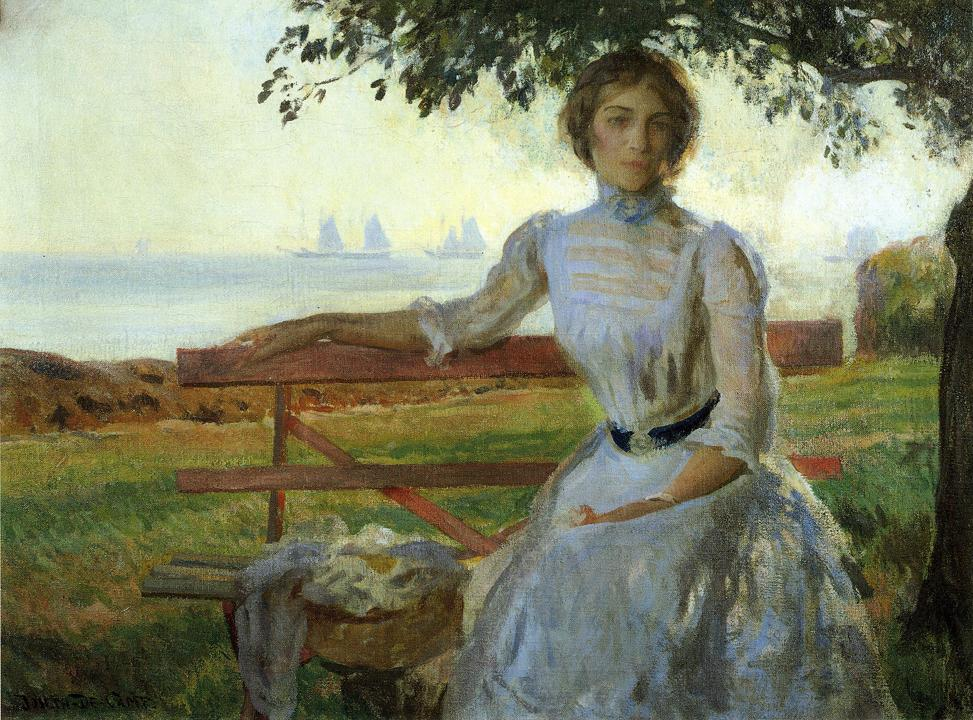
Major's wife, by fellow Boston artist Joseph DeCamp

== Early life and education ==
Originally from the Washington DC area, Major first studied under E. C. Messer at the Corcoran Gallery of Art, then at the Art Students League of New York with William Merritt Chase. A Harper Hargarten Prize provided him with the opportunity to travel to Europe, where he studied under Gustave Boulanger and Jules Joseph Lefebvre.

== Career ==
Returning to the United States in 1888, Major taught at Cowles Art School until he took a teaching post in 1896 at Massachusetts Normal Art School. From 1908, he moved to Fenway Studios, where he taught private lessons and painted.

Major's work won a silver medal at the Panama–Pacific International Exposition in 1915, and also the Bok Prize in 1917.

Upon Major's death, the Vose Galleries displayed his works in a memorial exhibit.
