= Cowles Art School =

Former art school in Boston, Massachusetts

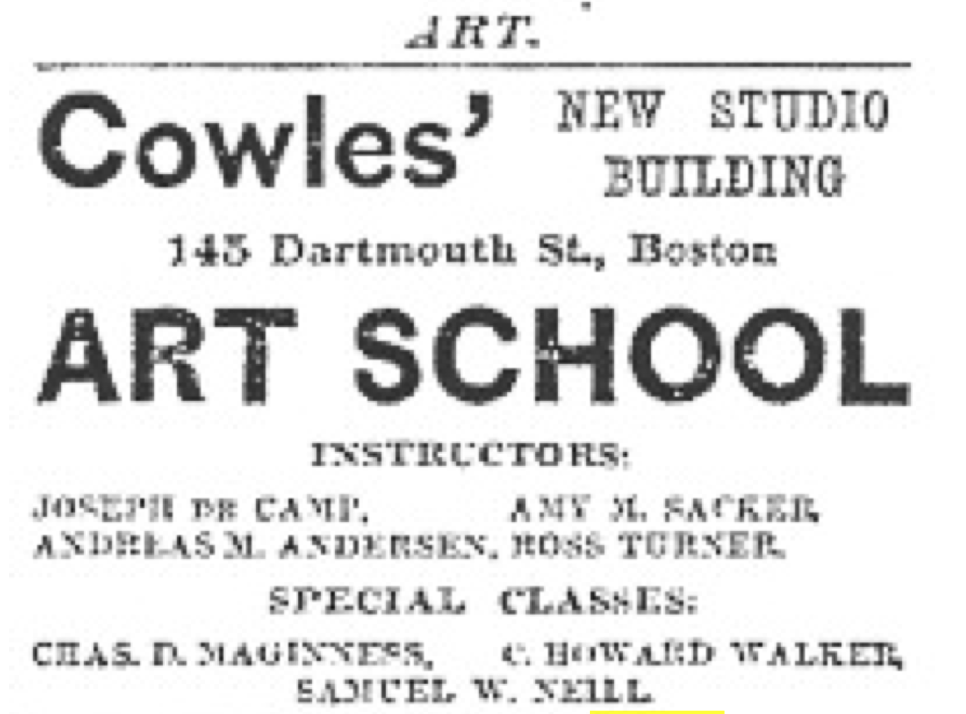
- Boston Evening Transcript, 1896.
- Type: Art school
- Active: 1883–1900
- Founder: Frank Cowles
- Location: Boston, Massachusetts, United States

Cowles Art School (Cowles School of Art) was established in 1883, in a studio building located at 145 Dartmouth Street in Boston, Massachusetts. It was one of the largest art schools in the city and boasted an enrollment of several hundred until it was closed in 1900.

== History ==
By the end of the 19th-century, Boston had become an important art center with number of highly respected artists teaching in the city. A rich artistic environment was promoted, at least in part, by the Massachusetts Drawing Act of 1870. The first of its kind in the nation, the legislation added drawing to a list of school subjects that were required to be taught in all Massachusetts public schools: reading, writing, grammar, orthography, geography, arithmetic, United States history, and good behavior. The Drawing Act of 1870 also required towns with populations exceeding 10,000 to make industrial and mechanical drawing instruction available to any interested residents over the age of 15.

This new legislation caused a spike in the need for qualified artists in Massachusetts. To fill this sudden need for art teachers, Massachusetts Normal Art School (MNA) was established in 1873, and the Cowles Art School was founded ten years later in 1883. Located two blocks behind the Museum of Fine Arts, in the New Studio Building near the Back Bay Station, the school was established by Frank Cowles. He modeled the curriculum off of the Parisian art academies of his time, and borrowed the school's price structure from that of the nearby Art Students League of New York.

Throughout its existence, the art school was well known for its instructors. Frank Cowles placed a heavy emphasis on hiring artists that were also well-versed in mechanical drawing and lecturing, resulting in a faculty of confident artists ready to impart their knowledge to both advanced professionals and brand-new beginner artists. The Cowles Art School merged with the New England Conservatory in 1900, but fine arts instruction there ended only two years later in 1902.

== Courses ==
The Cowles Art School offered instruction in both men's and women's figure drawing and painting from the flat cast and life, artistic anatomy, perspective, composition, oil painting, watercolors, and both painting and drawing courses in still life and portraiture. Unlike many other art schools of the time, Cowles also offered courses in things like art history, the French language, and literature. According to an article published in 1886 that advocated for more art schools to copy Cowles' educational model, the school had organized itself into six distinct departments: watercolor painting, flowers and still-life, portraiture drawing, drawing from cast, evening classes, and life drawing for men and women.

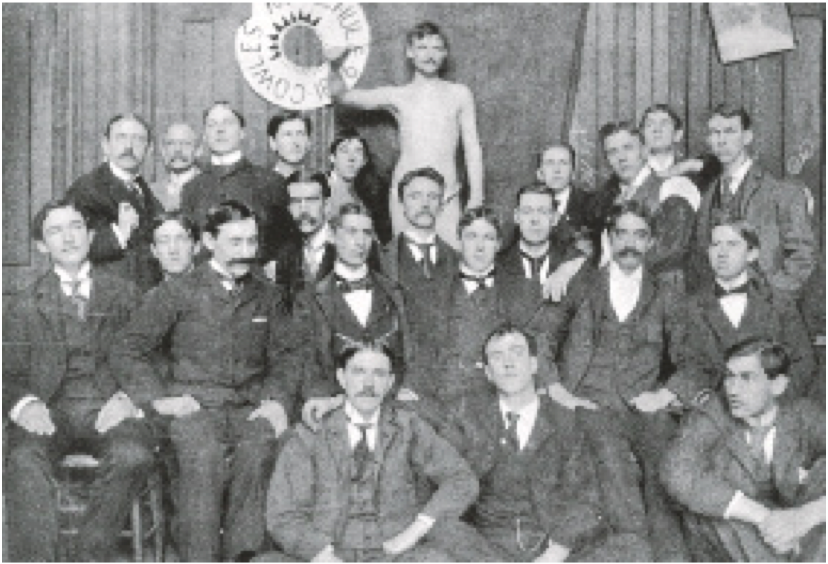
Life drawing class at Cowles Art School, ca. 1897.

"In addition to giving a continuous and thorough training in art, the school meets in a whole, some way, the students who are not able to attend for long periods at a time, or who have been obliged to gain their instruction in an irregular and unwell way, and need to have their deficiencies made up in special lines of study...each student intent on joining is allowed to enter at once upon the highest grade of work for which he or she is capable of, and is carefully advised and guided in subsequent work."

— Frank Robinson, The Art Interchange, Vol. 33 No. 1 (January, 1895)

The school's certification process encouraged students to take breaks and study abroad in Europe, with students finding they had a good reputation among schools in Paris. They also welcomed nontraditional students, offering morning, afternoon, and evening classes, summer programs, and Saturday morning lessons. Many exhibition opportunities were open to all students, who regularly won scholarships and awards for their efforts.

== Notable instructors ==
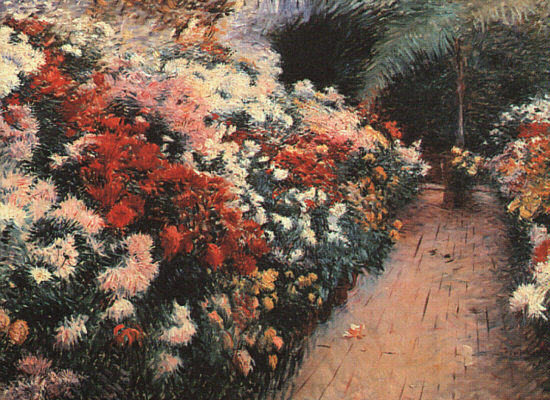
Chrysanthemums, oil on canvas, Dennis Miller Bunker, 1888.

- Dennis Miller Bunker, chief instructor of painting (1885–1889)
- Joseph DeCamp, chief instructor of painting, life drawing (1890–1899)
- Abbott Fuller Graves still life and flowers instructor (1885–1887)
- Childe Hassam (1884–1886)
- Ernest Lee Major life drawing instructor (1888–1896)
- Amy Maria Sacker (1894–1900)
- Robert Vonnoh (1884–1885)

== Notable students ==
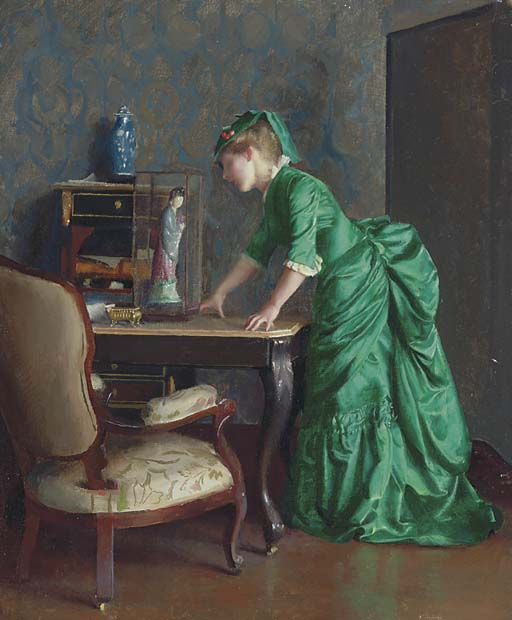
The Green Dress, oil on canvas, William McGregor Paxton, 1914.

- Elizabeth Gowdy Baker
- Ethel Isadore Brown
- George Elmer Browne
- Elizabeth Ethel Copeland
- William Cotton
- Angel De Cora (1898)
- W. Herbert Dunton
- Henry Brown Fuller
- Lucia Fairchild Fuller
- Julia Collier Harris
- William Jurian Kaula (1891–1896)
- Jo Mora
- Helen Messinger Murdoch
- Elizabeth Okie Paxton (1893)
- William McGregor Paxton (1893)
- Lila Cabot Perry (1886–1887)
- Ethel Reed (1893)
- Sarah Choate Sears
- John A. Wilson
