= George Elmer Browne =

American painter

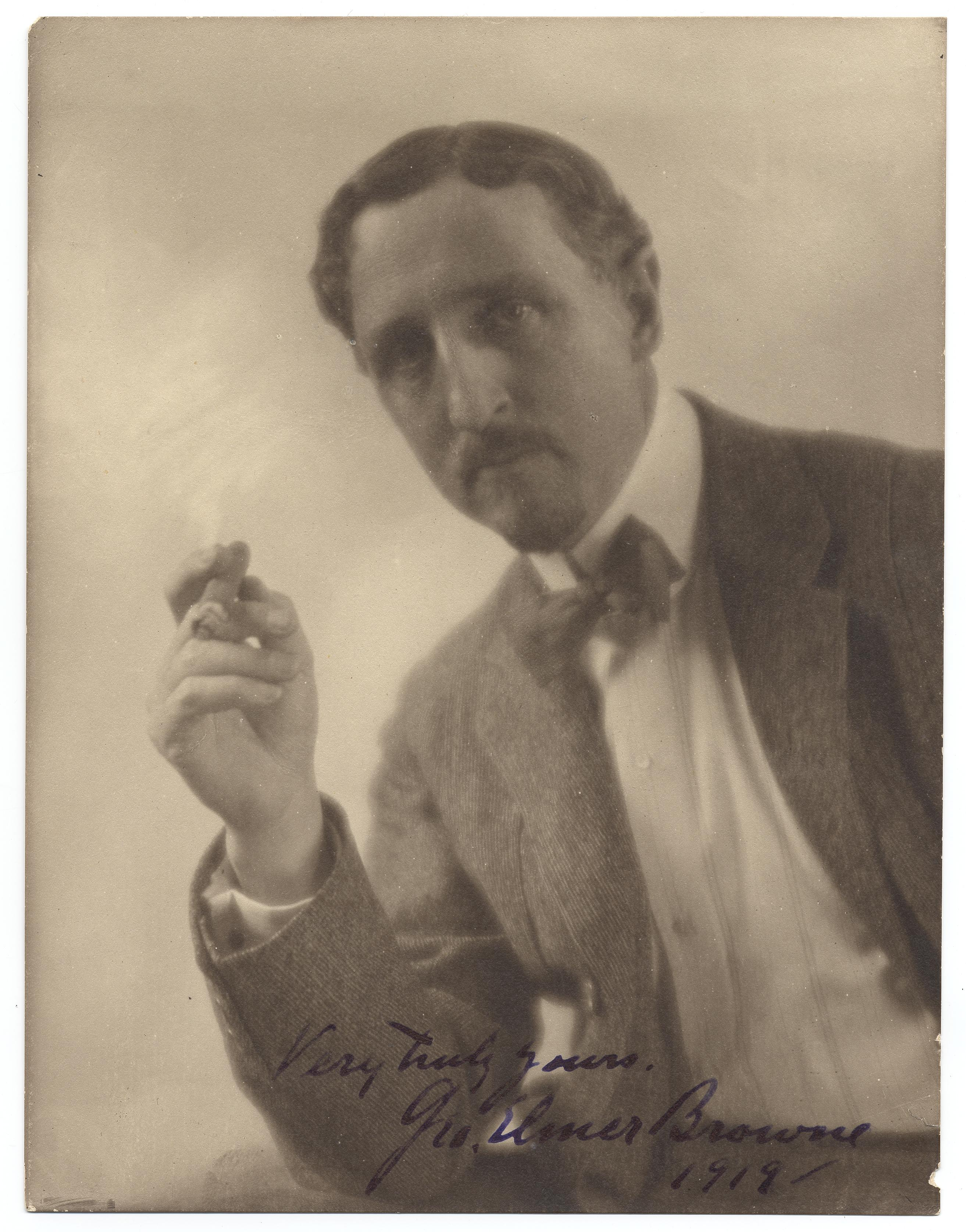
- Browne in 1919
- Born: 1871; Gloucester, Massachusetts, United States
- Died: 1946 (aged 74–75); Provincetown, United States
- Occupation: Artist

George Elmer Browne (May 6, 1871 – July 12, 1946) was an American artist known for his broadly-worked style of painting. Working primarily in oils and watercolors, he specialized in landscapes, marines, urban scenes, figure pieces, and portraits. Although his style was realist, he believed artists should not slavishly copy nature but rather seek to find "the subtle quality which lifts a work of art above the commonplace."

A native of Gloucester, Massachusetts, he was trained in Boston at the art school of the Museum of Fine Arts and the Cowles Art School. He also studied at the Académie Julian in Paris.

He participated in many exhibitions and won quite a few awards, including the French Ordre des Palmes académiques. He belonged to such well-known art organizations as the National Academy of Design, the Salmagundi Club, and Allied Artists of America.

In a side-career as art instructor, he ran a school in Provincetown, Massachusetts, taught art classes at Manhattan's Grand Central School of Art, and was director of painting at Mary Washington College in Fredericksburg, Virginia.

== Early life and training ==
Born in Gloucester, Browne was raised in Salem, Massachusetts where he attended public school. In about 1890, he began three years of study at the Boston Museum of Fine Arts under Frank Benson and Edmund Tarbell. He then spent two years at Boston's Cowles Art School under Joseph DeCamp and Ernest L. Major. Although in his time it was common for American art students to head directly to Paris to complete their education, Browne delayed foreign travel for a few years while he began to establish his professional career. His year of foreign study began about 1901 when he enrolled at the Académie Julian in Paris where Jules Lefebvre and Tony Robert-Fleury were his instructors.

== Art career ==
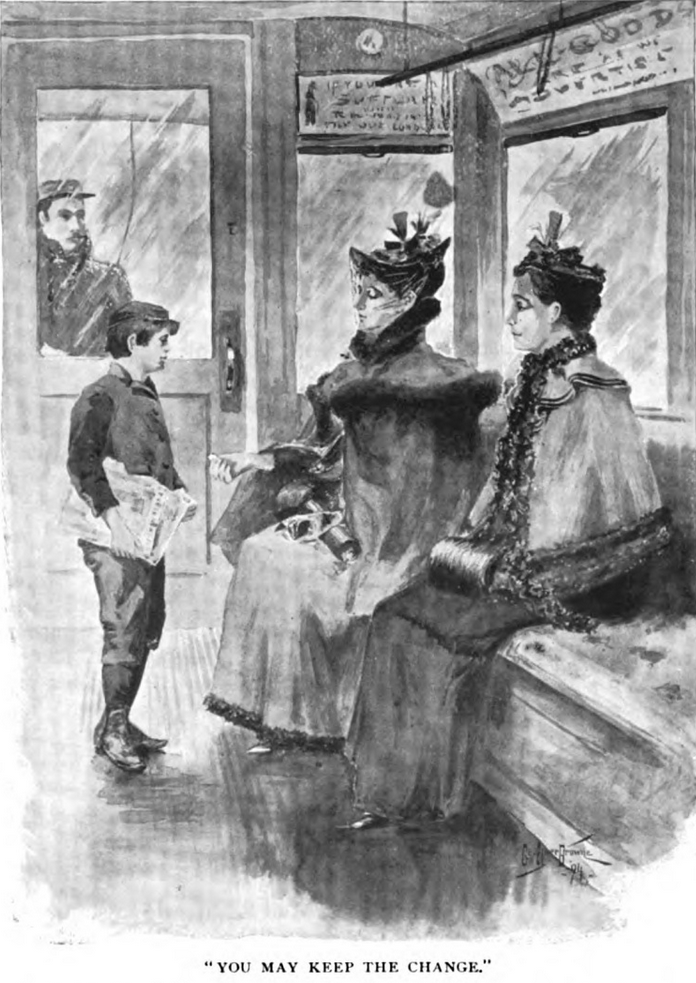
George Elmer Browne, illustration from New England Magazine, December 1894, vol. 11, no. 4, p. 419

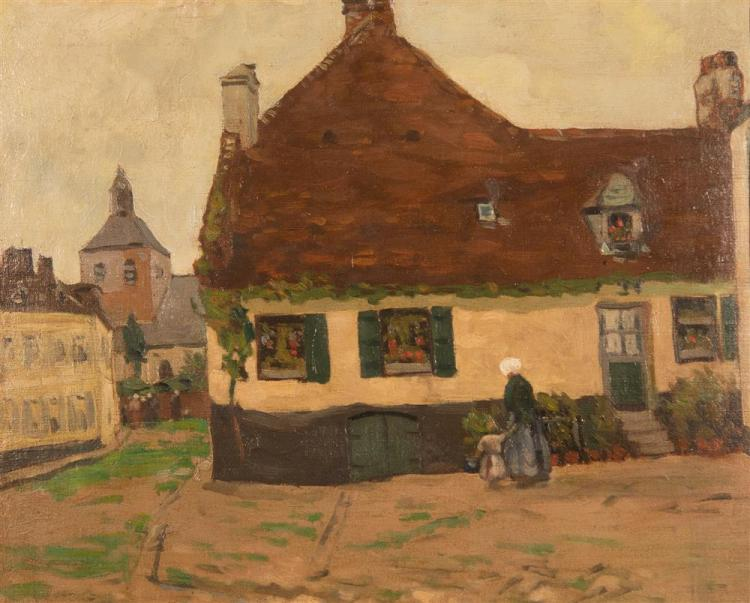
George Elmer Browne, about 1900, Brittany Village Scene, oil on canvasboard, 17 1/2 x 9 inches

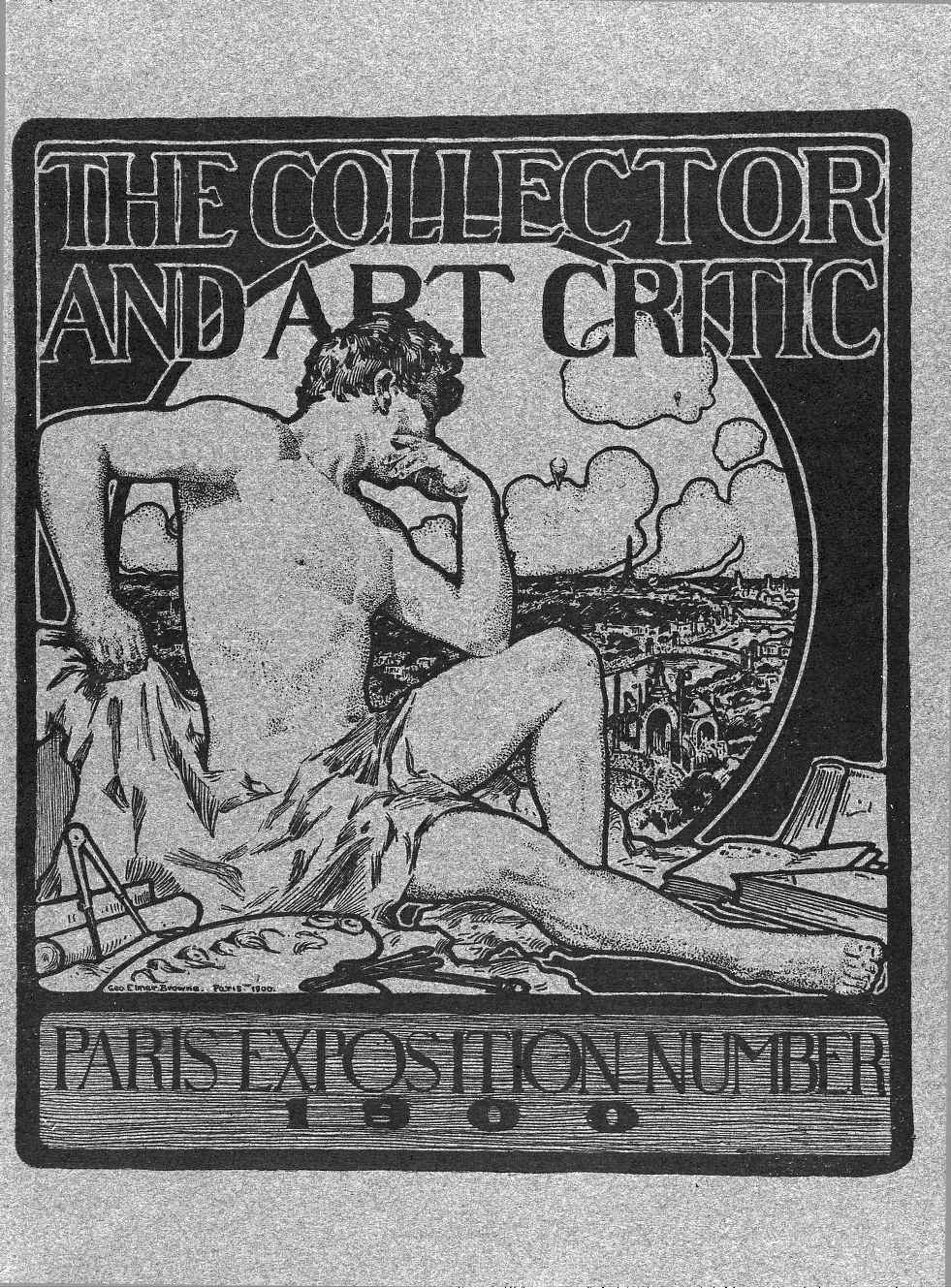
George Elmer Browne, Cover Illustration, Collector and Art Critic magazine, October 1900, vol. 2, no. 14,

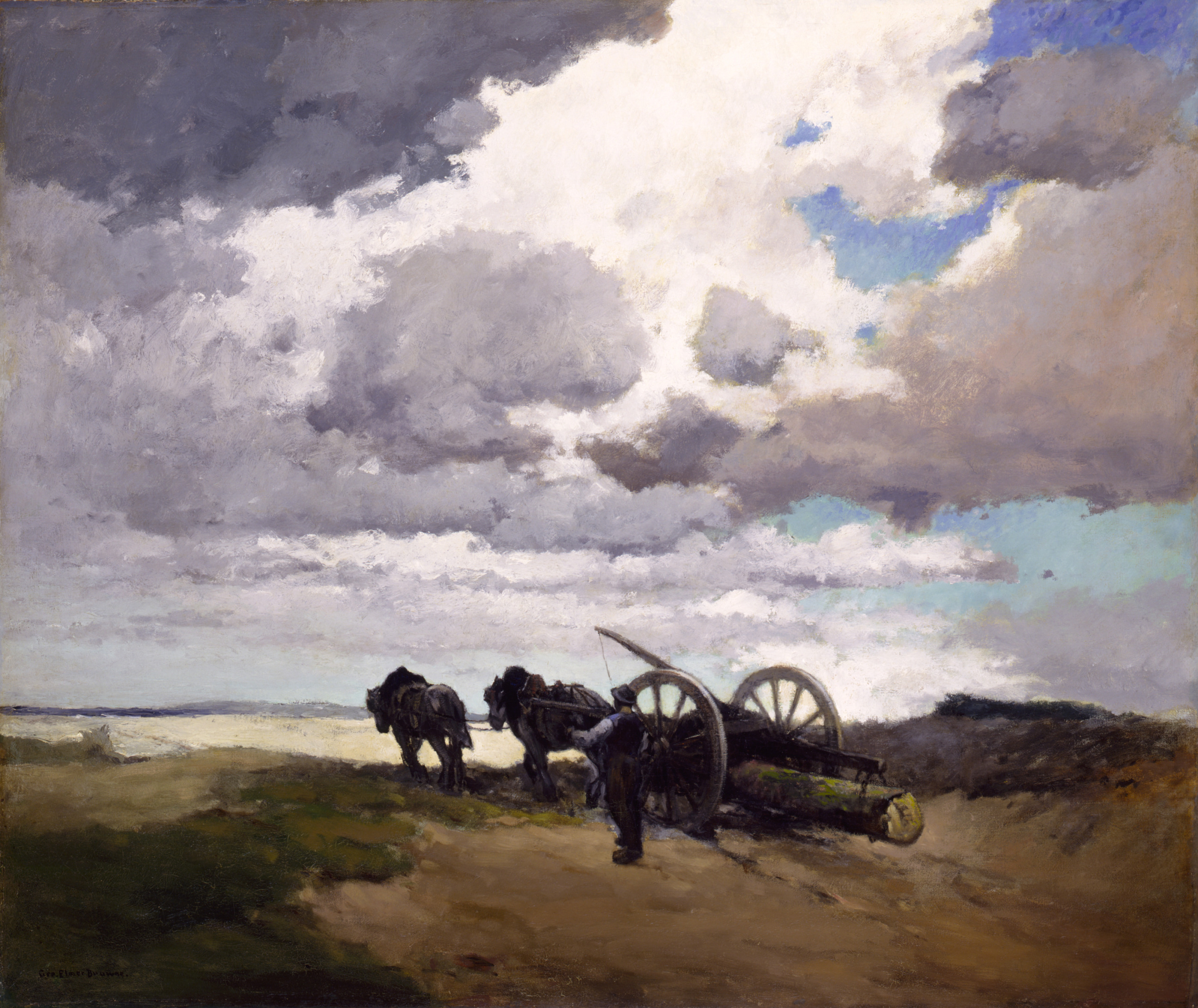
George Elmer Browne, 1909, The Wain Team, oil on canvas, 53 1/2 x 63 5/8 inches

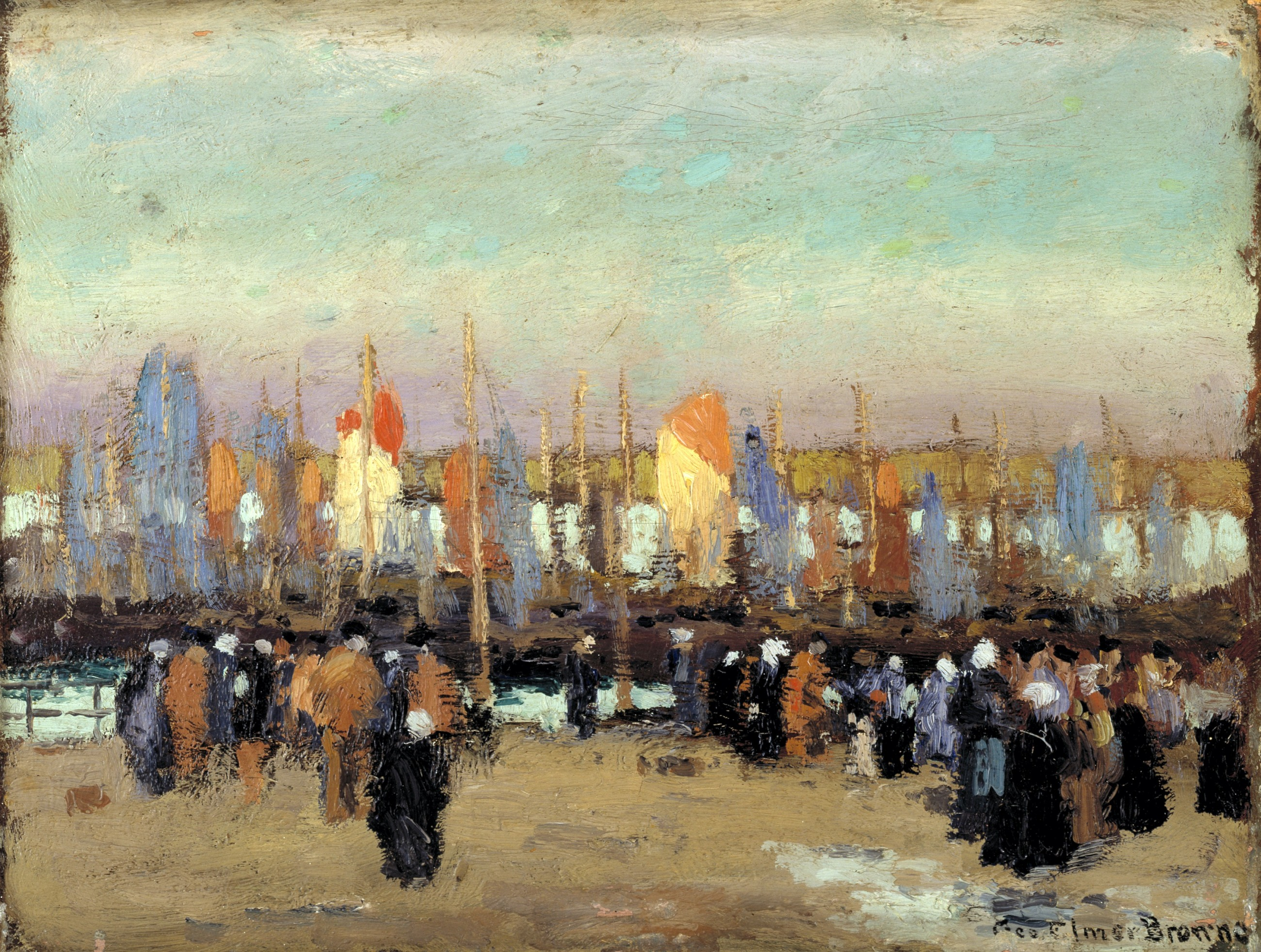
George Elmer Browne, about 1910, Harbor Scene with Fishing Boats, oil on wood, 10 3/8 x 13 3/4 inches

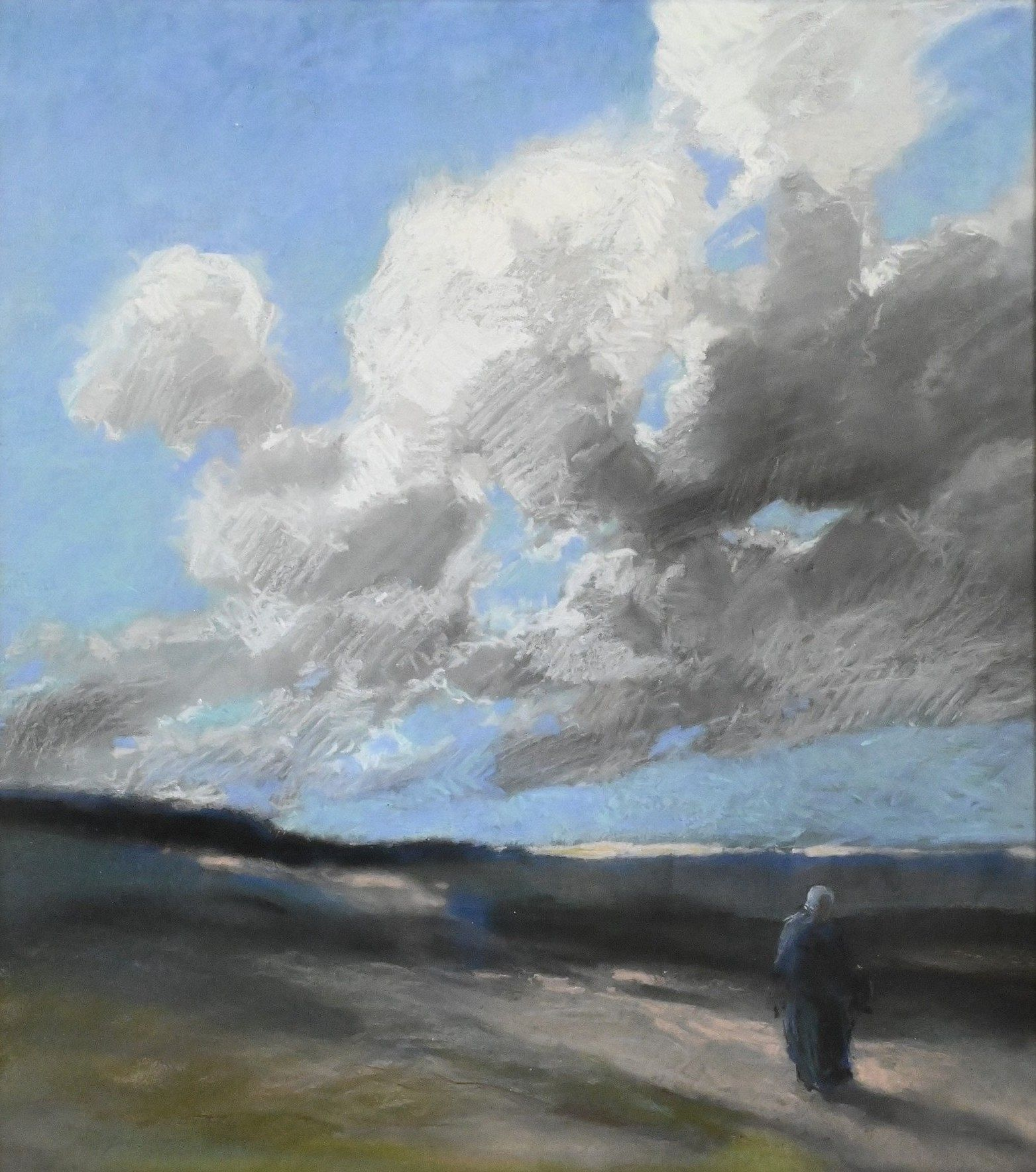
George Elmer Browne, about 1913, Gathering Storm, pastel on paper, 17 x 15 1/2 inches

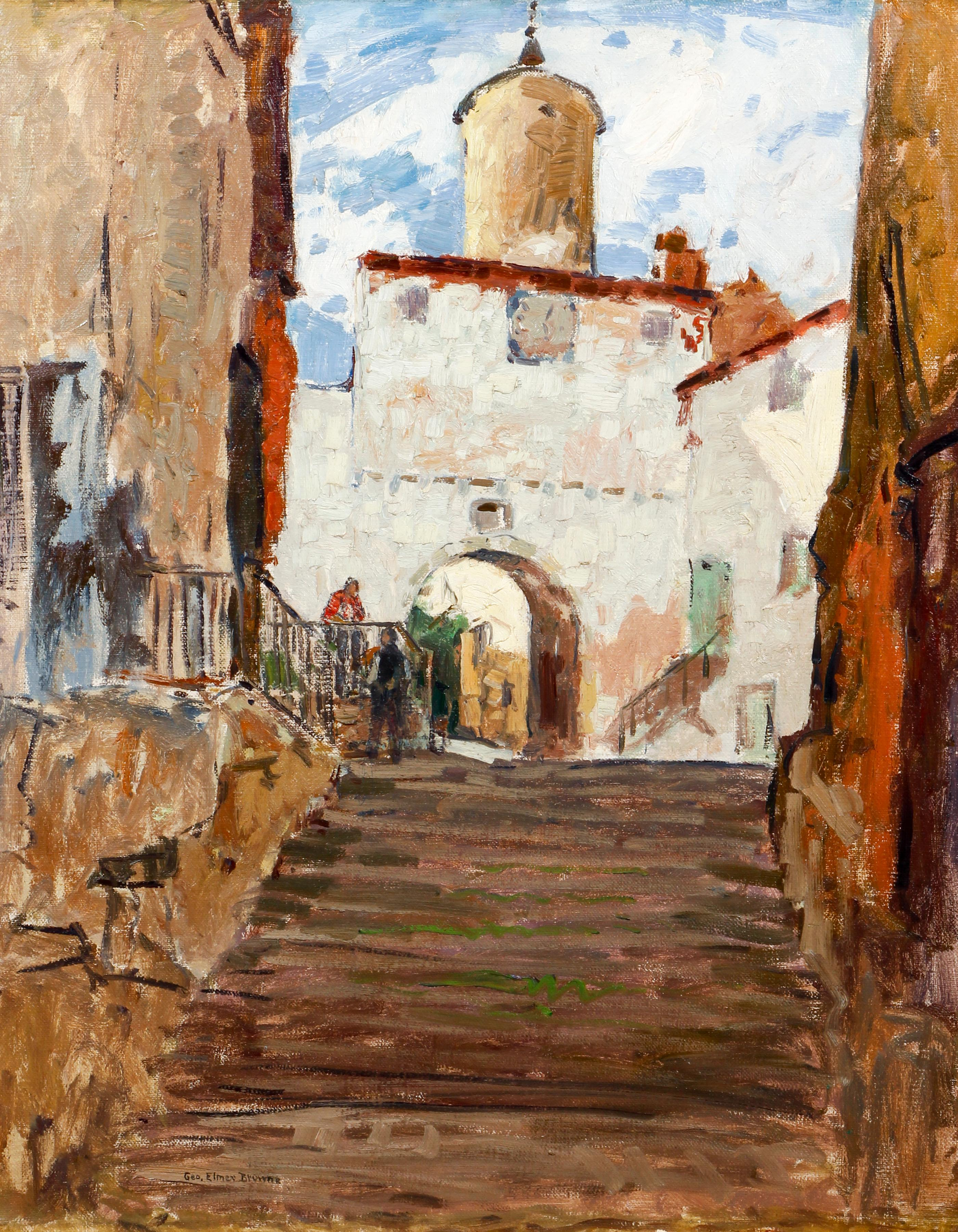
George Elmer Browne, about 1925, The Clock Tower at Cordes, oil on linen canvas, 40 x 32 inches

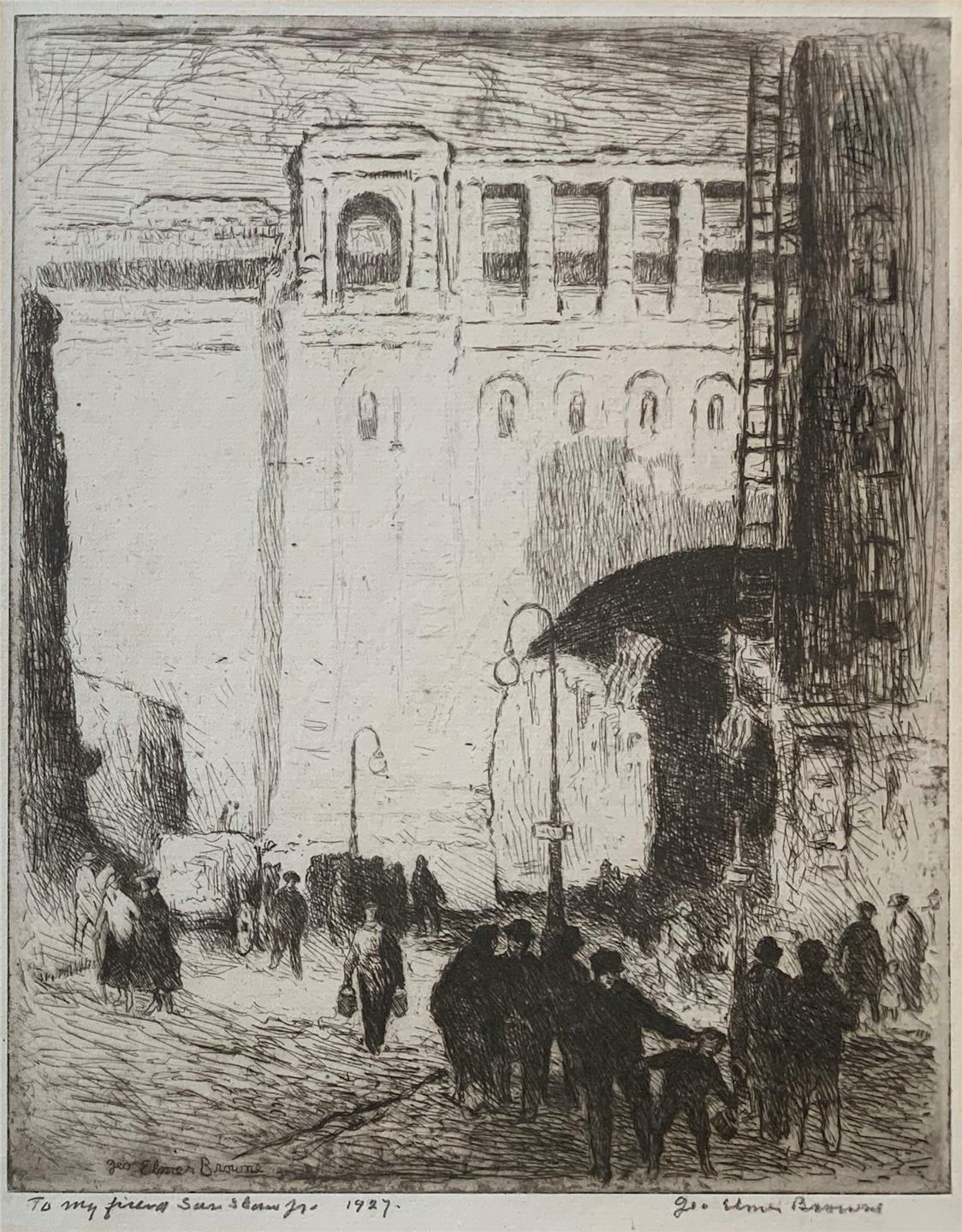
George Elmer Browne, 1927, Train Trestle in New York, etching, 9 7/8 x 7 7/8 inches

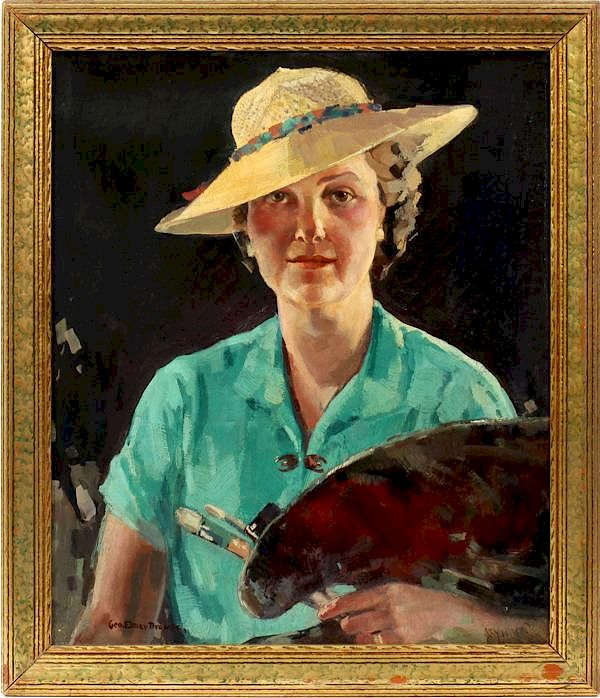
George Elmer Browne, about 1930, An Artist with her Palette, oil on canvas, 24 x 22 inches

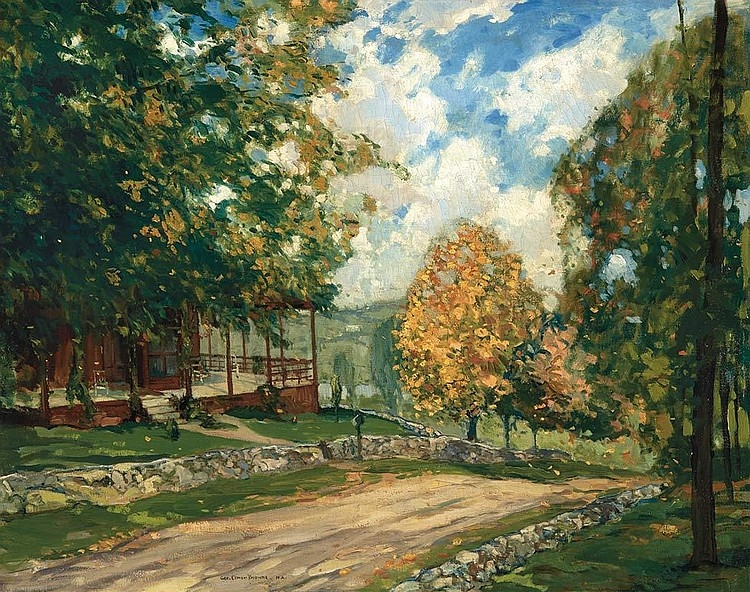
George Elmer Browne, Hideaway Home - Silvermine, oil on canvas, 32 x 40 1/8 inches

=== Exhibitions, awards, and sales ===
In 1894, Browne made illustrations for a Christmas story in New England Magazine called "Change for a Quarter" by Mary A. P. Stansbury. A year later, he exhibited a poster called "The Engraver and Printer" at an exhibition held at Boston's Mechanics' Fair and was awarded a bronze medal for his entry. By 1898, his career was in full swing. He exhibited in the annual exhibition at the National Academy in March, wrote and illustrated with drawings and photographs an article about a small-craft expedition down the length of the Androscoggin River for the July issue of Outing magazine, and, in the fall, participated in exhibitions held by the New York Watercolor Club and the Trans-Mississippi Exposition in Omaha.

In 1899, then living in Manhattan, he was even more active. In February, he showed paintings with other members of a men's social club modeled on the 18th-century London Kit Kat Club and bearing the same name. In April, he exhibited with the Society of American Artists in New York's Fine Arts Building. In May, he participated in an exhibition held by the Salmagundi Club and won a prize for designing a club bookplate. Over the summer months, he organized an outdoor painting class that took students to various locations in the New York area. During the year, two books were published with illustrations he had made: a psychological novel called The Slave of the Lamp by Hugh Stowell Scott (London; Smith, Elder & Co.) and a historical novel called The Man Who Dared by John P. Ritter (New York, G.W. Dillingham). As the year came to an end, he exhibited a painting called "A Provincetown Whaler" in a National Academy exhibition.

While studying at the Académie Julian in 1900, Browne designed the cover of the Paris Exposition issue of The Collector and Art Critic magazine. A year later, while painting in The Netherlands, he had two canvases, "La Vieille Porte à Maret" and "Les Barques Pêcheurs à Boulogne", in the Paris Salon. He also won Salmagundi prizes that year and in 1903. The latter was for a painting called "Drifting Clouds" which a critic had called a "marvelously conceived bit of work". By that time, Browne was back in Manhattan, where he rented an apartment in the Sherwood Studio Building on West 57th Street and began spending the warm months in Provincetown.

In 1904, the French government purchased Browne's "Bait Sellers of Cape Cod" from that year's Salon exhibition for collections of the Palais des Beaux Arts. Critics later said this event brought Browne's name to the art world's attention for the first time. Three years later, he had his first solo exhibition, 20 paintings made mostly in Europe on view at the Knoedler Gallery on Fifth Avenue in Manhattan. The New York Herald's art critic said the show "pleased by its different phases of both scene and treatment." In 1908, the British art journal Studio International printed a profile of Browne. The author said Browne's work was broad and energetic, somewhat lacking in subtlety and "still at the threshold of his noblest ambitions".

When Browne participated in a group show at Knoedler's in 1909, a reviewer for the New York Times dismissed one of his paintings as "unctuous". When he had a second solo at Knoedler's early in 1910, a critic for the New York Daily Tribune praised the "invigorating vitality" in his work and said his work disclosed "considerable talent". Reviewing that show, a critic for American Art News praised the "delicious color and sentiment" in some of his paintings and said Browne "may be ranked among our best American landscape painters." A news report said Browne sold eight paintings from the show.

Later that year and during the next, Browne held a solo exhibition at Chicago's Reinhardt Galleries contributed paintings to a group show at Washington, D.C.'s Corcoran Gallery, and had paintings purchased for the collections of Chicago's Art Institute and the National Gallery of Art in Washington, D.C.

During the decade that preceded the outbreak of World War I, Browne made several trips to Europe. In 1910, for example, he painted in the Grindelwald Valley, Switzerland, near Venice, and especially in Douarnenez on the coast of Brittany. During this time, he continued to show paintings in European galleries such as the Paris Salon and the Kunstverein in Munich.

In 1913, the Knoedler and Reinhardt galleries again gave Browne solos. Critics said the oil and watercolor landscapes in these exhibitions showed a wider range of subjects than his earlier work, displayed "deep and harmonious color", and succeeded in delighting both collectors and casual visitors. The selectors of 1914's show at the Paris Salon chose four of Browne's paintings, the maximum allowed for any applicant. In 1915, he held another solo at the Reinhardt Gallery, in 1917 won a prize for his contribution to a Salmagundi Club exhibition, and in 1918 won critical praise for another solo at Knoedler's. A critic for the New York Post found the paintings in the Knoedler exhibition to have "exuberant energy" but insufficient realism. The critic said Browne was clever and dexterous, but painted too freely, ignoring fine gradations in favor of bold massing of colors. Over the remaining years of Browne's career, he continued to exhibit widely, sell his paintings, and win prestigious prizes.

In 1924, a reporter for the Atlanta Constitution said he was "famous as the winner of many of the highest awards in art." He won National Academy prizes in 1928 and 1934, Salmagundi Club prizes in 1920, 1921, 1937, and 1938, and the Allied Artists of America's gold medal of honor in 1928 and 1934. He was made a French Officier de l'Instruction Publique et des Beaux Arts in 1925 and a Chevalier of the Legion of Honour in 1936. In the 1920s and 1930s, he exhibited frequently in a broad range of galleries, including, especially, the Grand Central Art Galleries in New York. In 1926, the American Magazine of Art published an extensive evaluation of his career.

In 1937, Browne wrote an article for the June issue of the journal Art Instruction. Entitled "The Spirit of Artistic Appeal", it focused on "the subtle quality which lifts a work of art above the commonplace."

== Style and technique ==
Browne mostly made oil paintings and watercolors. He also made some etchings and a few lithographs. He generally sketched outdoors and completed his work in the studio. He advocated careful planning as part of each new project, involving color sketches and studies in pencil or charcoal. A critic noted this thoughtful approach to his art, saying Browne was never casual or flippant in his work. This critic also noted that he might spend a year or more on a single picture.

Browne's paintings were naturalistic but not meticulously so. In his 1937 article in the journal Art Instruction, he said that the artist should eliminate unnecessary detail from his work. "The design", he wrote, "must be so arranged that the observer will at once grasp the real objective."

Critics strained to find adjectives that appropriately described his style. In reviewing a solo exhibition at Chicago's Findlay Galleries in 1940, a critic for that city's Daily Tribune called Browne "one of the greatest living American painters of the non-modernist school." Writing later that year, another commenter saw his approach as a modernized Barbizon style. In 1937, yet another called him a traditionalist who opposed precise copying of nature. In 1926, he was said to use his sense of design and the massing of blocks of color to complement "mere realism".

Browne was celebrated for the wide range of his subjects. He was known for his landscapes, harbor scenes, town and city vistas, but also for his figure composition and portraits. The paintings that were most frequently mentioned in the press tended to be landscapes.

Critics credited Browne with a broad, strong, and vigorous style, one that was "forceful", "virile", and "sane". One said he sometimes took this approach too far, resulting in a "violent straining after the dramatic, too much emphasis on bold masses not enough on detail". Another said that he had lacked subtlety in his early career.

In his handling of color, one critic noted an influence of tonalism, noting the "vibrating harmonics of color with which he endows his canvases." Another said Browne handling of color was not impressionist, adding that his style was marked by the "direct power of color." Browne himself wrote that "color is silent music" that "reflects the emotional refinement of the artist".

== Art teacher ==
During the summer of 1899, Browne led a sketch class that met outdoors in the New York metropolitan area. In 1914, he set up a summer school in Provincetown called West End School of Art. He taught his classes mainly in Cape Cod, but during the 1920s also took them to France. In winters, he taught at the Grand Central School of Art in Manhattan. Two years before his death, he became director of painting at Mary Washington College in Virginia.

== Personal life and family ==
Browne was born on May 6, 1871, in Gloucester and raised in Salem, Massachusetts where his father, Josiah Hill Browne, earned his living as a carpenter. His mother, Katherine N. (Cowen) Browne, had been born in England. He had an older sister named Catherine.

In 1893, he married Lillian Brooks Putnam. In 1894, she gave birth to their son, Harold Cowen Browne. Harold died before Browne. Lillian lived for another decade after Browne's death.

In 1908, Browne told an interviewer that his parents had originally intended him to be a businessman but "he proved himself hopeless with figures" and turned to art.
