= Elizabeth Okie Paxton =

American painter

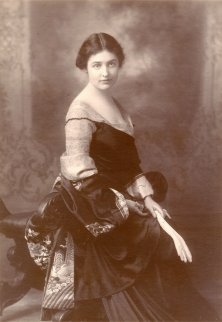
- Born: Elizabeth Vaughan Okie; March 17, 1878; Providence, Rhode Island
- Died: April 2, 1972 (aged 94); Boston, Massachusetts
- Education: Cowles Art School
- Known for: Modern still life and interior paintings
- Notable work: The Breakfast Tray
- Movement: Boston School
- Spouse: William McGregor Paxton

Elizabeth Okie Paxton (1878–1972) (Note: There are primary census, Massachusetts and Social Security death, and S.S. Lafayette (August 19, 1936) travel records that indicate that Elizabeth Okie Paxton was born on March 17, 1878, in Providence, Rhode Island, and died on April 2, 1972, in Boston.) was an American painter, married to another artist William McGregor Paxton (1869–1941). The Paxtons were part of the Boston School, a prominent group of artists known for works of beautiful interiors, landscapes, and portraits of their wealthy patrons. Her paintings were widely exhibited and sold well.

== Early life ==
Elizabeth Vaughan Okie was born in Providence, Rhode Island, the daughter of Dr. Howard Okie (1846–1902) (Note: Howard Okie was born May 12, 1846 in Providence, Rhode Island. He graduated from Brown University in 1866 and from Harvard in 1869. He had a practice on Park Square in Boston by 1883. He died on October 29, 1902 in Boston.) and Elizabeth Vaughn and had one sister Adele.

== Education ==
Okie Paxton studied painting at the Cowles Art School, with Joseph DeCamp and Ernest Major. She also took instruction from William McGregor Paxton, who had been a student at Cowles, during his brief tenure teaching at the school.

== Marriage ==
She was engaged in 1896 to William McGregor Paxton, one of her art instructors, and married him on January 3, 1899. Beginning in 1901, they traveled to Europe together. They often spent their summers on Cape Cod and Cape Ann, and lived in Newton, Massachusetts.

As a great beauty, she served as his muse before and during their marriage, modeling for many of his works, like the painting in which she was dressed for the ball. The couple had no children, instead focusing their creative energy on their work. Okie Paxton put her emphasis on her husband's career, managing it before and after his death at the expense of her career. She moved to Boston's Fenway Studios after her husband died.

William McGregor Paxton's papers—including sketches, correspondence, and photographs—are held at the Archives of American Art at the Smithsonian Institution in Washington, D.C. The papers include Okie Paxton's correspondence about her paintings, exhibitions, and sales of her husband's works. It also contains sketches of her by Paxton.

== Career ==
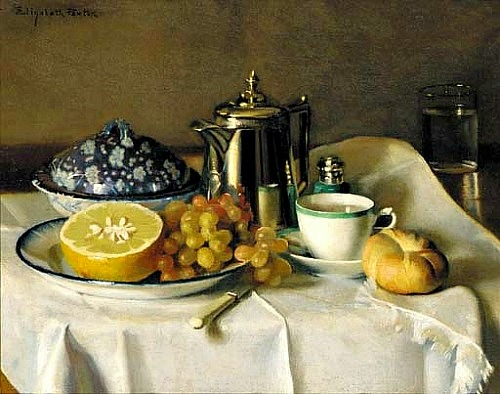
Continental Breakfast, 1907.

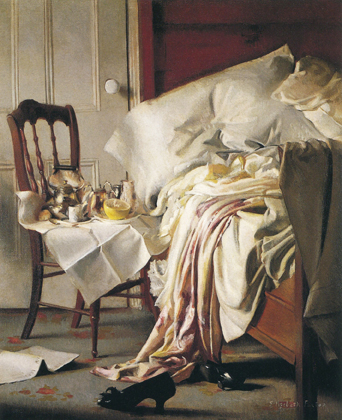
The Breakfast Tray, circa 1910, private collection

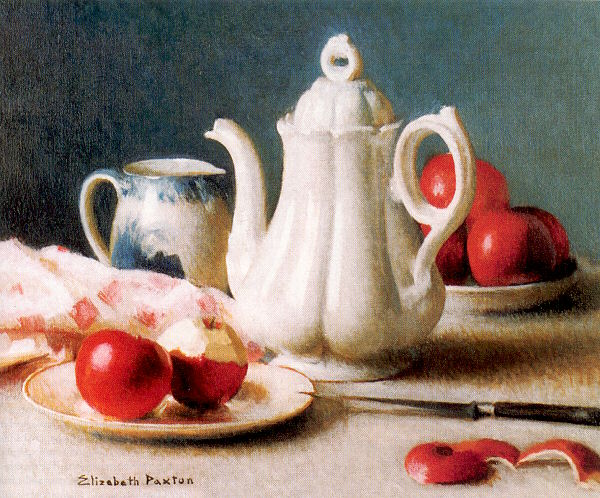
Red Apples, oil on canvas, c. 1920.

Of the Bostonian women artists born in the 19th century, most came from families that provided sufficient financial means to open their own studios and pay for their education. Fortunately, Boston was a city that had a number of great teachers who would teach women, including her husband, William McGregor Paxton; Edmund C. Tarbell; Philip Hale; and William Morris Hunt. Education for women occurred in separate classes and at a higher cost than that for men. Women often went on to study in Europe. Generally women stuck to domestic and still life scenes. Many women married late, regardless of when they married, they often struggled with managing the traditional roles of wife and mother with their career as an artist. Okie Paxton, considered by one art critic to be a better painter than her husband, "painted ravishing still lifes of moments in time". But like Lilian Westcott Hale, who was also a talented artist married to an artist, her career was less important than that of her husband.

Okie Paxton utilized light, texture, and color like that of other artists of the Boston School. Her painting, Continental Breakfast, was shown at Rowland's in Boston and described on May 17, 1907,

...she has set forth a dainty little breakfast, daintily arranged on a crisp, clean white tablecloth; there is a silver coffee-pot, a coffee-cup and a saucer of thin white porcelain, with a light green rim, a brown breakfast roll, a dish of fruit containing a half of a grapefruit and a bunch of grapes, and a covered dish of blue and white hawthorn ware. All these things are painted with so much delicacy and loving care, they are so pretty in themselves, and they are so well related together, that it is a pleasure to look at them. It is a long time since we have seen a better piece of still life work.

— Staff writer of the Boston Evening Transcript

The Breakfast Tray is a provocative bedroom scene. Rather than show pristine interiors typical of the Boston School, however, Okie Paxton depicted a sensual, messy environment, indicating a modern sensibility and sexuality of the occupants. Her work resembled Modernism, rather than the more traditional Boston School. Another modern bedroom scene was used in a Wamsutta sheet advertisement. Her work provided insight into a new emerging woman in the intimate details revealed in the painting:

The protagonist of The Breakfast Tray is a New Woman. She is educated and the beneficiary of improved health care. She advocates for women’s right to vote, to work outside the home, to go to the theater on her own, and to buy objects she uses to create an intimate space all her own, just as we see in The Breakfast Tray. But hers is not a world without men. She is finding new sexual freedom.

— Rena Tobey

By shifting from interior scenes to still life works, Okie Paxton avoided competing with her husband's subjects. Copper Jug with Apples is a still life of a table dressed with a white tablecloth upon which a copper-handled jug, three apples and a green cup and saucer. The painting was priced at $4,600 in 2011.

== Exhibitions and collections ==
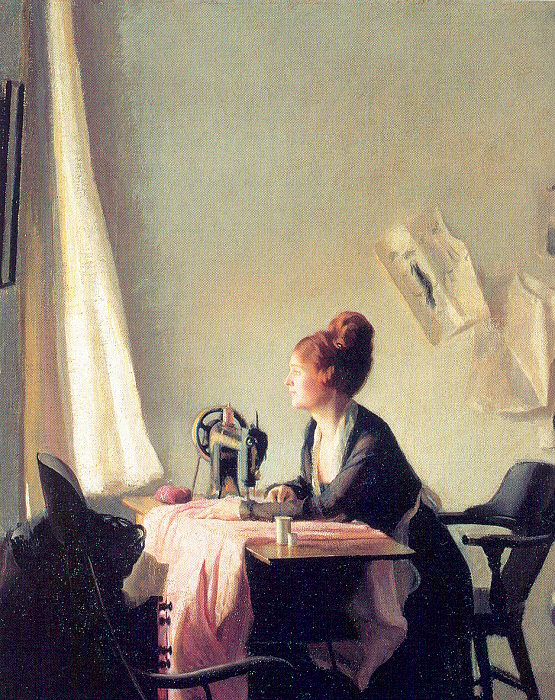
The Open Window, 1922, Museum of Fine Arts, Boston.

Okie Paxton exhibited at the Pennsylvania Academy of the Fine Arts, Philadelphia in 1916 and 1917. She showed in six Corcoran Gallery of Art biennials between 1912 and 1941 and ten exhibitions at the National Academy Museum and School. In 1913, she exhibited The Breakfast Tray, which was called a "dainty yet sound canvas", at the National Academy.

She also exhibited at the Panama–Pacific International Exposition in San Francisco in 1915 and won a silver medal for In the Morning. Okie Paxton exhibited at the 1939 New York World's Fair. She was awarded the Ann Vaughan Hyatt (later Anna Hyatt Huntington) gold medal at the American Artists Professional League, New York, and the National Gold Medal at the Council of American Artists' Societies, New York, 1964.

Her works are held in the collections of the Museum of Fine Arts, Boston; Maryhill Museum of Art, Goldendale, WA; and the Concord Art Association, Concord, MA. Because her works sold quickly to private collectors when exhibited, she is not well represented in public collections.

== Legacy ==
- On an April 25, 1943, broadcast, Barbara Walker said of Okie Paxton's work:

Art lovers who like superb painting will be impressed with the works of Mrs. Elizabeth Paxton, widow of the renowned portrait painter. Her still lifes and landscapes are of a high caliber, with a veritable "old master" technique; done with a skill and charm far above the average painter of today.

— Barbara Walker

- Her work, The Breakfast Tray,—along with that of William Merritt Chase, Alice Neel, John Singleton Copley and Roy Lichtenstein— appears in Art and Appetite: American Painting, Culture, and Cuisine, edited by Judith A. Barter.
- Okie Paxton's work was represented in a 2001 exhibition of women artists at the Boston Museum of Fine Arts entitled "A Studio of Her Own:Women Artists in Boston 1870–1940". The works of Polly Thayer, Gertrude Fiske, Gretchen Rogers, Lilian Westcott Hale, and Ellen Day Hale were shown. Three of Paxton's works were exhibited: The Breakfast Tray (c. 1910); The Open Window (1922), reminiscent of Johannes Vermeer; and the subtly hued Breakfast Still Life (c. 1923).
