= Amy Maria Sacker =

American artist

- Born: July 17, 1872; Boston, Massachusetts
- Died: 1965 (aged 92–93)
- Known for: Book design

Amy Maria Sacker (1872–1965) was an American book designer, illustrator, painter, and teacher. She was best known for her illustrations of children's books as well as designs of book covers and plates.

== Education ==
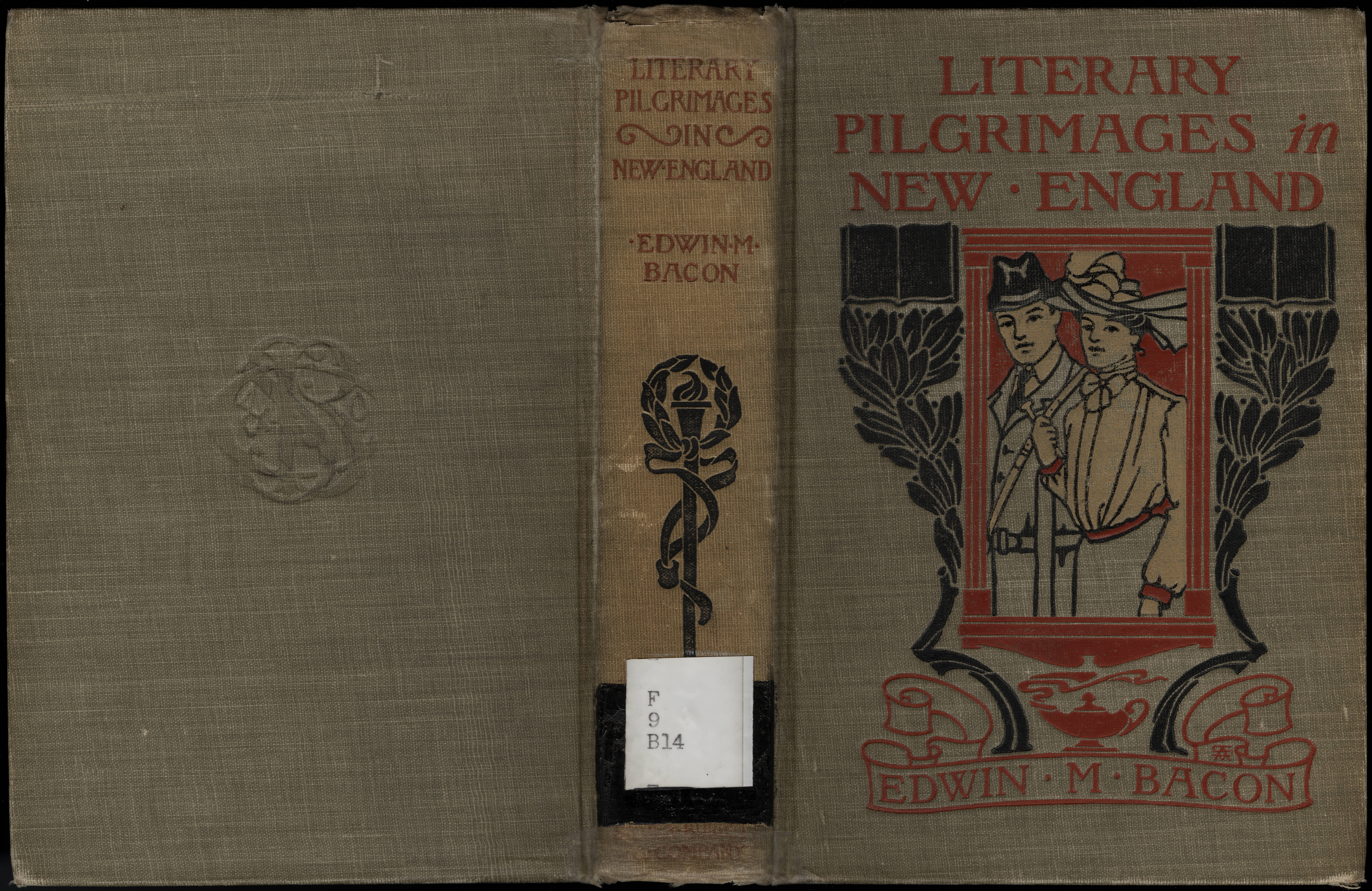
1902 book binding designed by Amy Sacker; original held by the University of North Carolina Greensboro Library, Special Collections and Archives

Sacker was born in Boston on July 17, 1872. As a student at the School of the Museum of Fine Arts, Boston in Boston from 1889 to 1894, Sacker studied under well-known architect, designer, and instructor Charles Howard Walker as well as Joseph DeCamp and Joseph Lindon Smith. In 1892 she won a scholarship for her exemplary work and in 1893 she won a prize for the highest average.

Upon graduation, Sacker began teaching decorative design at the Cowles Art School. In 1901, Sacker founded her own school named the Sacker School of Design and Interior Decoration, where she taught for over 40 years.

== Work ==
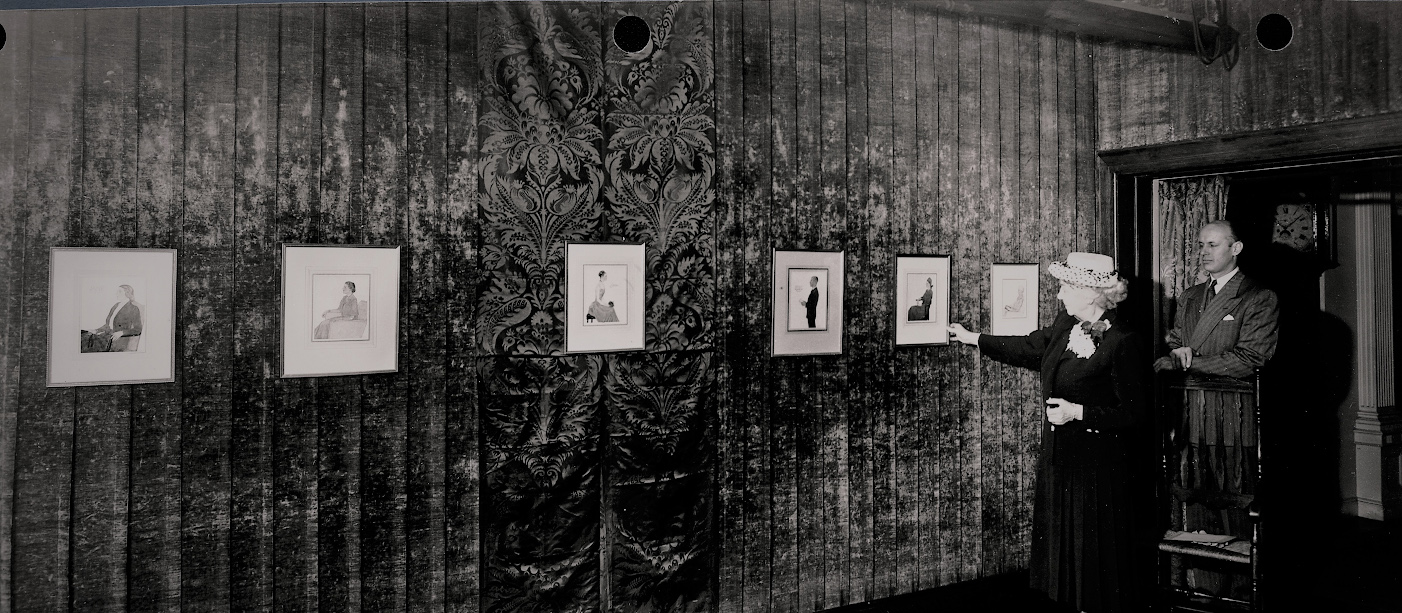
Amy Sacker looking at her art show

Her designs were used on book covers (which sometimes showed up as designs on book jackets) and bookplates, which were also sometimes reused as magazine covers. She designed book covers for several local publishers including Joseph Knight, Estes & Lauriat, L.C. Page & Co, Houghton Mifflin, and Little, Brown. She developed a style that distinguished her from other female contemporaries, such as Sarah Wyman Whitman and Margaret Neilson Armstrong. She illustrated books with figurative compositions that occupied the entire front instead of typical ornamental patterns. Domestic publishers used her designs several times for different books. Sacker won a bronze medal in 1901 for her book covers at the Pan-American Exposition in Buffalo and a medal in 1930 for her book plates at the Boston Tercentenary Fine Arts and Crafts Exhibition.

Beyond book design Sacker applied her artistic skills to a wide range of other arts, including, illustrations, paintings, jewelry, basketry, leatherworking, portraiture, and greeting cards. In 1899, Sacker was elected a master craftsman as a designer, illustrator, and leather worker in the Society of Arts and Crafts. Through her work in this institution, Sacker met several of the leading women artists of the day, including Sarah Wyman Whitman and Marion Peabody. She gave instruction at Simmons College, made study tours to Europe and took part in several exhibitions across the USA. Together with her former teachers Walker and Smith Sacker served on the jury for a Boston exhibition in 1912. Sacker ended finally in the mid-1940s her work with her namesake school to focus on projects for the Red Cross.
