= William McGregor Paxton =

American painter (1869–1941)

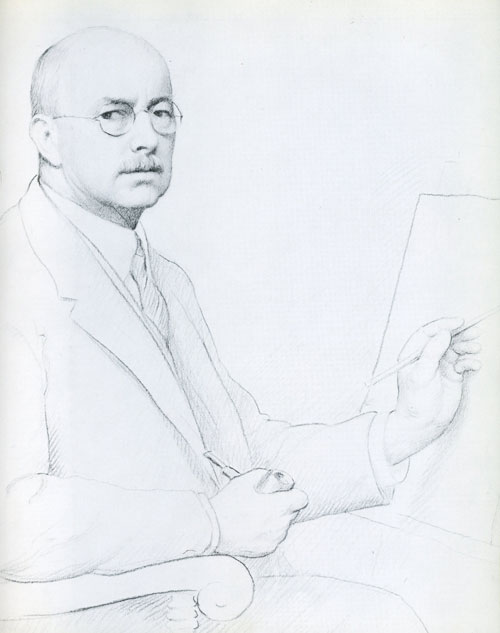
- Self-portrait, c. 1910
- Born: June 22, 1869; Baltimore, Maryland, US
- Died: 1941; Newton, Massachusetts
- Education: Cowles Art School, Jean-Léon Gérôme
- Spouse: Elizabeth Okie Paxton

Museum of Fine Arts Boston

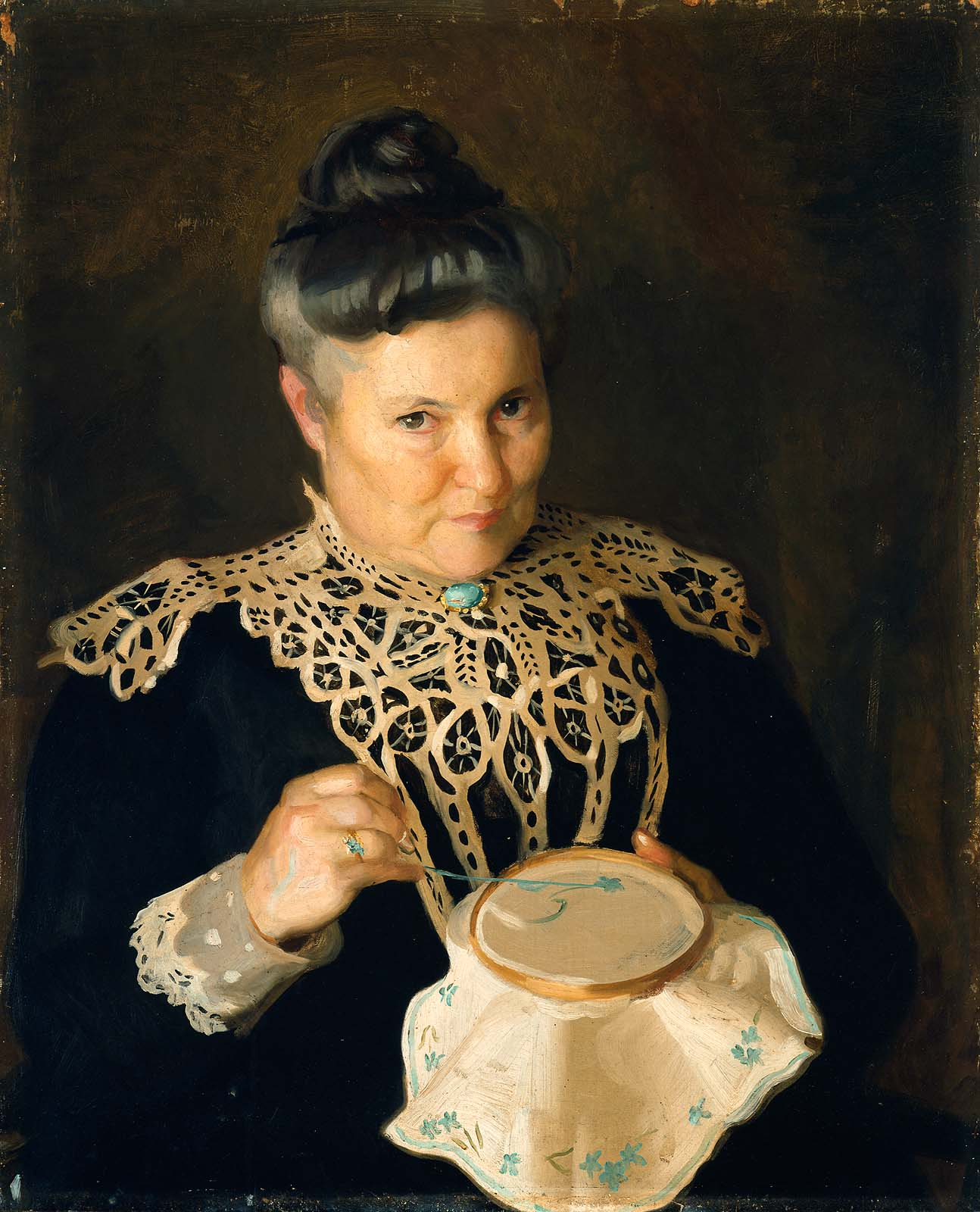
Portrait of the Artist's Mother (Rose Paxton), 1902

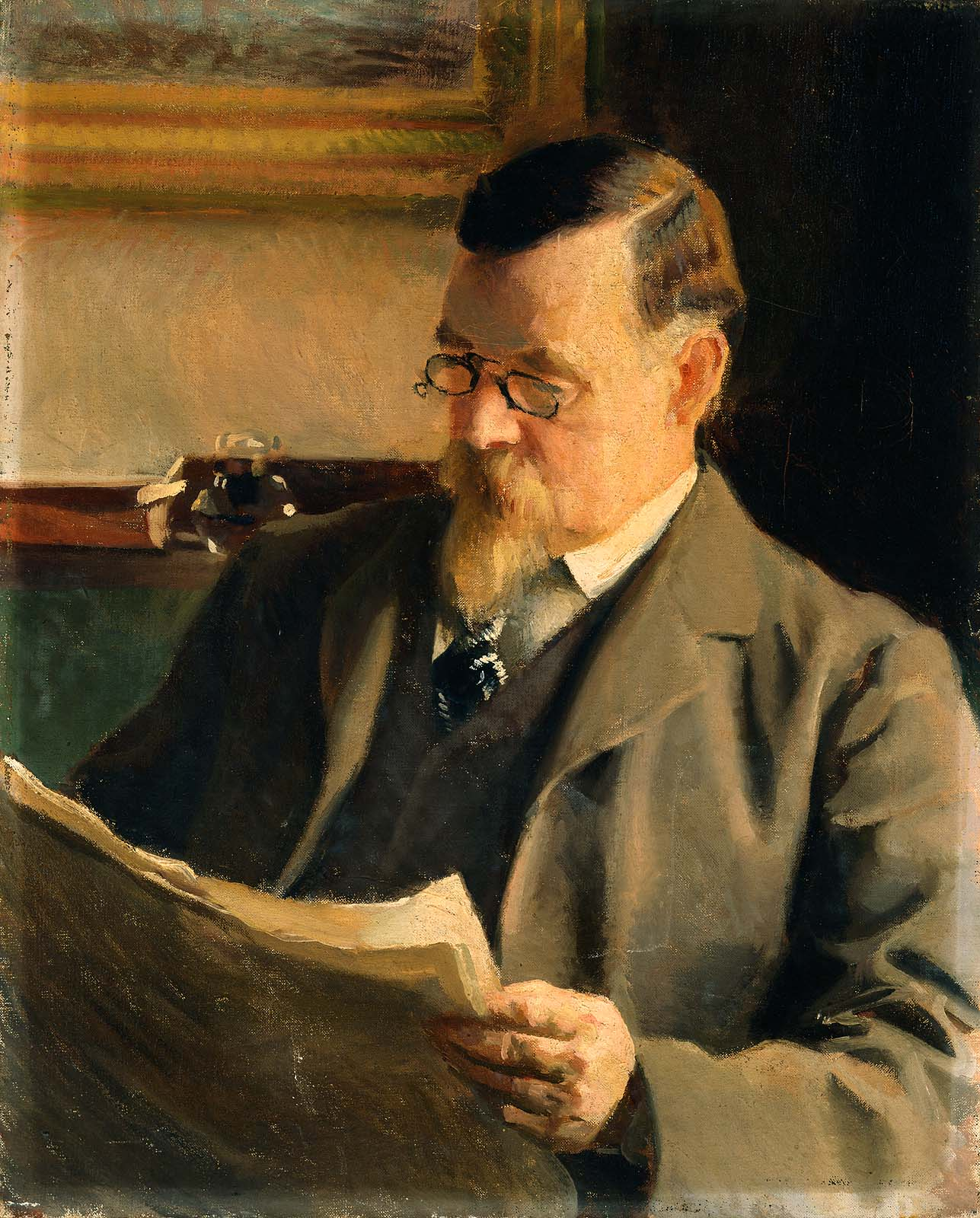
Portrait of the Artist's Father (James Paxton), 1902

Paintings of his wife, Elizabeth Okie Paxton

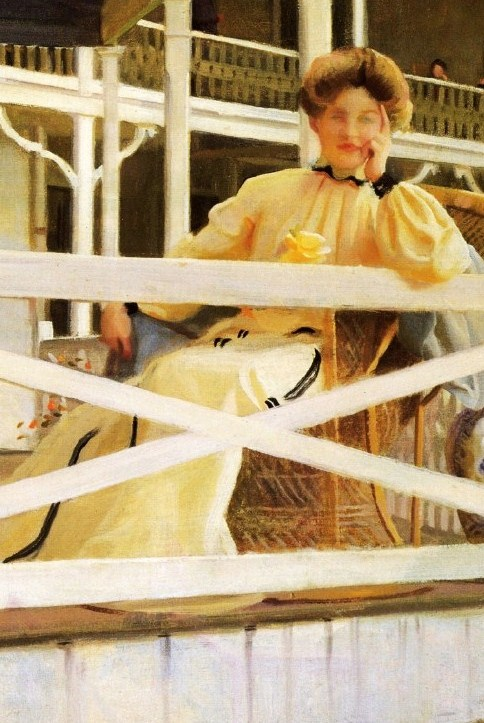
The White Veranda, 1902

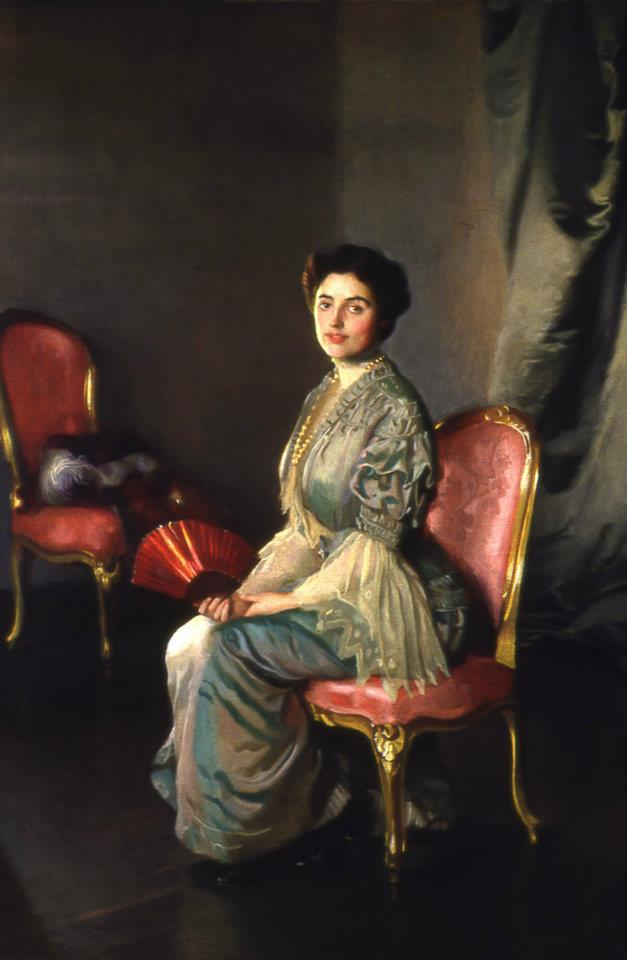
The Red Fan, 1906, Maryhill Museum of Art

William McGregor Paxton (June 22, 1869 – 1941) was an American painter and instructor who embraced the Boston School paradigm and was a co-founder of The Guild of Boston Artists. He taught briefly while a student at Cowles Art School, where he met his wife Elizabeth Okie Paxton, and at the Museum of Fine Arts School in Boston. Paxton is known for his portraits, including those of two presidents—Grover Cleveland and Calvin Coolidge—and interior scenes with women, including his wife. His works are in many museums in the United States.

== Early life ==
He was born on June 22, 1869, in Baltimore to James and Rose Doherty Paxton. William's father moved the Paxton family and established a catering business in Newton Corner, Massachusetts, in the mid-1870s.

== Education ==
Paxton attended Cowles Art School on a scholarship he attained at the age of 18. He studied with Dennis Miller Bunker and Cowles and then went to Paris to study under Jean-Léon Gérôme, at École des Beaux-Arts. Maryhill Museum of Art said he also studied at Académie Julian in Paris. He returned to Cowles and studied with Joseph DeCamp, who also taught Elizabeth Vaughan Okie. She became Paxton's student and then his wife.

== Marriage ==
Paxton became engaged in 1896 to Elizabeth Vaughan Okie, and they married on January 3, 1899. They traveled to Europe together and often spent their summers on Cape Cod and Cape Ann. They lived in Newton, Massachusetts, first on Elmwood Street with his parents. About 1916 they resided or had a studio on Ipswich Street in Fenway Studios in Boston. They later purchased a house in Newton Center on Montvale Road.

Paxton's wife managed his career and modeled for many of his works, like the painting in which she was dressed for the ball. "William McGregor Paxton... benefited from an art-savvy wife who supported his career, using her energy in the bet that his offered the more secure future," said author and art historian Rena Tobey. The couple had no children.

== Career ==
Paxton taught from 1906 to 1913 at the Museum of Fine Arts School and painted briefly at Fenway Studios in Boston. He worked at the Harcourt Street Studios in Boston and when it burned in 1904 he lost close to 100 paintings. He then went to the Fenway Studios for a brief period but then moved on to the Riverway Studios, also in Boston. He is primarily known for his portraits and painted both Grover Cleveland and Calvin Coolidge. Maryhill Museum of Art says of his artistry, "Paxton was well known for the attention he gave to the effects of light and detail in flesh and fabric. His works often present idealized views of women, such as this portrait (The Red Fan) of his wife Elizabeth", like Henry James's portrayal of women in his novels The Portrait of a Lady (1881) or The American (1877). His models, often daughters and wives of his patrons, were depicted as refined, cultured women of "conspicuous leisure", and equated with the "precious aesthetic objects surround them", like the women of Thorstein Veblen's Theory of the Leisure Class (1899) who reflect the wealth of their husbands or fathers. He crafted elaborate compositions with models in his studio, using props that appear in several paintings.

Paxton and several other Bostonian artists were inspired by Johannes Vermeer. The Metropolitan Museum of Art says of Paxton's Tea Leaves (1909) in their collection:

In a windowless parlor permeated by soft light, a dreamy atmosphere, and the sounds of silence, two elegant women pass the time by doing very little or nothing at all. Paxton hints at a narrative, but he asks that the viewer invent it, recapitulating the ambiguity of Vermeer's paintings, which he admired.

Paxton employed a technique where only one area in his compositions was entirely in focus, while the rest was somewhat blurred, something he called "binocular vision" and credited to Vermeer. He began to employ this system in his own work, including The New Necklace, where only the gold beads are sharply defined while the rest of the objects in the composition have softer, blurrier edges.

Paxton is one of the key figures in the Boston School of painting and a co-founder of The Guild of Boston Artists with Frank Weston Benson and Edmund Charles Tarbell. As a member of the St. Botolph Club, Paxton played baseball with sculptor and friend Cyrus Dallin. Between 1926 and 1927, he was interviewed by Dewitt Lockman with 85 other artists and architects associated with the National Academy of Design. Records from the interview are held at the New York Historical Society and the Archives of American Art. Paxton was made a full member of the National Academy of Design in 1928.

Paxton died of a heart attack when he was painting his wife in their Montvale Road living room. He was 72 years of age. An exhibition was held in his memory at the Museum of Fine Arts, Boston from November 19 through December 14, 1941. His papers—including sketches, correspondence, and photographs—are held at the Archives of American Art at the Smithsonian Institution in Washington, D.C.

== Other selected paintings ==
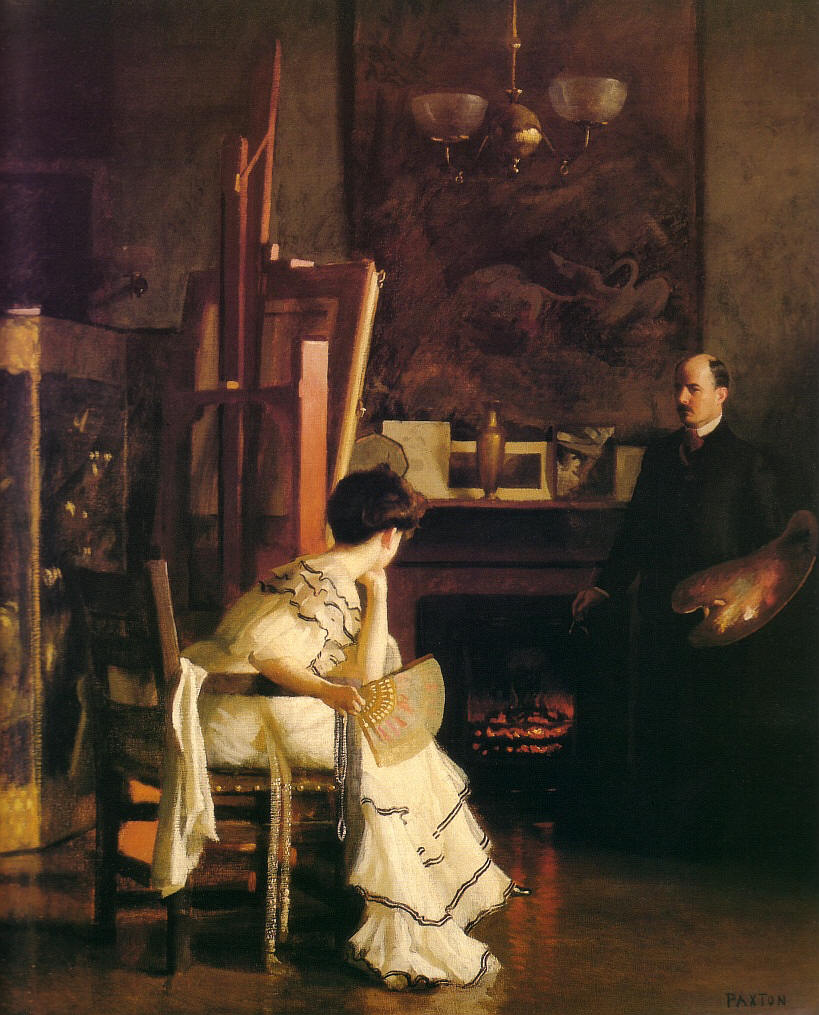
In the studio, 1905

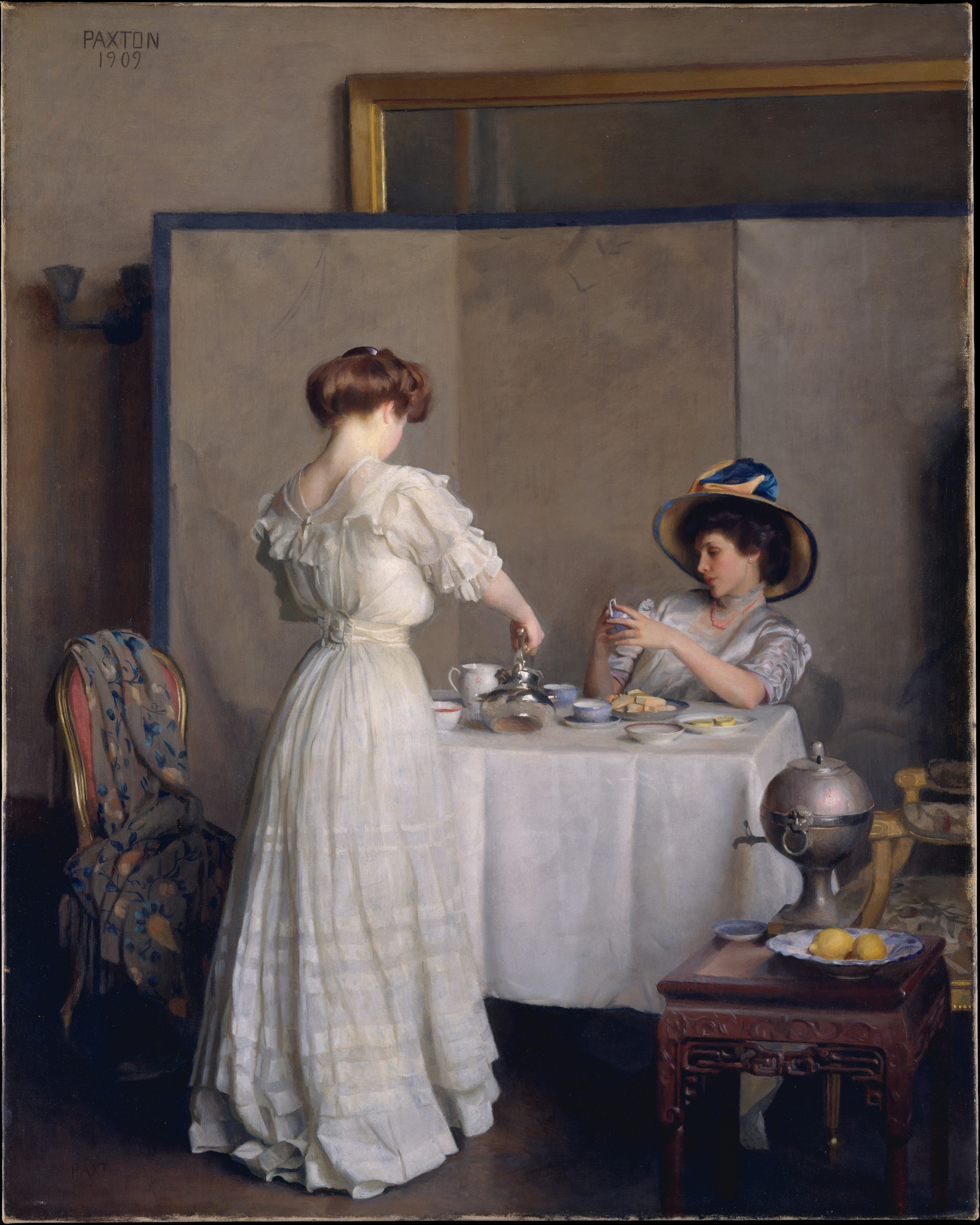
Tea Leaves, oil on canvas, 1909, Metropolitan
Museum of Art

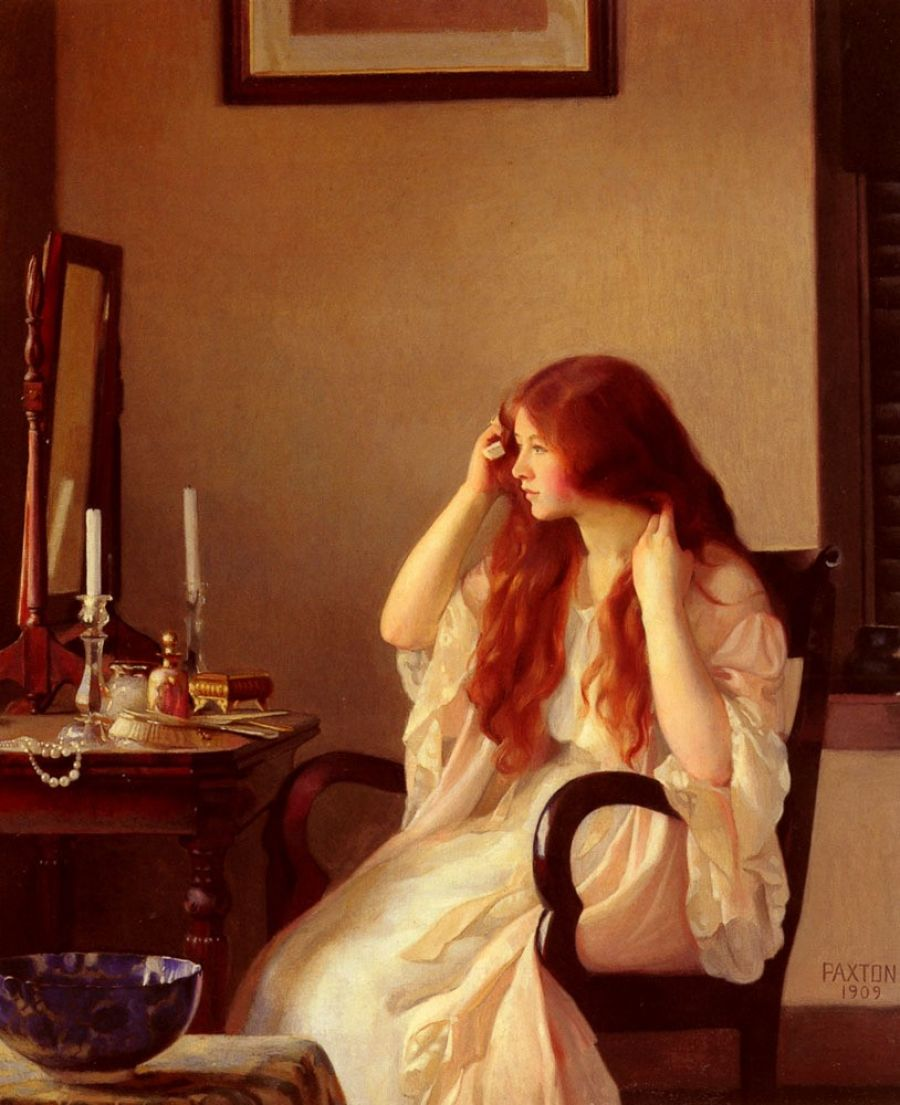
Girl combing her hair or Young girl with a mirror, 1909,

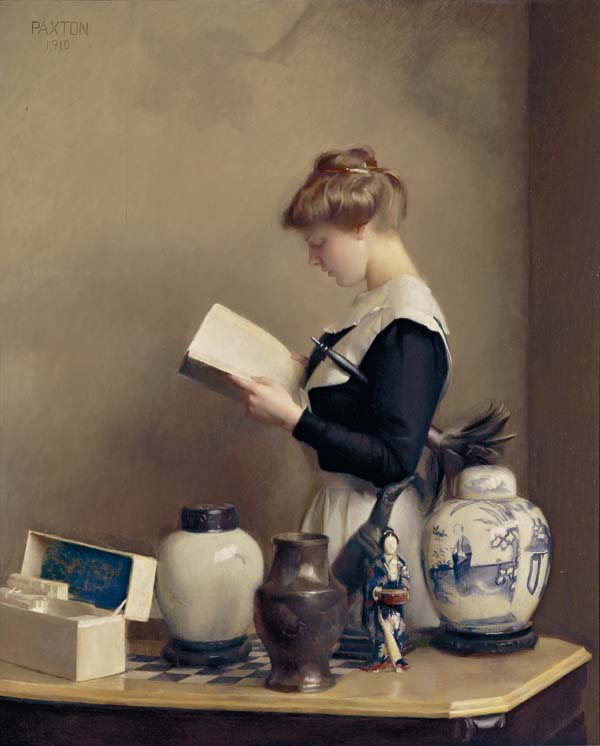
The House maid, 1910 - Washington National gallery

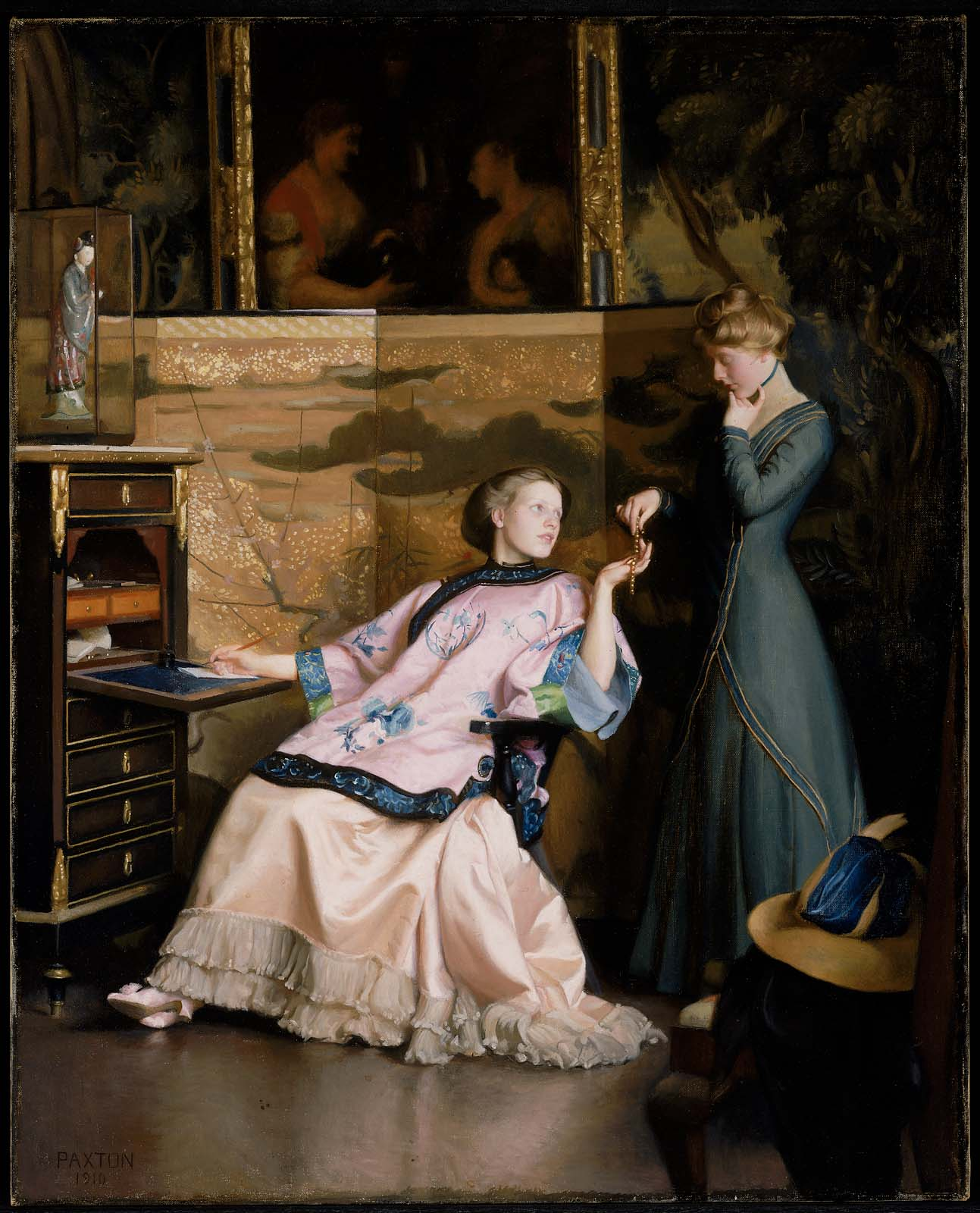
The New Necklace, 1910, Museum of Fine Arts, Boston

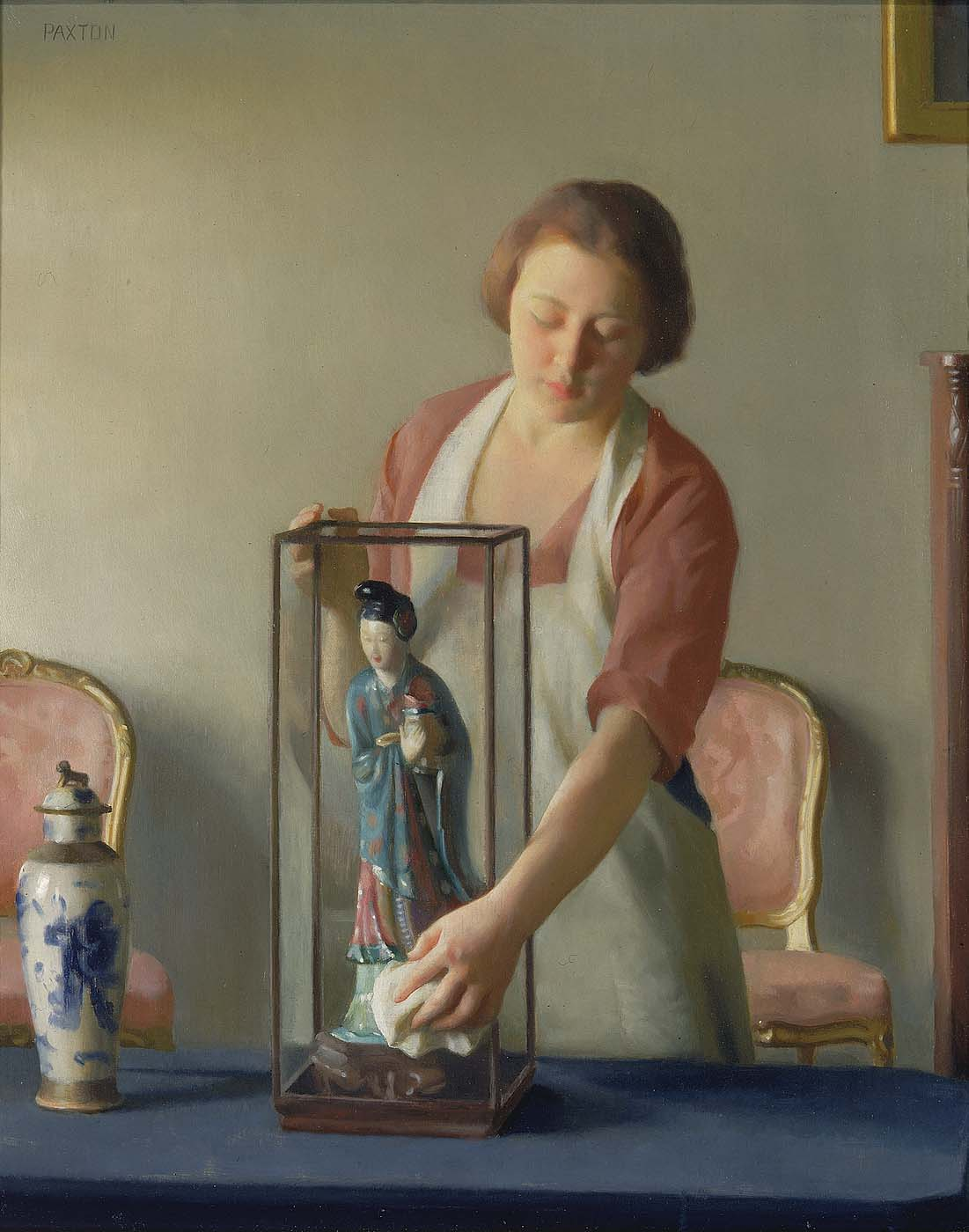
The Figurine, 1921, Smithsonian American Art Museum

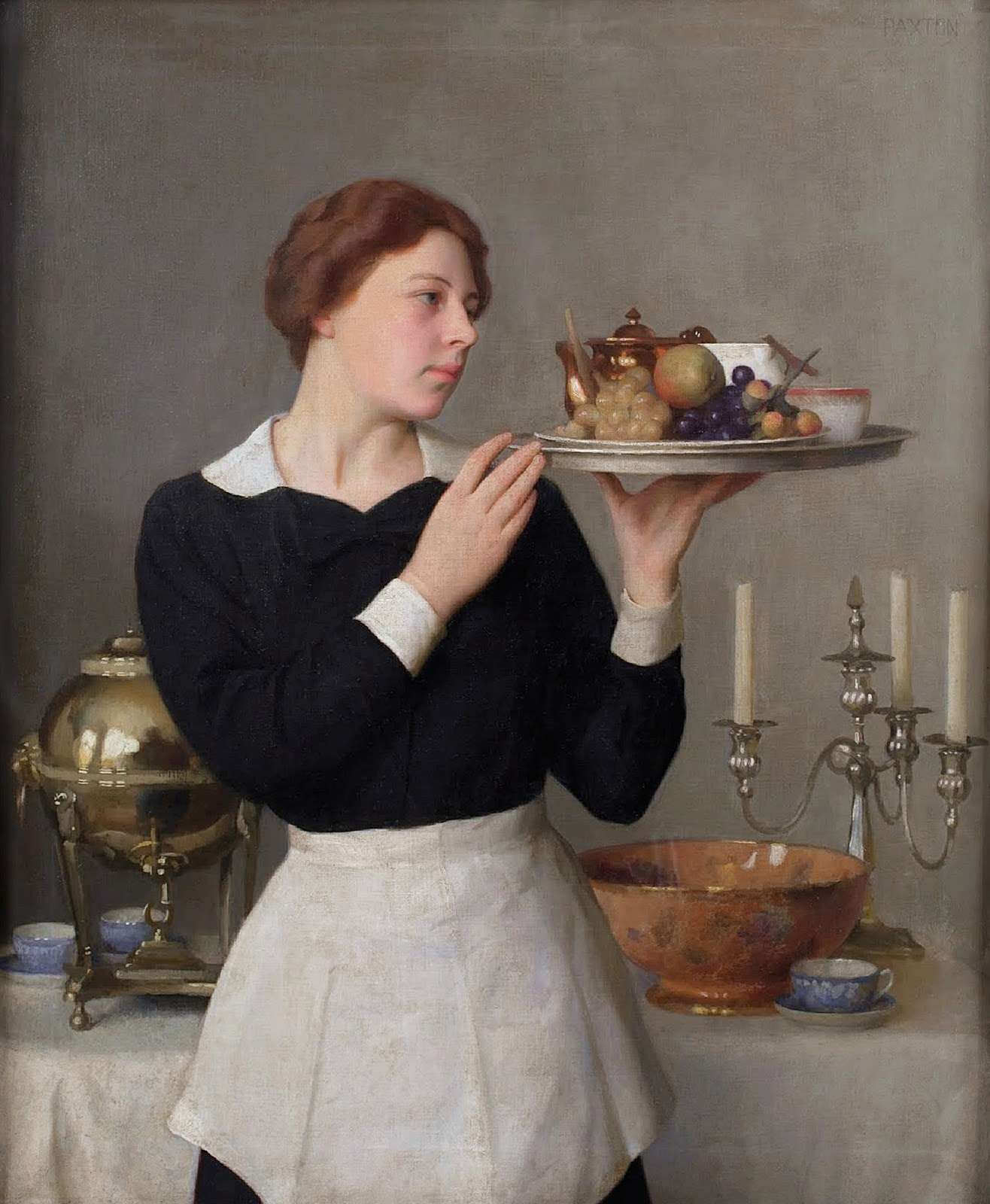
The Waitress, 1923 - New-York, National Academy Museum

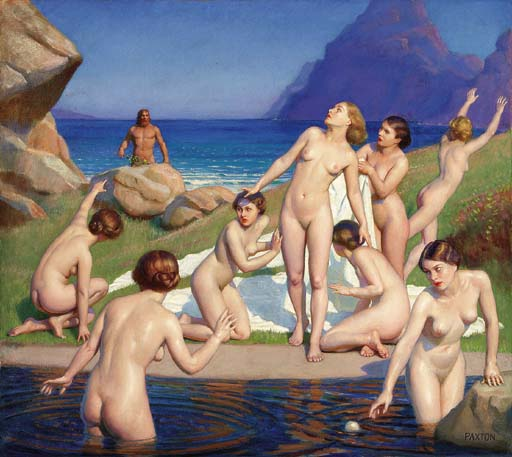
Nausicaa, circa 1941

== Collections ==
- Brooklyn Museum, New York
- Butler Institute of American Art, Youngstown, Ohio
- Cleveland Museum of Art, Ohio
- Davis Museum and Cultural Center, Wellesley College, Massachusetts
- Detroit Institute of Arts, Michigan
- Indianapolis Museum of Art, Indiana
- Maryhill Museum of Art, Washington state
- Metropolitan Museum of Art, New York
- Museum of Fine Arts, Boston.
- National Academy Museum and School, New York
- Pennsylvania Academy of the Fine Arts, Philadelphia, Pennsylvania
- Princeton University Art Museum, New Jersey
- Sheldon Museum of Art, University of Nebraska–Lincoln, Nebraska
- Smithsonian American Art Museum, Washington, D.C.
- Union League of Philadelphia,
