= Annie Hurlburt Jackson =

American artist (1877–1959)

- Born: August 19, 1877; Minneapolis, Minnesota, US
- Died: 1959 (aged 81–82); Boston, Massachusetts, US
- Known for: Portrait miniatures

Annie Hurlburt Jackson (1877–1959) was an American artist known for her miniature and portrait painting.

== Life and career ==
Jackson was born in Minneapolis, Minnesota, in 1877. She studied with Charles Webster Hawthorne, Eliot O'Hara, Hermann Dudley Murphy, Eric Pape, and Charles Herbert Woodbury. She was a member of the American Federation of Arts, the American Society of Miniature Painters, the Copley Society of Art, The Guild of Boston Artists, and the Pennsylvania Society of Miniature Painters.

From 1896 to 1959, Jackson lived in Brookline, Massachusetts, in the household of her brother, Robert Fuller Jackson, an architect, painter, and educator. She died in Boston in 1959.

Jackson's work is held in the permanent collections the Brooklyn Museum, the Cincinnati Art Museum, the Currier Museum of Art, the Museum of Fine Art Boston, the Philadelphia Museum of Art, and the Worcester Art Museum.
