= Gretchen Woodman Rogers =

American painter (1881–1967)

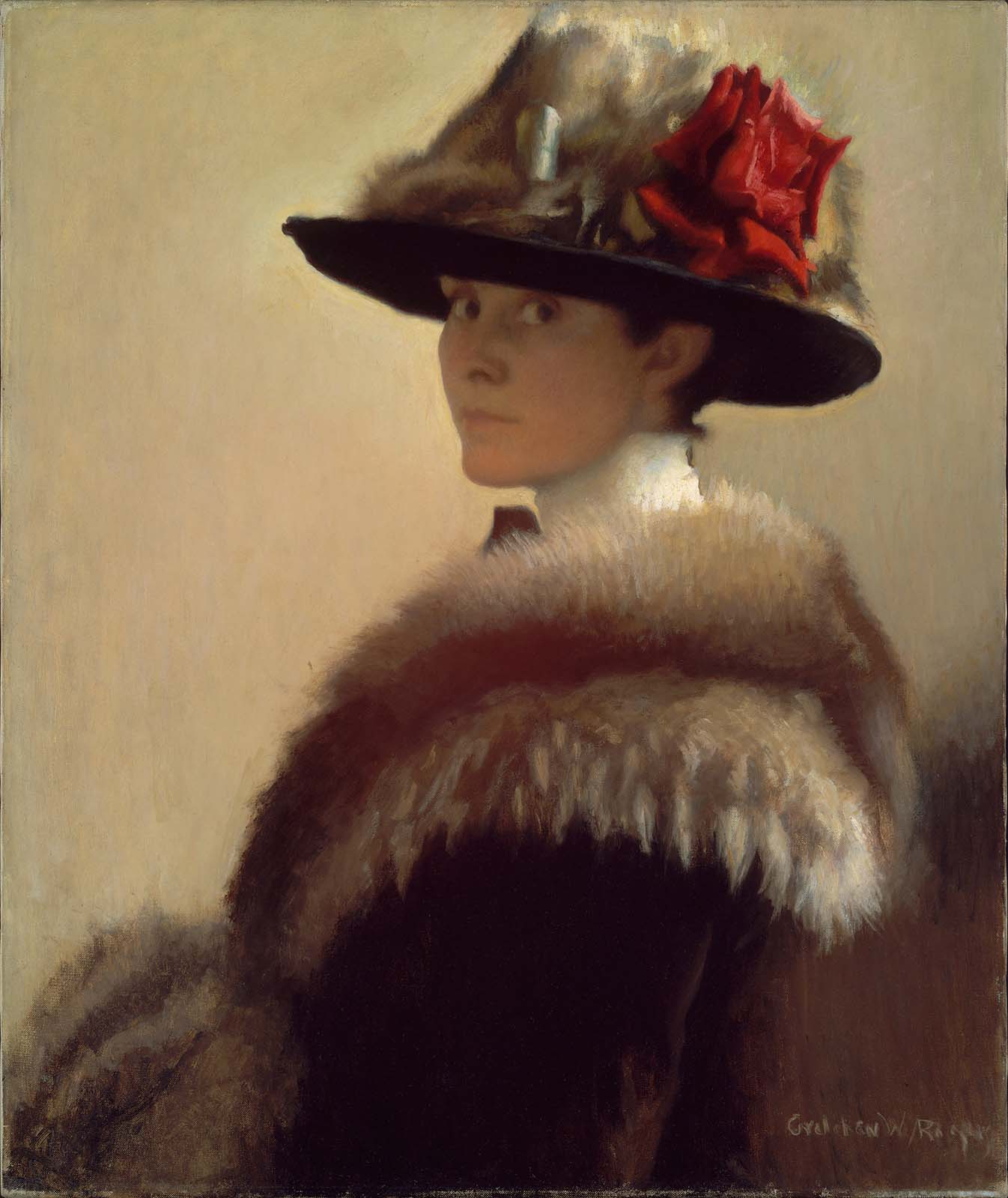
- Woman in a Fur Hat (self-portrait) c. 1915
- Born: 1881; Boston, Massachusetts
- Died: 1967 (aged 85–86); New Haven, Connecticut
- Education: Edmund C. Tarbell
- Known for: Figure and portrait painting
- Movement: Boston School

Gretchen Woodman Rogers (1881–1967) was an American painter associated with the Boston School.

== Life and career ==
Gretchen Woodman Rogers was born in Boston, Massachusetts in 1881. From 1900 to 1907 she studied at the School of the Museum of Fine Arts under Edmund C. Tarbell, winning several awards while still a student. Tarbell once called her "the best pupil I ever had...a genius."

Rogers was a highly regarded painter in her day. She exhibited at the Boston Museum of Fine Arts, the Pennsylvania Academy of the Fine Arts, and the Art Institute of Chicago, and was mentioned frequently in American Art News. She was a founding member of the Guild of Boston Artists.

Her best-known painting is Woman in a Fur Hat, a self-portrait, which won a silver medal at the Panama–Pacific International Exposition in 1915. The painting is part of the permanent collection of the Boston Museum of Fine Arts. In 2001 it was included in an MFA exhibition, A Studio of Her Own: Women Artists in Boston, 1870-1940, and appeared on the cover of the exhibition catalog. In 2014 it was included in Painting Women, a touring exhibition of 34 paintings by women artists. In an interview, curator Erica Hirshler named it as one of her two favorites, noting that it deliberately echoes Jan Vermeer's Girl with a Pearl Earring in its pose, title, and "attention to light and texture".

Although best known for figure and portrait painting, Rogers also painted still lifes and landscapes, and sometimes worked with pastels.

In 1930 Rogers was still exhibiting, grouped with "such well-known artists" as Adelaide Cole Chase, Louis Kronberg, and "Mrs. Philip L. Hale" in The American Magazine of Art. Soon afterwards, unable to support herself as an artist during the Great Depression, she gave up her Back Bay studio and apparently quit painting. Little is known about her later life.

She died in New Haven, Connecticut in 1967.
