= Louis Kronberg =

American painter

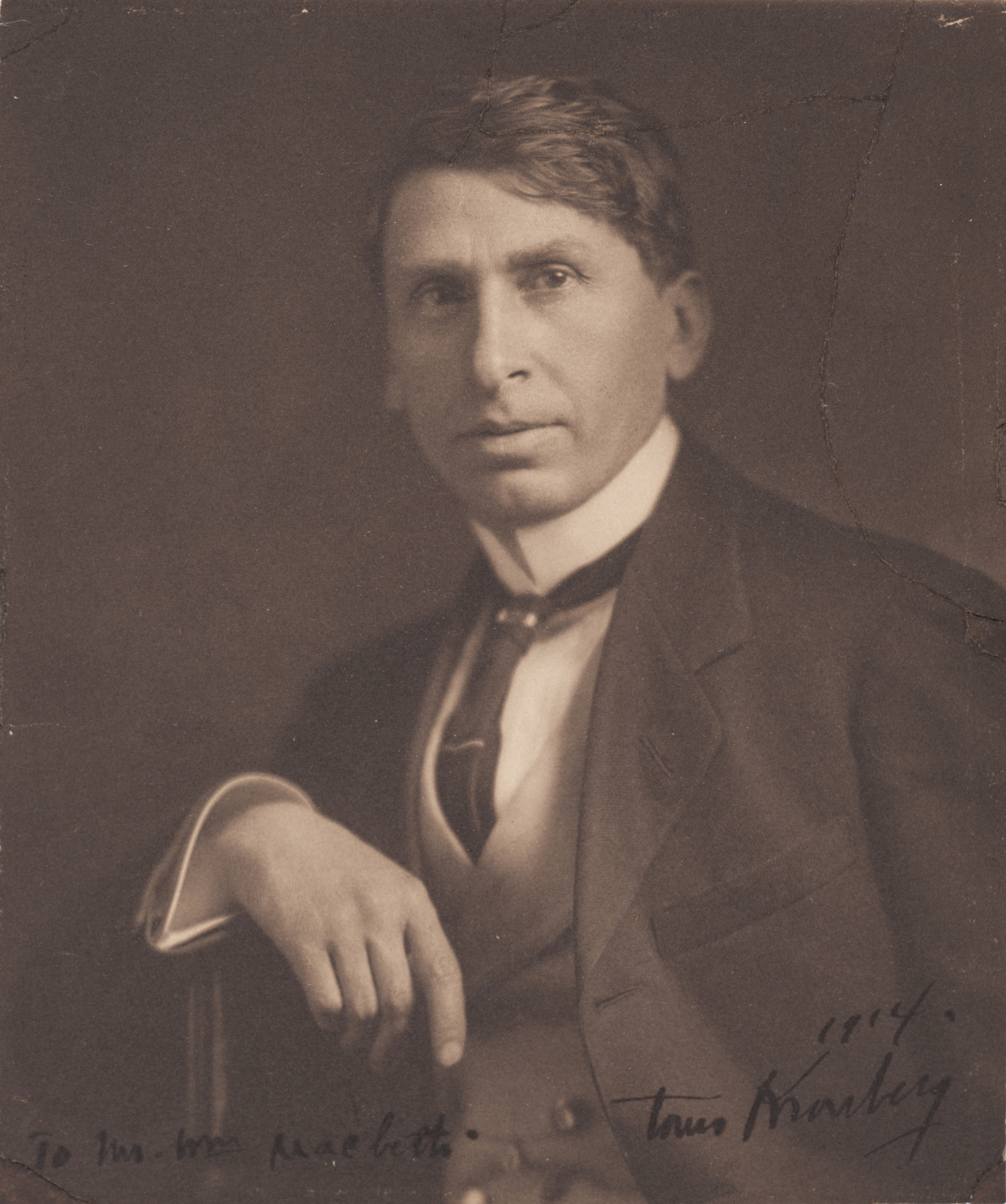
- Louis Kronberg, c. 1914
- Born: December 20, 1872; Boston, Massachusetts, United States
- Died: March 9, 1965 (aged 92); West Palm Beach, Florida, United States
- Education: Boston Museum School; Art Students' League; Académie Julian
- Known for: Painting
- Notable work: Behind the Footlights (Pennsylvania Academy); The Pink Sash (Metropolitan Museum of Art)

Louis Kronberg (1872–1965) was an American figure painter, art dealer, advisor, and teacher. Among his best-known works are Behind the Footlights (Pennsylvania Academy, Philadelphia) and The Pink Sash (Metropolitan Museum, New York).

== Biography ==
Kronberg was born in Boston on December 20, 1872. He studied at the Boston Museum School, under Edmund C. Tarbell and Frank Weston Benson, where he earned a Longfellow Traveling Scholarship. Kronberg also studied at the Art Students' League, New York, and at the Académie Julian (1894–1896) under Jean-Paul Laurens and Jean-Joseph Benjamin-Constant, and privately with Raphaël Collin. In Paris, Kronberg became enamored with the works of Edgar Degas and proficiently painted ballet and Spanish dancers within theatre settings.

Establishing himself in Boston, Kronberg was appointed instructor in the portrait class of Boston's Copley Society of Art. Kronberg was vastly supported by Boston's great art matron Isabella Stewart Gardner, and hence his work is represented in the Isabella Stewart Gardner Museum, as well as in the museums of Boston and Indianapolis. After Bernard Berenson, Kronberg frequently went to Paris to buy art for the Gardner Museum. He lived in Boston until 1919, when he moved to New York City. From 1921–1922 he painted in Algiers and Spain. Later, he lived in Palm Beach, and throughout his career he traveled back and forth to Paris.

Kronberg was an Associate of the American Academy of Arts and Sciences (1935). He was known for his philanthropic efforts and financed painter Arthur Clifton Goodwin's career for over fifteen years.

He died in West Palm Beach, Florida on March 9, 1965.

== Art style ==
Although Kronberg is considered a "Tarbellite" because he trained with Tarbell and Benson, he was highly influenced by the French Impressionists and especially the pastels and oils of ballerinas painted by Degas. His work shows the influence of his French training — his compositions are good and his colors soft and harmonious, yet with decided contrasts. His best work was executed prior to 1915 before he became nearsighted.

== Selected works ==
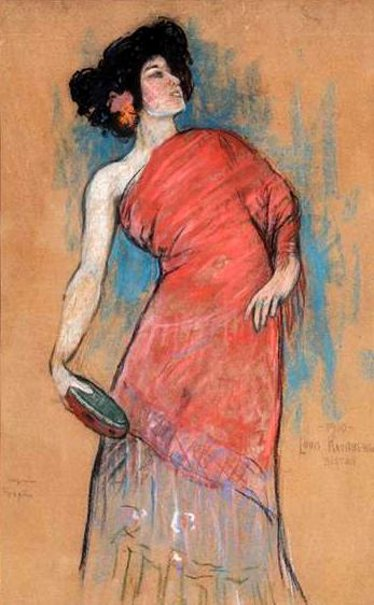
Dancer with tambourine – Eugénie Fougère (1900)

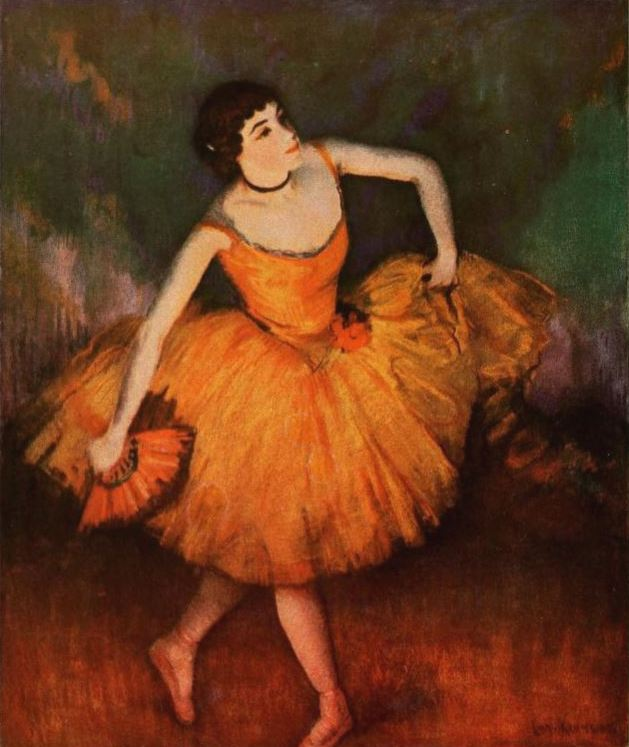
Spanish Dancer (1921)

== Memberships ==
- Boston Art Club
- The Guild of Boston Artists
- Salmagundi Club
- Lotos Club
- Salon des Beaux-Arts, Paris
- Copley Society of Art
- American Water Color Club
- New York Water Color Club
- Rockport Art Association

== Awards ==
- Pan-Pacific Exposition in San Francisco (1915)
- Salmagundi Club (1919)
- International Exposition, Paris (1937)
- Chevalier Legion of Honor, France (1951)

== Represented in permanent collections ==
- Museum of Fine Arts, Boston
- Metropolitan Museum of Art
- Isabella Stewart Gardner Museum, Boston
- Butler Art Institute
- San Diego Museum of Art
- Albright–Knox Art Gallery, Buffalo, NY
- Joslyn Art Museum
- New York Historical Society
- Pennsylvania Academy of the Fine Arts, Philadelphia
- Art Institute of Chicago
- Indianapolis Museum of Art
- Luxembourg Museum (Paris, France)
- Société Nationale (Paris, France)
- Musée d'Orsay (Paris, France)
- La Petite Danseuse at the Zuckerman Museum of Art located at KSU, Marietta Campus
- Whistler House Museum of Art (Lowell, Massachusetts)

== See also ==
- Boston School
