= Charles Henry Turner (painter) =

American painter

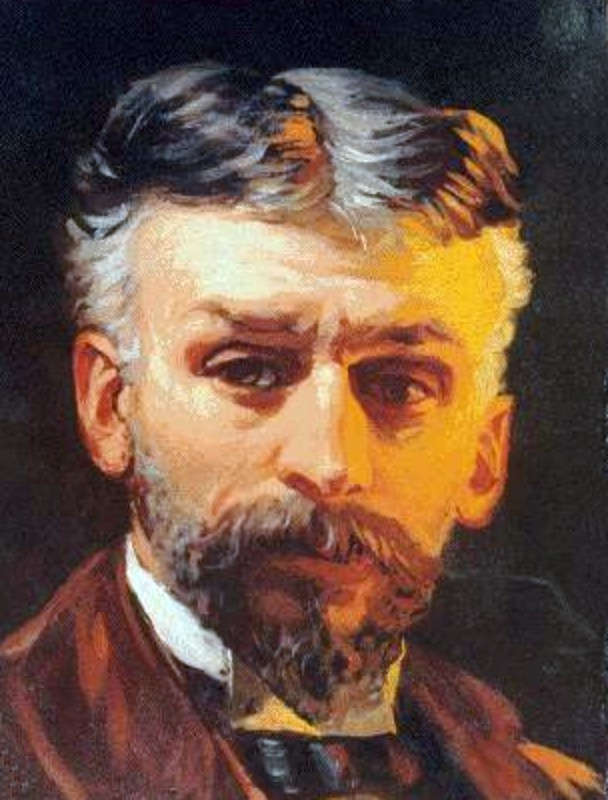
Self-portrait by Turner

Charles Henry Francis Turner (7 August 1848 – 24 November 1908) was an American watercolourist and oil painter of landscapes, portraits, illustrations, and genre scenes, who from 1877 studied with Otto Grundmann (1844–1890), founder of the "Boston School", at the Boston Museum of Fine Arts School. Turner was a member of the Unity Art Club and the Boston Art Club, of which he later became president.

Turner was born in Newburyport, Massachusetts, but lived and worked in Jackson, New Hampshire and Boston, Massachusetts and exhibited in Boston, Philadelphia, and New York.

In the 1880s he spent some time studying and working in Europe, later joining the White Mountain School of painting.

Turner produced some fine, detailed pyrographic artworks. On his trip to the Continent, he was inspired by European and French master paintings and portraits. His love of portrait painting and exposure to early French pyrography, led to his interest in this art form. He created three known pyrographic portraits of European ladies together with a pyrographically decorated oak blanket chest, inscribed on the lid: "This chest decorated in pyrography by me Charles H.F. Turner for my grand daughter Elise 1901".

== Family ==
Charles Henry's father was Henry W. Turner of Boston, and his mother was Sarah A. Goss (b. 28 August 1828 in Hampton, New Hampshire). After his mother's death Charles Henry was raised in Hampton by his mother's parents, William and Theodate Goss.

Charles Henry married Elise Clementina Augusta Hagedorn (b. Stadthagen, Germany) and they had two children, both born in Boston: Gertrude Hagedorn Turner and Charles Mallord Turner.

He died in Boston.
