= Synthetic impressionism =

Style of painting

Synthetic Impressionism is style of painting that combines the carefully observed color and expressive paint handling of impressionist painters with the abstraction of space and multiple exaggerated viewpoints of cubist painters. The forerunners of this style include Van Gogh, Cézanne, and Chaïm Soutine.

Contemporary proponents of this style include the American artists James Michalopoulos and Charles Tersolo.

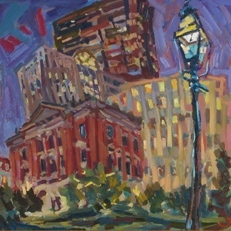
Natural Science, Night (Boston), by Charles Tersolo, 24x30, 2006, Private Collection.
