= Shepler =

Shepler is a surname. Notable people with the surname include:

- Dwight Shepler (1905–1974), American painter and United States Navy officer
- Matthias Shepler (1790–1863), American politician

== See also ==
- Shepler's Ferry, a ferry company of Mackinac Island, Michigan, United States
