= Gertrude Fiske =

American visual artist and painter

- Self portrait, 1922
- Born: April 16, 1879; Boston, Massachusetts, U.S.
- Died: 1961 (aged 81–82); Weston, Massachusetts, U.S.
- Education: Boston Museum School
- Known for: Painting

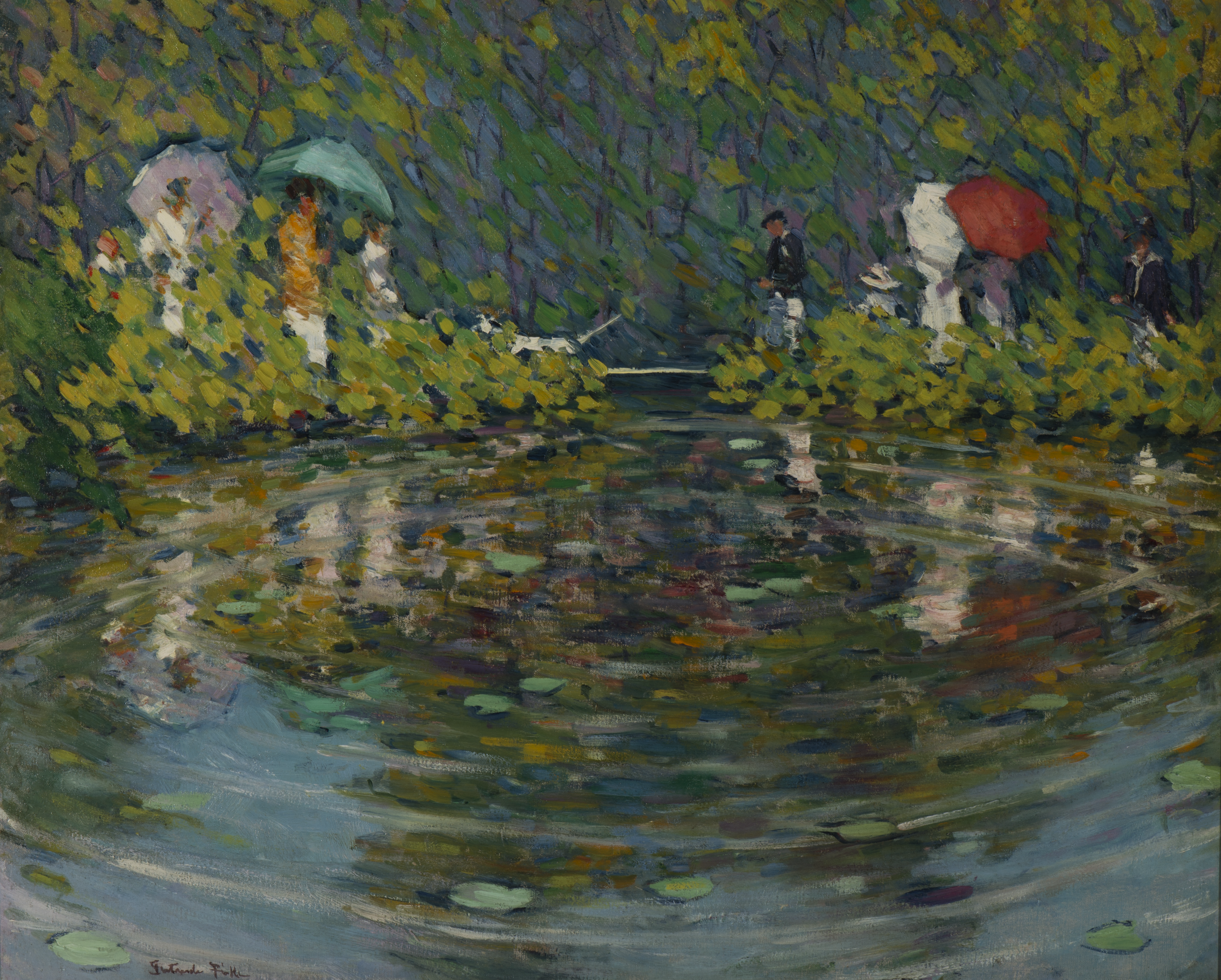
By the Pond, c.1916

Gertrude Horsford Fiske (1879–1961) was an American painter. Fiske was part of the Boston School of painters in the early 20th century. She was the first woman appointed to the Massachusetts State Art Commission in 1929.

Fiske was born in Boston and was the daughter of a prominent local lawyer. Before becoming an artist, she was a successful golfer. Fiske enrolled at the Boston Museum School sometime around 1904 where she studied with Edmund C. Tarbell, Frank Benson and Philip Hale. She also studied with Charles H. Woodbury in Ogunquit, Maine, and incorporated his recommendation to "paint in verbs not in nouns." Her early work was greatly influenced by this aesthetic, but she later moved in other directions. Fiske was a co-founder of the Guild of Boston Artists in 1914 and of the Boston Society of Etchers in 1917. Fiske was a well-established painter by the mid 1920s. In 1928 she was also a co-founder of the Ogunquit Art Association. During the Great Depression, Fiske maintained her full membership in the National Academy of Design. Fiske became a member of the National Association of Women Artists in 1918.

Fiske was known for her strong depictions of women in traditional scenes, such as women in interiors, with power, instead of gentility and fragility. She included both men and women in her compositions, used bold colors, and was well respected for her likeness of male artists. She often portrayed distinctive New England characters (including florists, craftsmen, postmen, fishermen and clerics), in a style popular throughout the 1920s. Fiske also painted landscapes, including of Revere Beach, a stone quarry in Weston, Massachusetts, and the Navy Yard in Portsmouth, New Hampshire. Later works included the introduction and adoption of modern technologies such as the telephone and automobile. Selected compositions include The Window (1916), The Carpenter (c. 1922), Sunday Afternoon (c. 1925), and Jade (c. 1930). Her sense of composition was considered "harmonious" and "warm." The Carpenter won the Thomas B. Clarke prize from the National Academy of Design.

Fiske's works have been exhibited at the Pennsylvania Academy of the Fine Arts, the Art Institute of Chicago, the National Academy of Design, the Corcoran Gallery, Cleveland Museum of Art, the Farnsworth Museum, the Rhode Island School of Design, and the Guild of Boston Artists. Prizes include the Shaw prize for women artists (twice), the best figure composition (twice), the Proctor prize for portraiture from the National Academy of Design.

The artwork of Gertrude Fiske was the subject of the exhibition Gertrude Fiske: American Master, April to September 2018 at Discover Portsmouth, Portsmouth, New Hampshire. The show was organized by the Portsmouth Historical Society and curated by Lainey McCartney. Fiske, says McCartney, "challenged established stereotypes for women with her extraordinary talent, dignity, and work ethic. Painting during a time when conservative traditions and social roles were firmly set for women, Fiske forged her own path."

Fiske died in 1961 in Weston, Massachusetts.
