= John Joseph Enneking =

American artist (1841–1916)

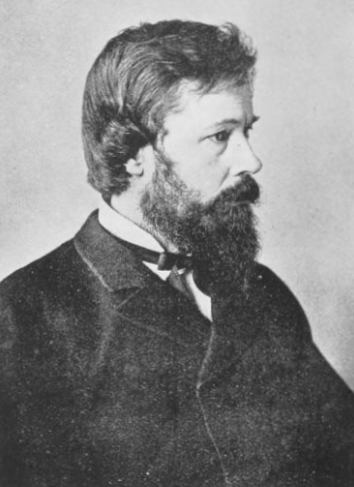
- Born: October 4, 1841; Minster, Ohio
- Died: November 16, 1916 (aged 75); Boston, Massachusetts
- Occupation: Painter

Signature
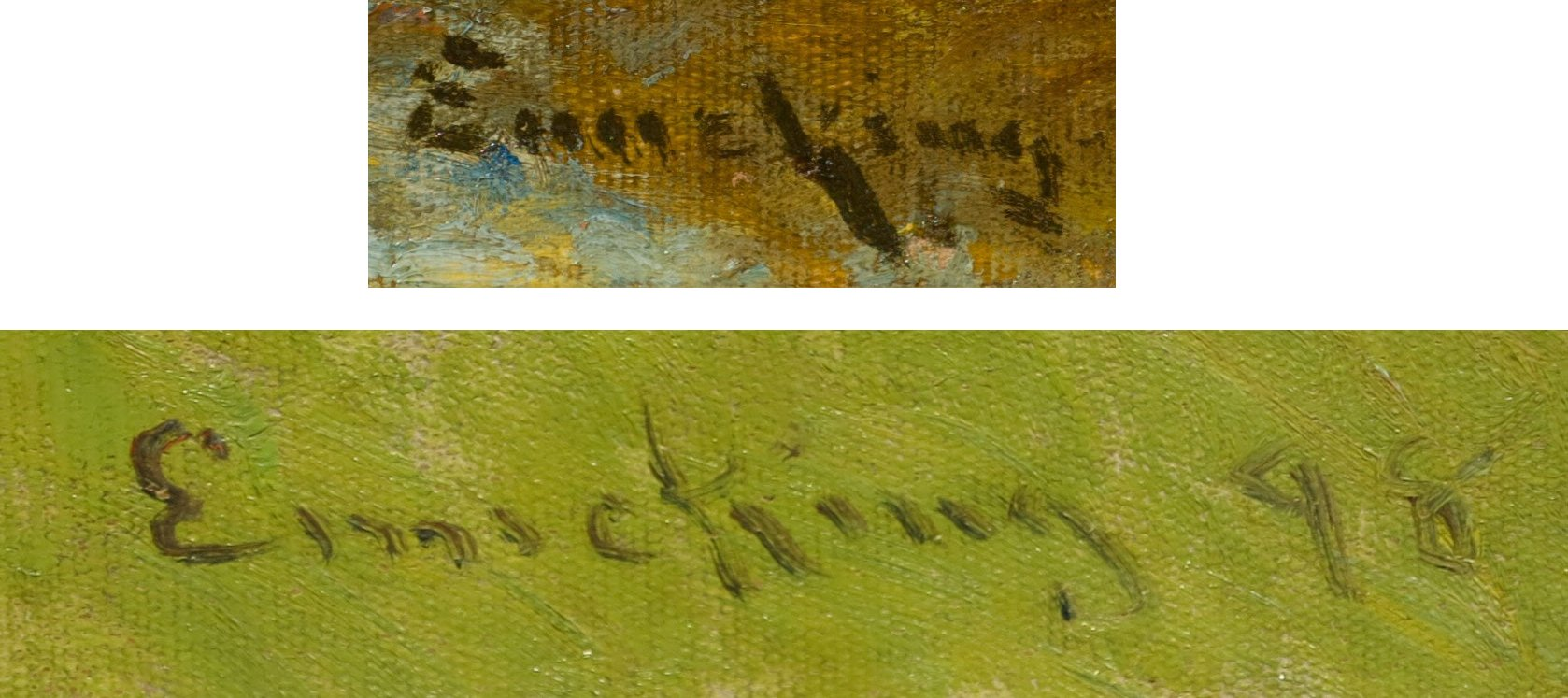

John Joseph Enneking (October 4, 1841 – November 16, 1916) was an American Impressionist painter associated with the Boston School.

== Biography ==
Enneking was born of German ancestry in Minster, Ohio. He was educated at Mount St. Mary's College, Cincinnati, served in the American Civil War in 1861–1862, studied art in New York and Boston, and gave it up because his eyes were weak, only to return to it after failing in the manufacture of tinware.

From 1873 to 1876 he studied in Munich under Schleich and Leier, and in Paris under Daubigny and Bonnat; and in 1878-1879 he studied in Paris again and sketched in the Netherlands. Enneking is a plein air painter, and his favorite subject is the November twilight of New England, and more generally the half lights of early spring, late autumn, and winter dawn and evening.

In the year before his death, a dinner was given in his honor at the Copley Plaza Hotel in Boston. Over 1,000 people attended the 1915 event and Enneking was crowned with the victor's laurel wreath by the prominent sculptor Cyrus Dallin.

Enneking died at Boston in 1916. Shortly after his death, memorial exhibitions of his work were held at the Boston Art Club and in Portland, Maine. These were followed a decade later by two exhibitions at the Vose Galleries of Boston in 1922 and 1926. His family placed the bulk of his work in storage in an old warehouse in Boston's Back Bay neighborhood. After the death of his wife Mary Katharine Elliott Enneking (November 2, 1844 – October 23, 1923), the paintings were forgotten. The paintings were rediscovered in the late 1950s as the warehouse was being torn down. The Vose Galleries in Boston were again involved in promoting his work, and in 1972, in the publication of Enneking's biography.

The Enneking Parkway in Hyde Park, Massachusetts is named after Enneking.

== Gallery ==
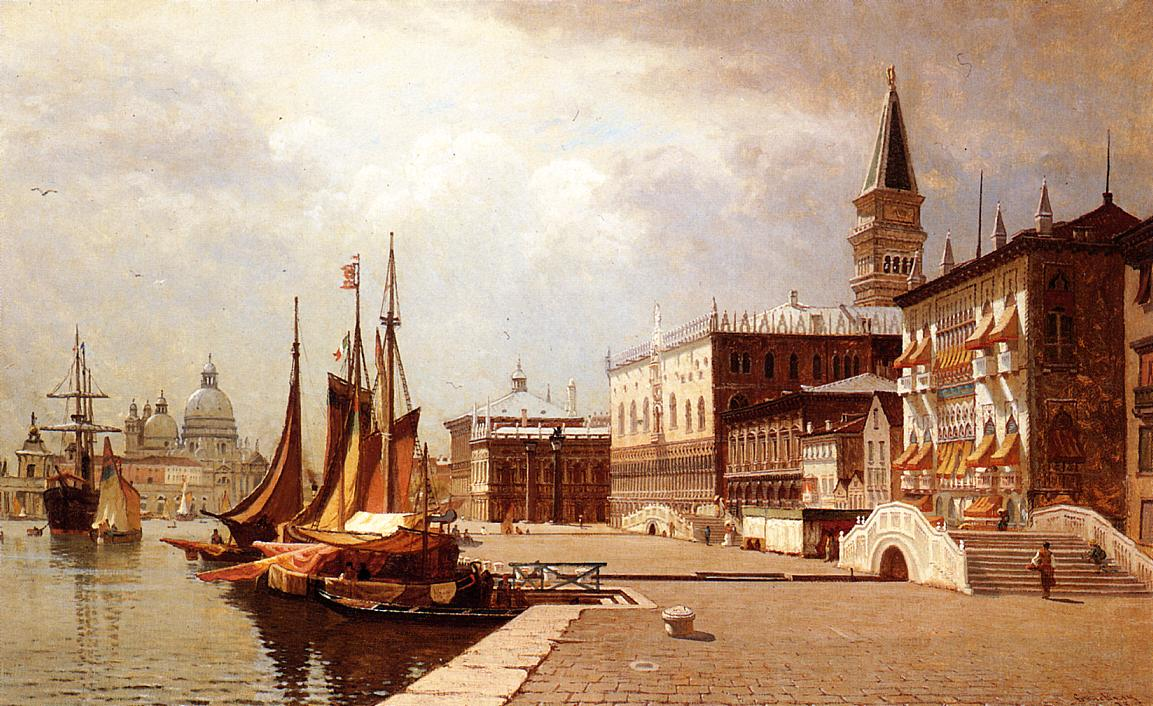
Venice at Midday

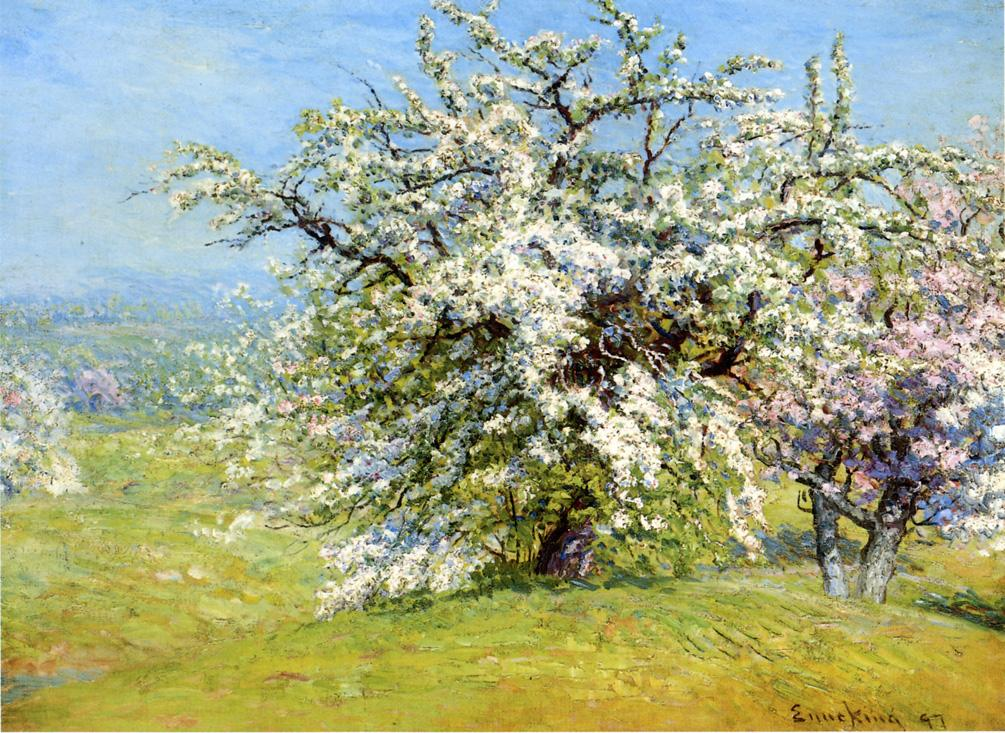
Blooming Meadows

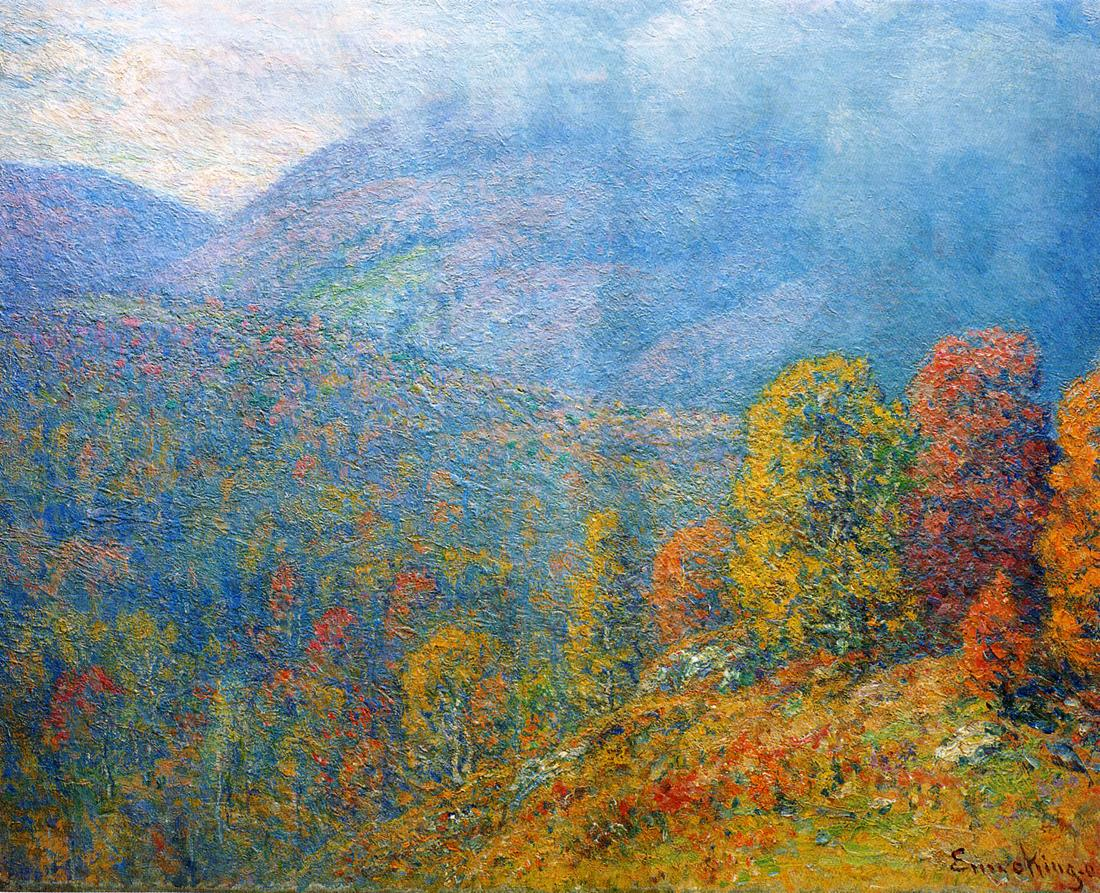
Mountain Landscape
