= Copley Society of Art =

American non-profit art association

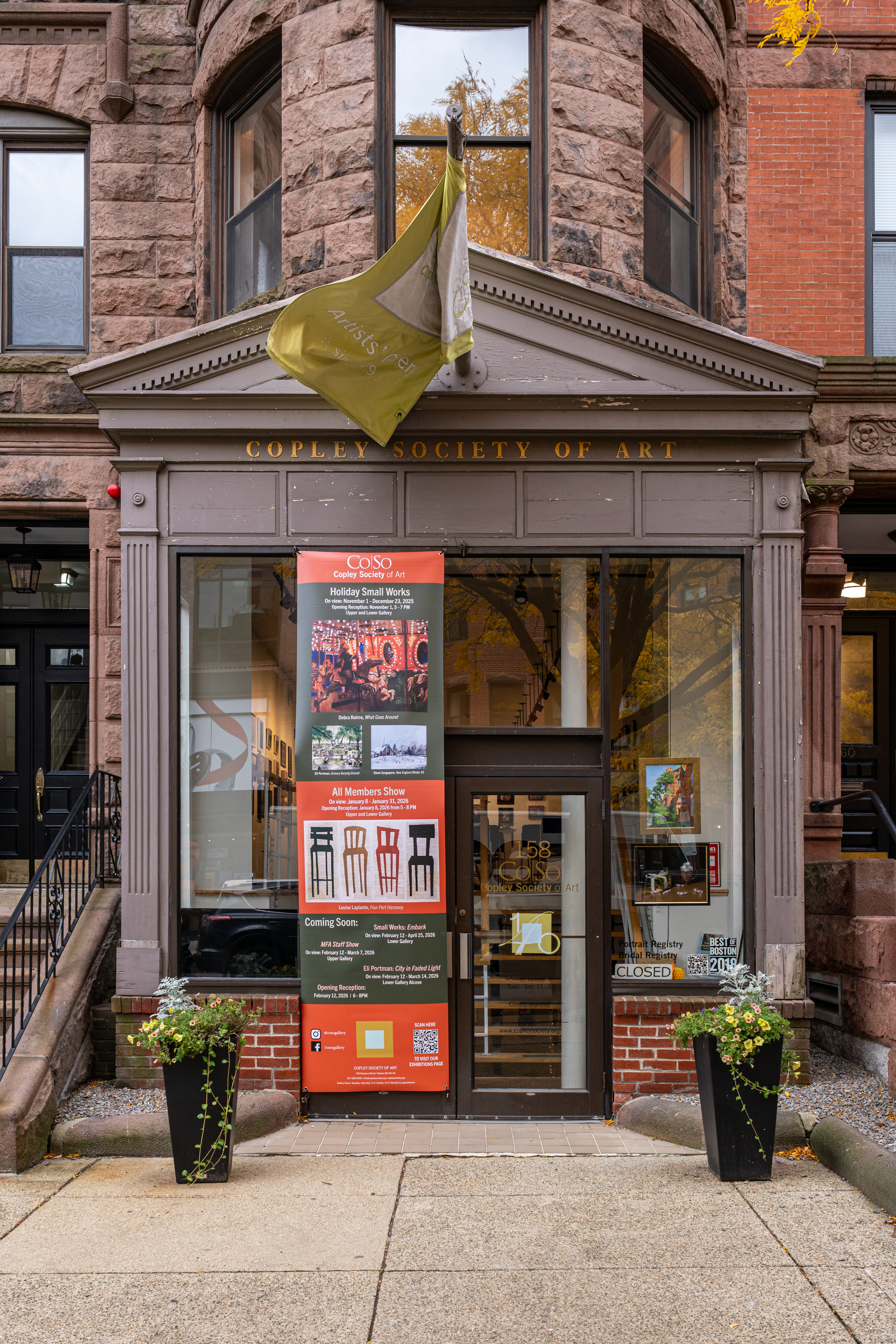
- Established: 1879
- Location: 158 Newbury Street, Boston, Massachusetts 02116
- Website: www.copleysociety.org

The Copley Society of Art is the oldest non-profit art association in the United States. It was founded in 1879 by the first graduating class of the School of the Museum of Fine Arts and continues to play an important role in promoting its member artists and the visual arts in Boston. The Society is named after John Singleton Copley.

The gallery currently represents over 400 living artist members, ranging in experience from students to nationally recognized artists and in style, from traditional and academic realists, to contemporary and abstract painters, photographers, sculptors, and printmakers.

Several of the artists working in the tradition of the Boston School of painters exhibit at the Copley Society of Art, along with the Guild Of Boston Artists a few doors down from the Copley Society of Art's Newbury Street location.

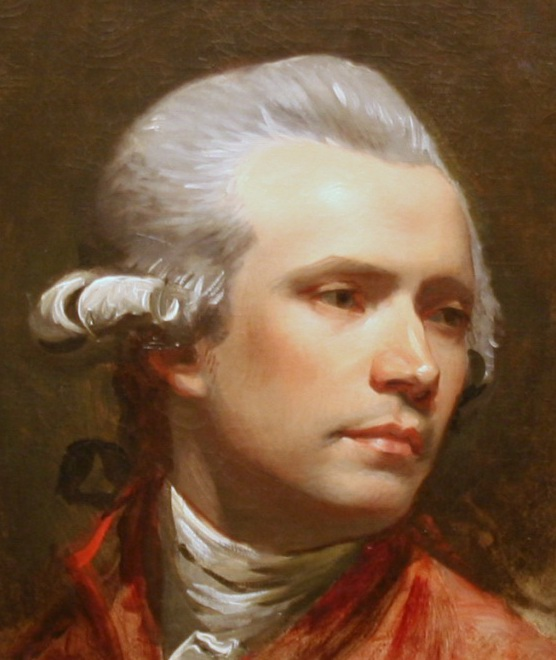
John Singleton Copley, Self-portrait, 1780–1784, Oil on canvas

The gallery hosts between 15 and 20 exhibitions each year, including solo exhibitions, thematic group shows, juried competitions, and fundraising events.

The most well known of these events is the annual "Fresh Paint" auction. Several artist members are chosen by the gallery to spend one day together painting outside in the city. The paintings are brought back to the gallery while still wet, placed directly into frames and mounted on the walls for sale through silent auction. In the final night of the week-long event, a few selected pieces are included in a live auction. Although the usual commission split for the gallery is 60 percent to the artist and 40 percent to the Copley Society, the event requires artists donate 50 percent of the sale, and encouraged to donate up to 100 percent of the selling price to the non-profit organization.

The Copley Society has helped establish the careers of many of Boston's prominent full-time professional fine artists.

== Notable artists ==
- Rick Fleury
- Annie Hurlburt Jackson
- Candace Whittemore Lovely
- Dianne Panarelli-Miller
- Sergio Roffo
- Janis Saunders
- Charles Tersolo
- Sam Vokey
- Wheeler Williams
- John Wilson (sculptor) - Instructor
- Mikel Wintermantel

== See also ==
- Grundmann Studios, home of the society 1893-1917
