= Marcia Oakes Woodbury =

American painter

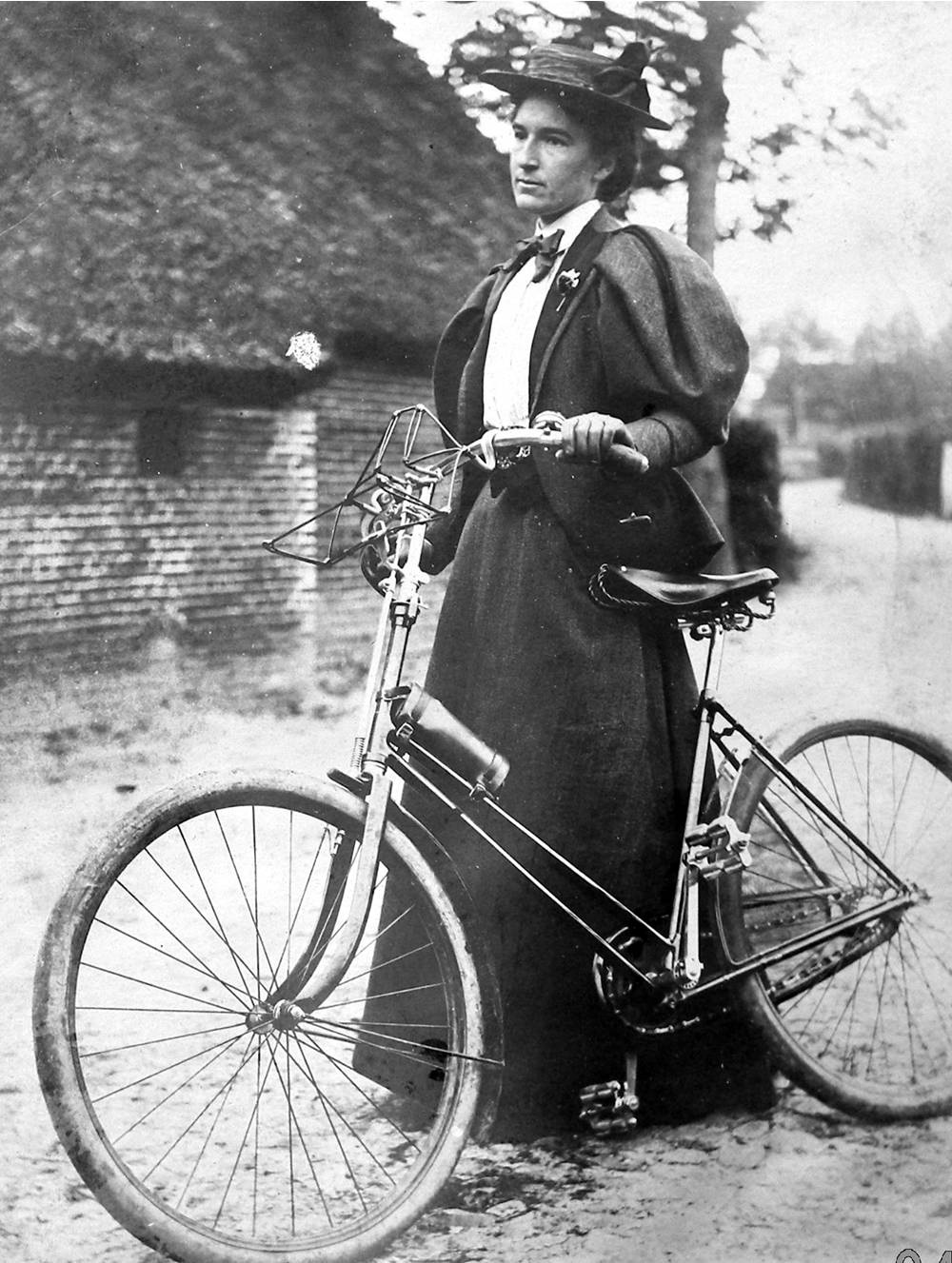
- Oakes Woodbury in 1894
- Born: Susan Marcia Oakes; June 20, 1865; South Berwick, Maine, United States
- Died: November 7, 1913 (aged 48); Ogunquit, Maine, United States
- Education: Berwick Academy
- Occupation: Painter
- Spouse: Charles Herbert Woodbury (m. 1890)

Marcia Oakes Woodbury (June 20, 1865 – November 7, 1913) was an American painter.

== Early life and education ==
Woodbury was born on June 20, 1865, in South Berwick, Maine, United States. She was the first daughter born to schoolteacher Susan Marcia Bennett Oakes, who would inspire her to create Moeder en dochter.

After graduating from Berwick Academy, she took painting lessons from Charles Herbert Woodbury, whom she later married in 1890. The couple went to Holland on their honeymoon and lived there for a few years.

== Career ==
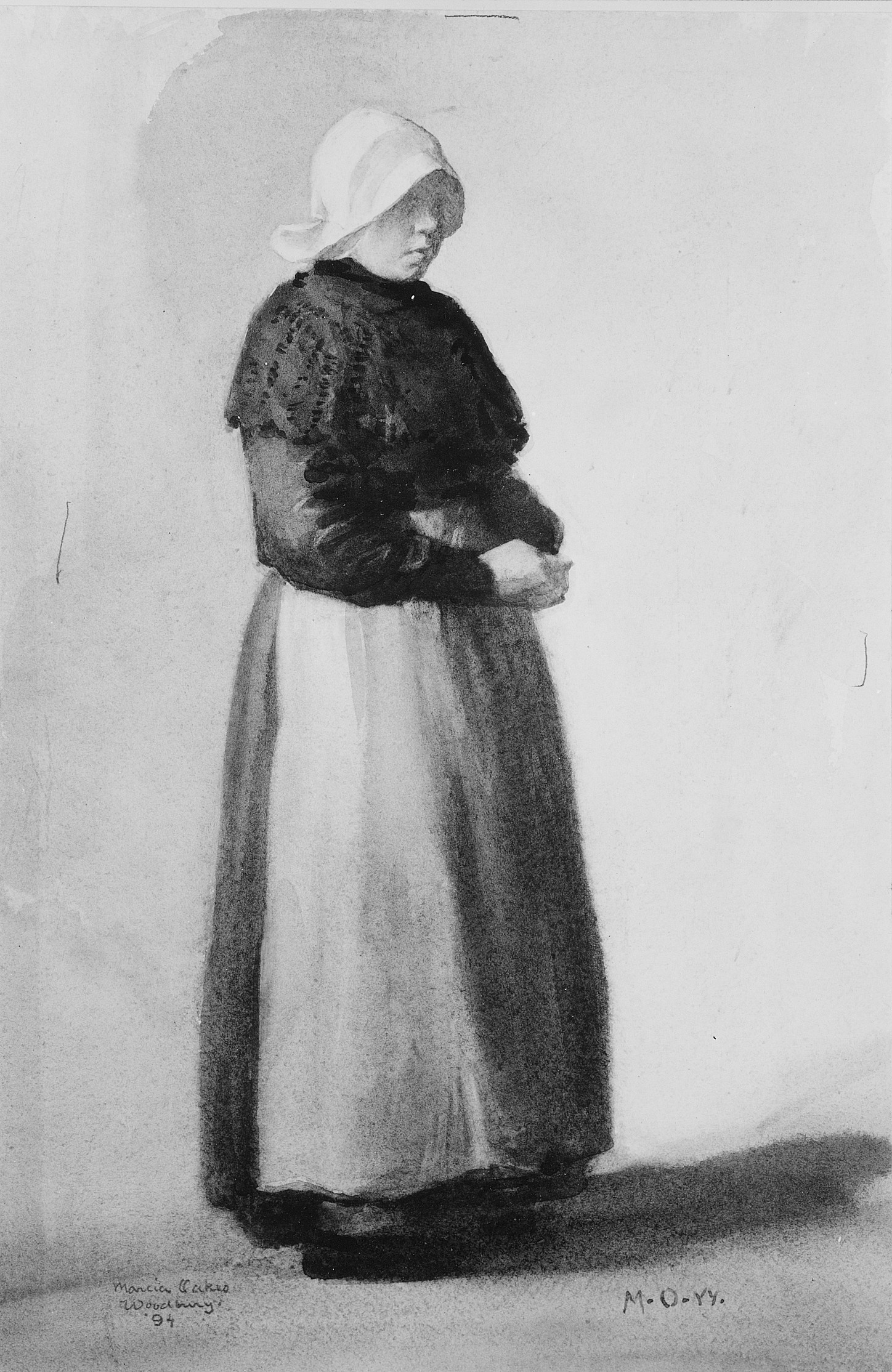
Woodbury's painting "Dutch Woman" is held by the Metropolitan Museum of Art

While living in Holland, Woodbury painted everyday scenes of Dutch children and their lifestyles. Her paintings are described as depicting "Dutch innocence and simplicity in home-made, clumsy attire." While journeying through Europe, Woodbury picked up the Dutch language so she could "develop personal relationships with her models, their families, and the local community." At the 1895 Atlanta Exposition she earned a gold medal for her art, and later earned more medals at both the Massachusetts Charitable Mechanic Association and Boston Art Club.

Woodbury developed a close friendship with Sarah Orne Jewett and she completed illustrations alongside her husband for Jewett's books Deephaven and The Tory Lover. Her watercolor painting Dutch Woman is held by the Metropolitan Museum of Art. After her death, 40 of Woodbury's drawings and water colors and oil paintings were put on display at the Museum of Fine Arts, Boston.
