= Hermann Dudley Murphy =

American painter

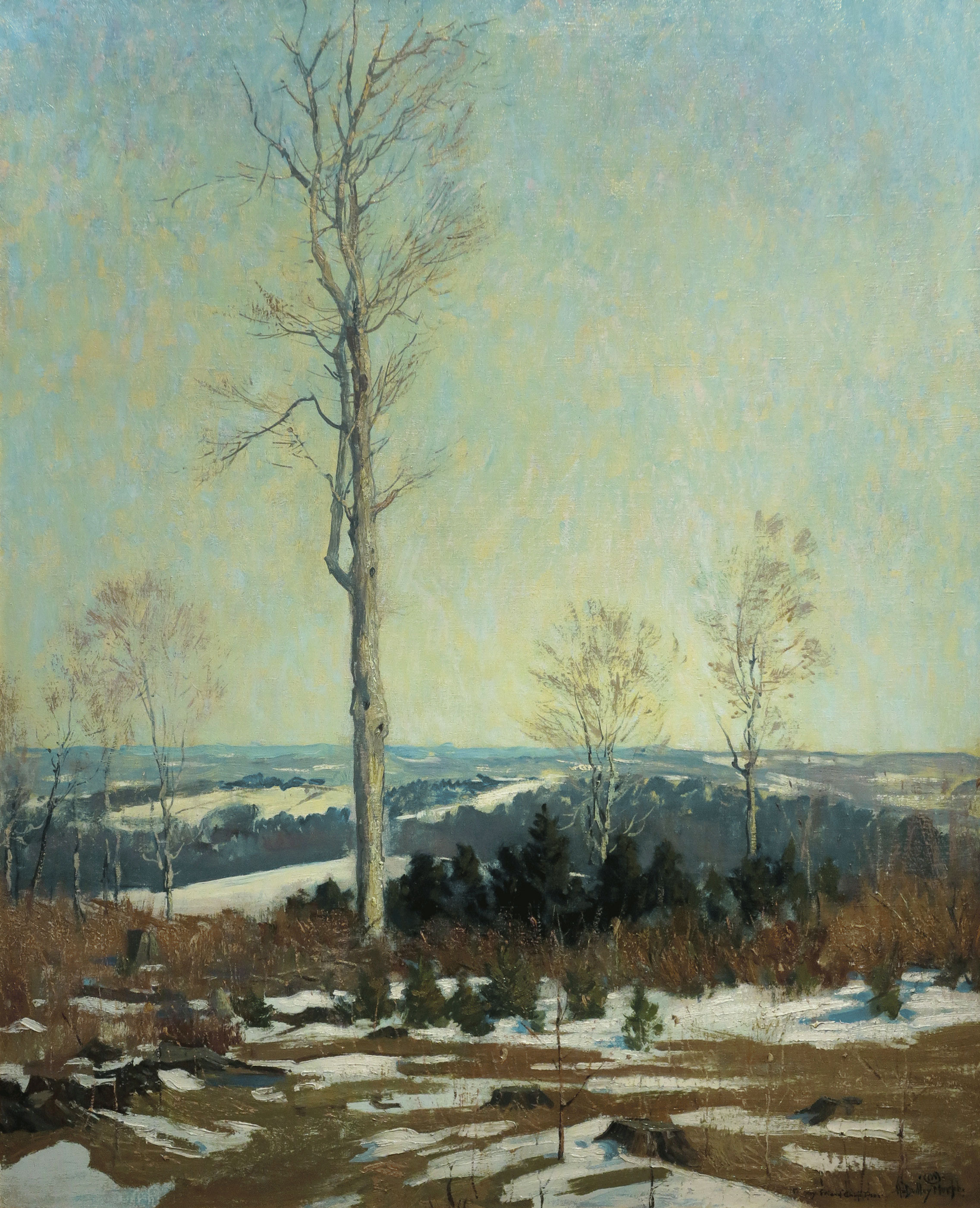
March Landscape near Mount Monadnock

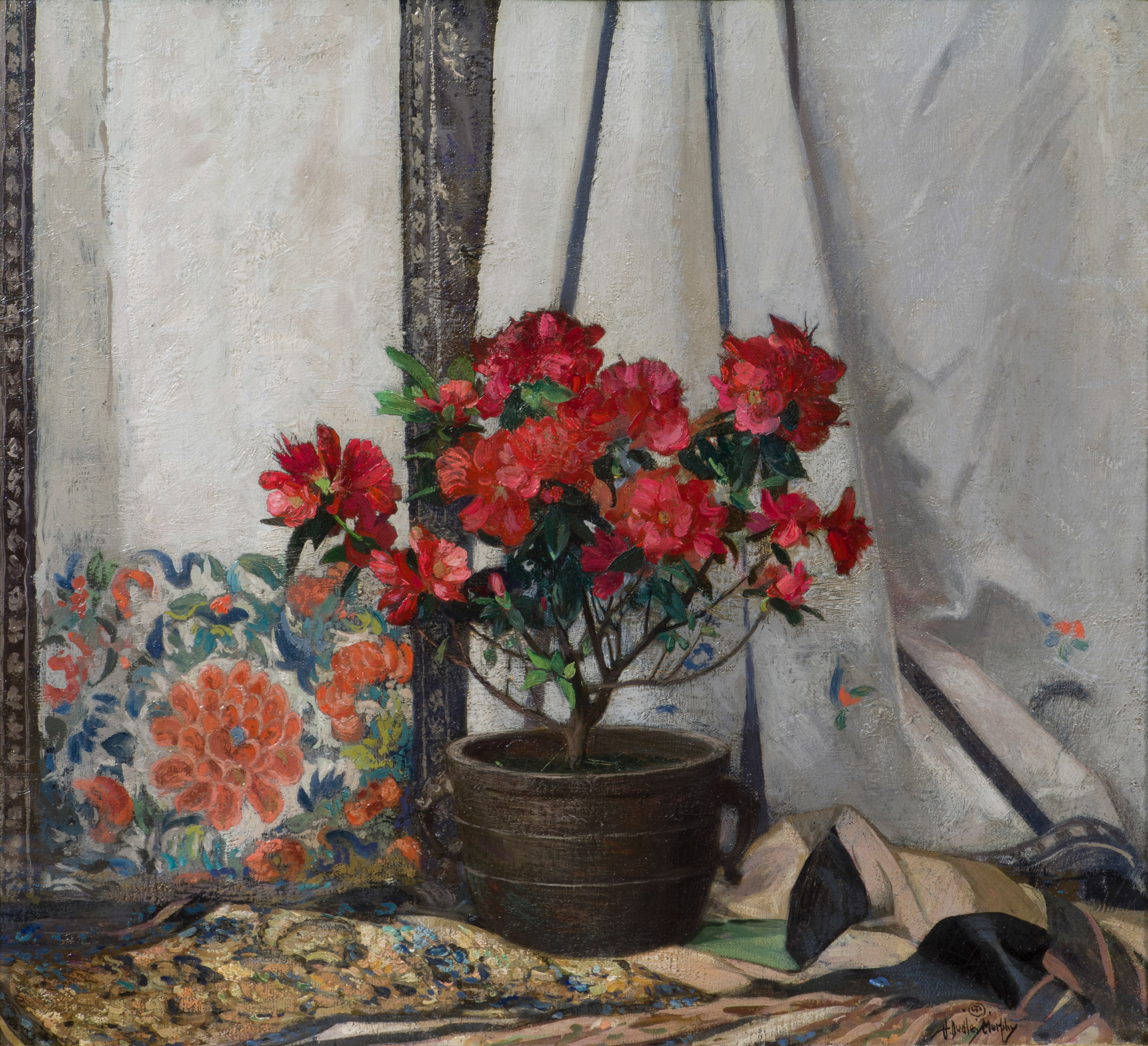
The Azalea

Hermann Dudley Murphy (25 August 1867, Marlborough, Massachusetts - 1945, Lexington, Massachusetts) was an American painter, known mostly for still-lifes and landscapes. He also worked as an illustrator, art teacher and frame designer.

== Biography ==
His father was an Irish-born shoe manufacturer and his mother was from an old New Hampshire family. He had his primary education at the Chauncy Hall school in Boston then, in 1886, enrolled at the Boston Museum School, where he studied with Emil Otto Grundmann, Joseph DeCamp and Edmund C. Tarbell, who had the most influence on his style. In the following years he would, in fact, be counted among the "Tarbellites".

For a time, he worked as an illustrator. This included a commission to accompany the Nicaraguan Canal Expedition from 1887 to 1888.

He moved to Paris in 1891, where he studied at the Académie Julian with Benjamin-Constant and Jean-Paul Laurens. He would live there for five years. During his stay he was introduced to the work of James McNeill Whistler and absorbed elements of the Aesthetic style. He exhibited some portraits at the Salon in 1895. Two years later, he and his wife Caroline Bowles, returned to the United States and settled in Winchester, Massachusetts.

In 1903, he and Charles Prendergast opened the "Carrig-Rohane" (Red Cliff) frame shop in Winchester. It was named after the Irish town where Murphy's father was born. In 1903 he taught frame-making at the Arts and Crafts-oriented Byrdcliffe Colony in Woodstock, NY, where he also created a set of doors painted with landscape for a Byrdcliffe chest. By 1905, Murphy and Prendergast's enterprise was successful enough that it relocated to Boston. In 1912 the Swedish woodcarver, Walfred Thulin (1878–1949) became a member of the company. By 1915, the level of business had grown to the point where he asked his friend, the art dealer Robert Vose (1873–1964), to take over its day-to-day management. It remained in operation until 1939.

Murphy exhibited at the Armory Show but, by 1928, had given up modernism. The Boston Sunday Post quotes him as saying; "These Modernist painters say that they paint not what they see, but what they feel--well, Heaven help them if they feel like what they paint!"

In 1930, he became an Associate of the National Academy of Design and was named an Academician in 1934. He was also a member of the Boston Art Club and the Copley Society, among several others. From 1931 to 1937, he taught in the Art Department at Harvard University. In his later years, he concentrated on floral still lifes. He and his wife were also avid canoeists and travelled extensively in Central America and the Caribbean. His works are displayed at museums throughout the United States.
