= Alice Ruggles Sohier =

American painter (1880–1969)

- Born: Alice Ruggles; 1880
- Died: 1969 (aged 88–89); Concord, Massachusetts, US
- Other name: Alice Sohier
- Education: Art Students' League of Buffalo, School of the Museum of Fine Arts, Boston
- Occupation: Painter
- Spouse: Louis Amory Sohier

Alice Ruggles Sohier (1880–1969) was an American artist, known for paintings of figures, portraits, still lifes, and landscapes. She was an active artist between 1900 until around c.1959.

== Life ==
Alice Ruggles was born in 1880. The daughter of Frederick Huntington and Ruth Alice Swan, raised in the Dorchester neighborhood of Boston. She graduated high school in 1899. From 1900 until 1902, Sohier attended Art Students League of Buffalo, studying under Lucius Wolcott Hitchcock.

In 1904, she studied at the School of the Museum of Fine Arts (Museum School), with Edmund C. Tarbell and Frank Weston Benson. In 1907, she was awarded the Paige Traveling Scholarship, allowing her two years to travel throughout Europe.

In 1913, she married engineer, Louis Amory Sohier of Concord. The couple moved first to Pennsylvania then later to Concord, Massachusetts. She taught art classes at Concord Academy. She was an early member of The Guild of Boston Artists.

She died in May 1969 in Concord, Massachusetts.

Her work is included in many public museum collections, including Museum of Fine Arts, Boston, Butler Institute of American Art, Zanesville Museum of Art, Frick Art Reference Library, among others.
