= Candace Whittemore Lovely =

American impressionist painter (born 1953)

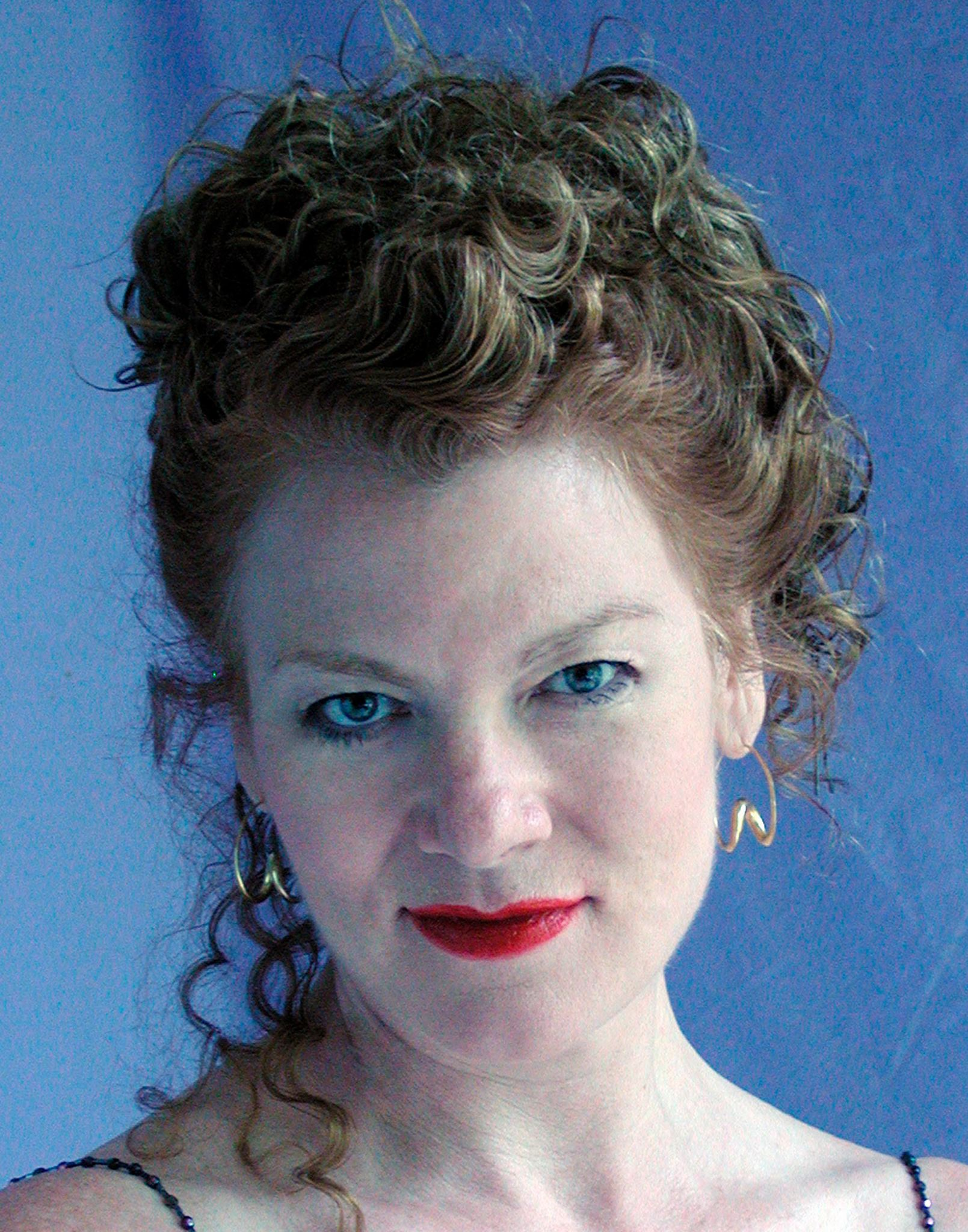
- Born: March 15, 1953; Vermont, United States of America
- Education: University of Vermont
- Notable work: Arlington Street Showers, Playing with Fire, Good and Lovely Kiss
- Style: American Impressionism
- Website: candacelovely.com

Candace Whittemore Lovely (born March 15, 1953) is an American impressionist painter known for her paintings of contemporary American life, including landscapes of treasured locales and people at play in idyllic locations. She lives and works in Hilton Head Island, South Carolina.

In 1991, Lovely painted the official portrait of former First Lady Barbara Bush. She has been called "the grand dame of Boston painters".

== Early life and education ==
Lovely was born in Vermont, her mother an artist and her father an engineer. She had four siblings, all brothers. Her interest in art began at age four when a toy nursing kit lost its novelty. Her mother did not replace the candy pills that came with the kit, but did replace her crayons. Growing up, there were always craft supplies around the house and a sense that making was better than buying.

Lovely's father attended both Dartmouth and MIT and her grandfathers attended the University of Vermont and Harvard. Despite struggling with dyslexia, she attended college at the University of Vermont, where she was drawn to the world of American Impressionism after a professor discussed Winslow Homer and announced that "no one is taught how to paint anymore". She graduated from the university with a bachelor's degree in art and a fifth-year teaching certificate. In 1980, she began studying at The Boston School with master artists including Robert Cormier and Paul Ingbretson at Fenway Studios.

Lovely lives and works in Hilton Head Island, South Carolina.

== Classification ==
Among authorities in the art world, Lovely's work is labeled as Contemporary American Impressionism. She claims that learning to combine Neoclassicism with Impressionism at the Boston School forced her to base her work on quality drawing, sensitivity to value, and finally adding the gently abstracted feel of impressionism.

== Work ==
Lovely's work is done on a variety of subject matter including Boston, ballet, beach scenes, the Lowcountry, Kennebunkport, Nantucket, Martha's Vineyard, Vermont, and much more. Playing with Fire continues to be one of her most popular paintings, depicting a boy lighting sparks on the beach, the ocean just feet away. Arlington Street Showers is one of her best-selling works, which shows a rainy, recognizable Boston streetscape. The colors in Arlington Street Showers are a bit darker than most of Lovely's work, which may account for the painting's standing out from the crowd.

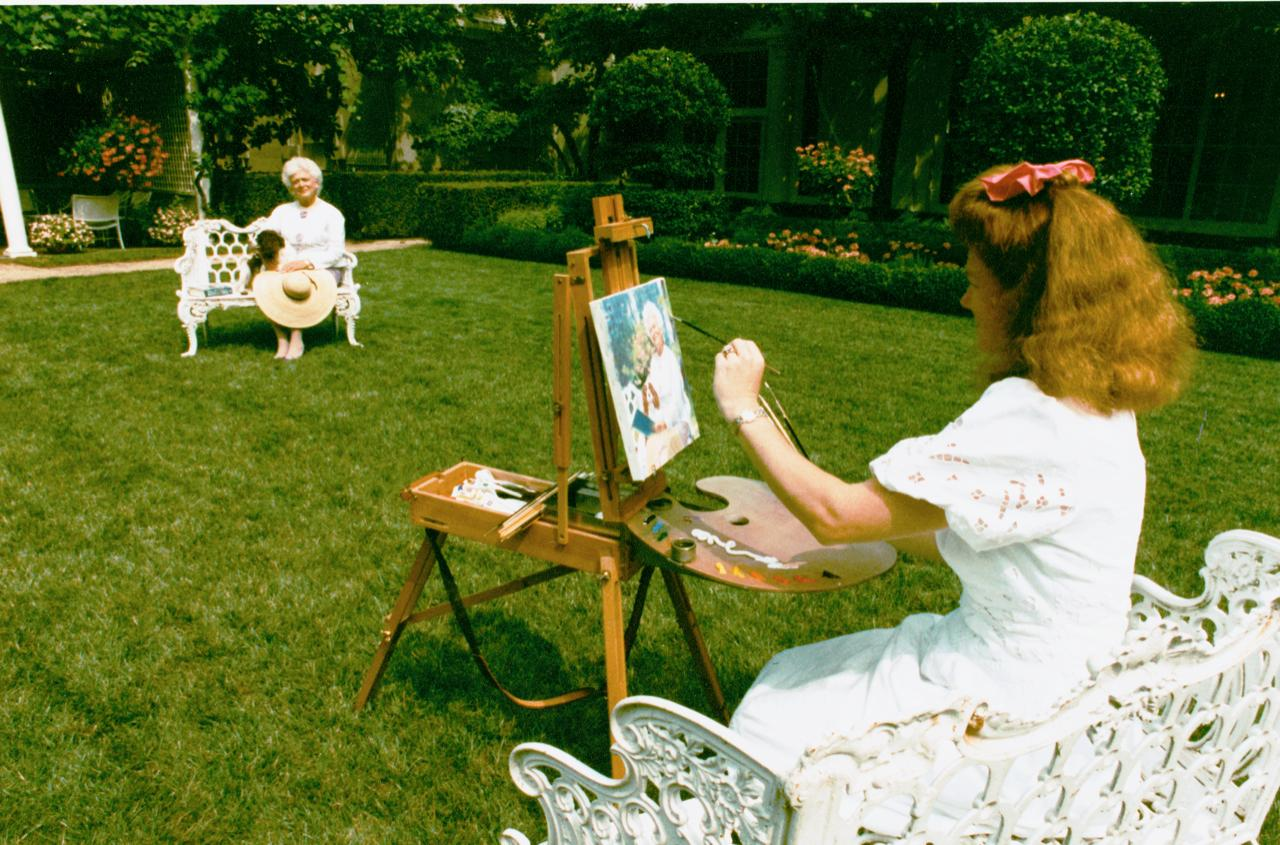
Candace Lovely and Barbara Bush in the Jacqueline Kennedy Garden

=== Portrait of Barbara Bush ===
In the summer of 1991, Candace was invited to paint the portrait of First Lady Barbara Bush. While painting commissioned portraits of children in Kennebunkport, Maine, Candace reached out to the Bush family, who also had a home in Kennebunkport, about the possibility of painting their grandchildren. Mrs. Bush responded and Candace was invited to the White House for five days in the summer of 1991. Unable to choose which of her grandchildren to include in the portrait, Mrs. Bush decided, "I want my pearls and Millie in the painting," with Millie being the Bushes' pet English Springer Spaniel. Candace and Mrs. Bush would exchange notes for years thereafter.

=== Political ===
The most controversial of her political pieces is Good and Lovely Kiss, which is Lovely's version of the Confederate flag. The piece can be shocking whether because this flag is viewed as a symbol of slavery or as a symbol of Southern love. When asked if her flags still represent love and joy, like she notes all of her paintings to do, she said, "But it still turned out pink. It's nectar and peaches and sweet honey. It's the good things of the South," and “If we can think of these symbols as hugs and kisses, dress them in candy colors, then they become far gentler."

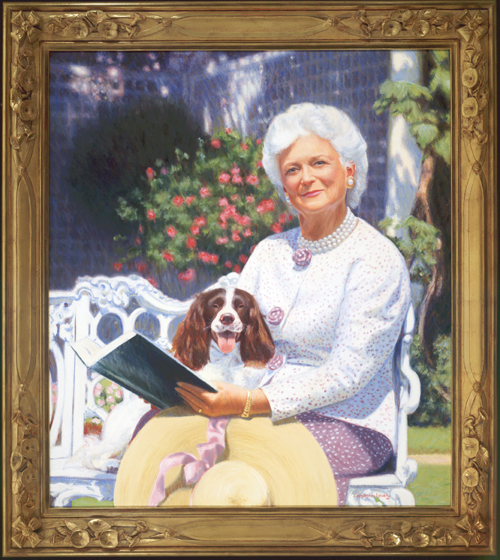
Companions in the Garden, 1991

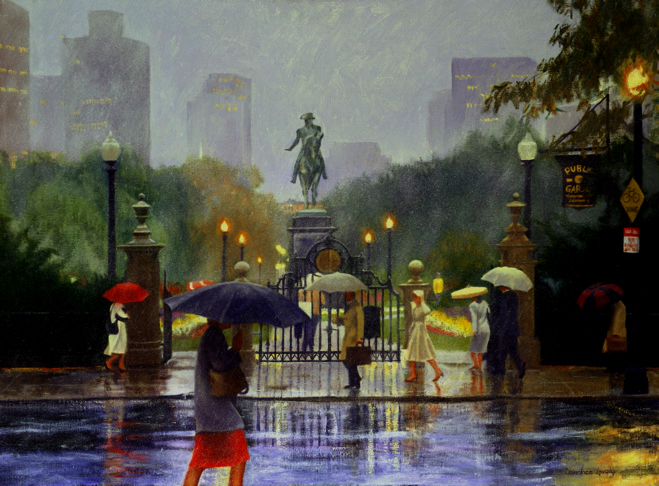
Arlington Street Showers, September 1983, Oil on Linen, 26x35in

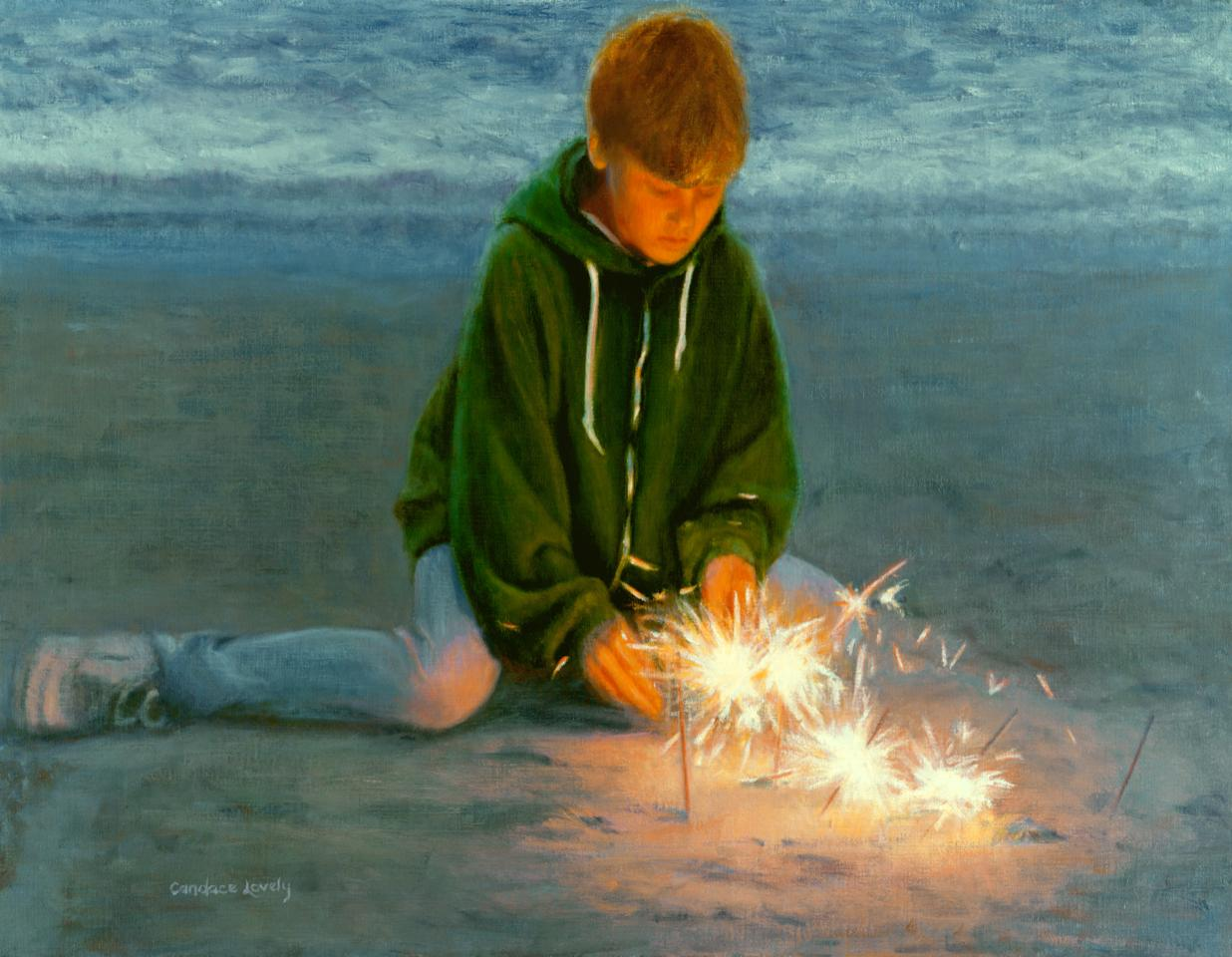
Playing with Fire, 1987, Oil on Linen, 35x27in

== Evaluation and influence ==
Christopher A. Faris told the Manchester Journal in 2005, "Candace Whittemore Lovely's oil paintings are exquisitely, touchingly, and masterfully executed and simply should not be missed by any lover of great art."

Lovely received strong criticism from locals for displaying publicly a piece depicting a naked woman dancing on a table in front of several men. In a letter to the local paper, a concerned citizen wrote, "Shocked that a public library would blatantly display such pornographic and degrading material, I spoke to a librarian, who ... defended this 'view of society.'" The citizen also noted that by placing this painting in a public library, innocent children are encouraged that it is normal and acceptable.

== Recognition ==
Lovely received the Copley Master Award in 1988 from The Copley Society of Boston. Other awards include a Woman in the Arts Recognition Award from the Daughters of the American Revolution in March 2012, a Lifetime Achievement Award from Delta Delta Delta sorority in 2006, and inclusion in the 1995-96 International Charter Edition of "Who's Who in Creativity" from The World Forum on Creativity in Washington, DC.
