= Charles Tersolo =

American painter

Charles Tersolo (born 1974 in Rochester, New Hampshire) is a Boston artist and Copley Society of Art member. He paints much of his works outdoors, or en plein air in the tradition of Corot, Monet, and American Impressionists such as Childe Hassam. The coloring of his works is closer to the broad palette of the Boston School of painters, who mix American impressionist technique with more traditional coloring and paint application.

His largest public work is a Synthetic Impressionist piece of the Harvard Footbridge. This 9 foot by 4.5 feet high painting resides in the lobby of the Harvard Doubletree Hotel. Other public works include a painting of the South End of Boston in the Back Bay Hilton of Boston.

Subject matter covered by this artist includes Provincetown, Boston, Paris, the Grand Canyon, Santa Fe, Monument Valley, Valley of the Gods, New York City, San Francisco, Portland, Cape Elizabeth, and Mount Desert Island, Maine, and Portsmouth, New Hampshire.
