= Boston school (painting) =

American group of artists

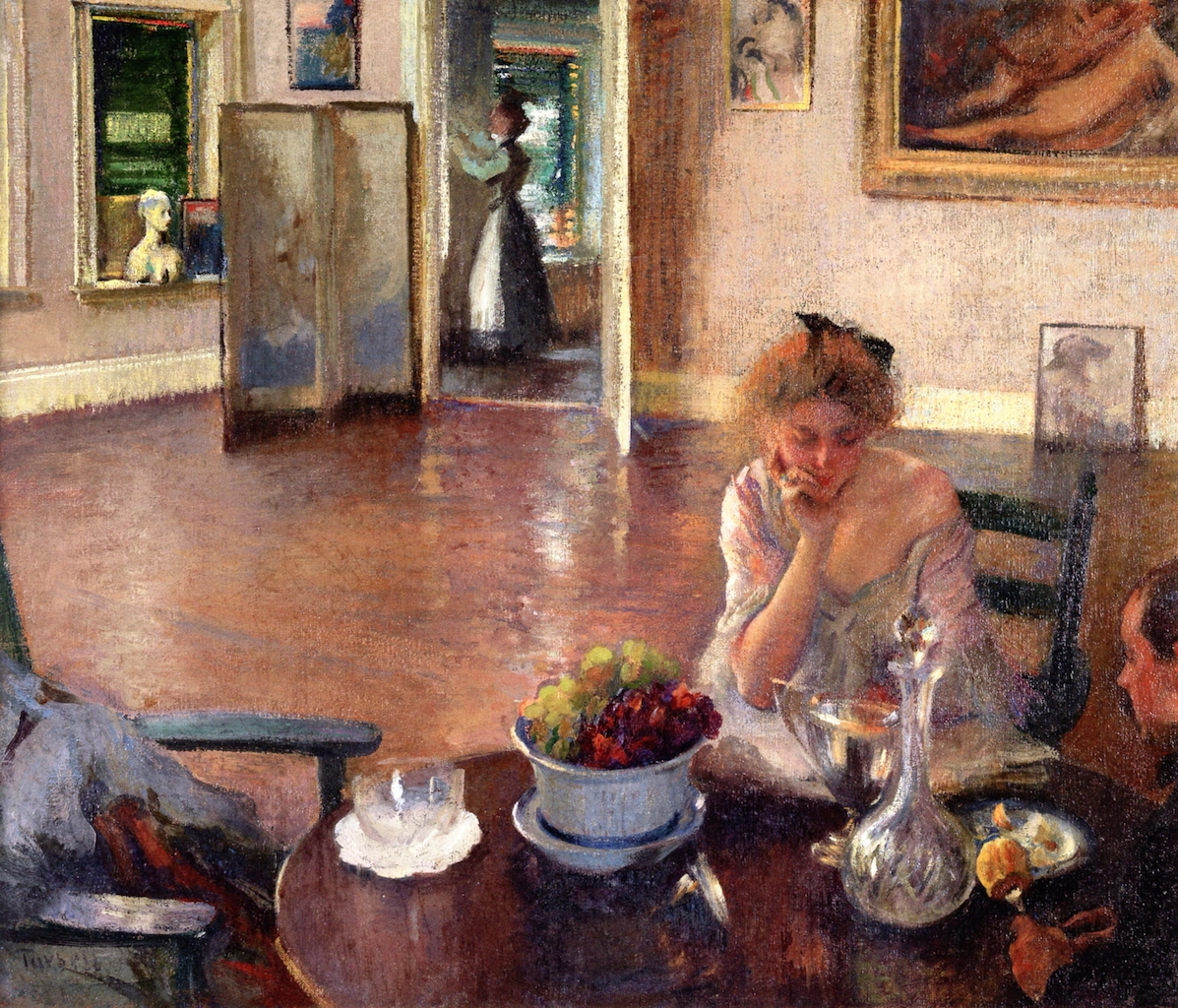
The Breakfast Room by Edmund C. Tarbell, ca. 1902

The Boston school was a group of Boston-based painters active in the first three decades of the twentieth century. Often classified as American Impressionists, they had their own regional style, combining the painterliness of Impressionism with a more conservative approach to figure painting and a marked respect for the traditions of Western art history. Their preferred subject matter was genteel: portraits, picturesque landscapes, and young women posing in well-appointed interiors. Major influences included John Singer Sargent, Claude Monet, and Jan Vermeer. Key figures in the Boston school were Edmund C. Tarbell, Frank Weston Benson, and William McGregor Paxton, all of whom trained in Paris at the Académie Julian and later taught at the School of the Museum of Fine Arts. Their influence can still be seen in the work of some contemporary Boston-area artists.

== History ==
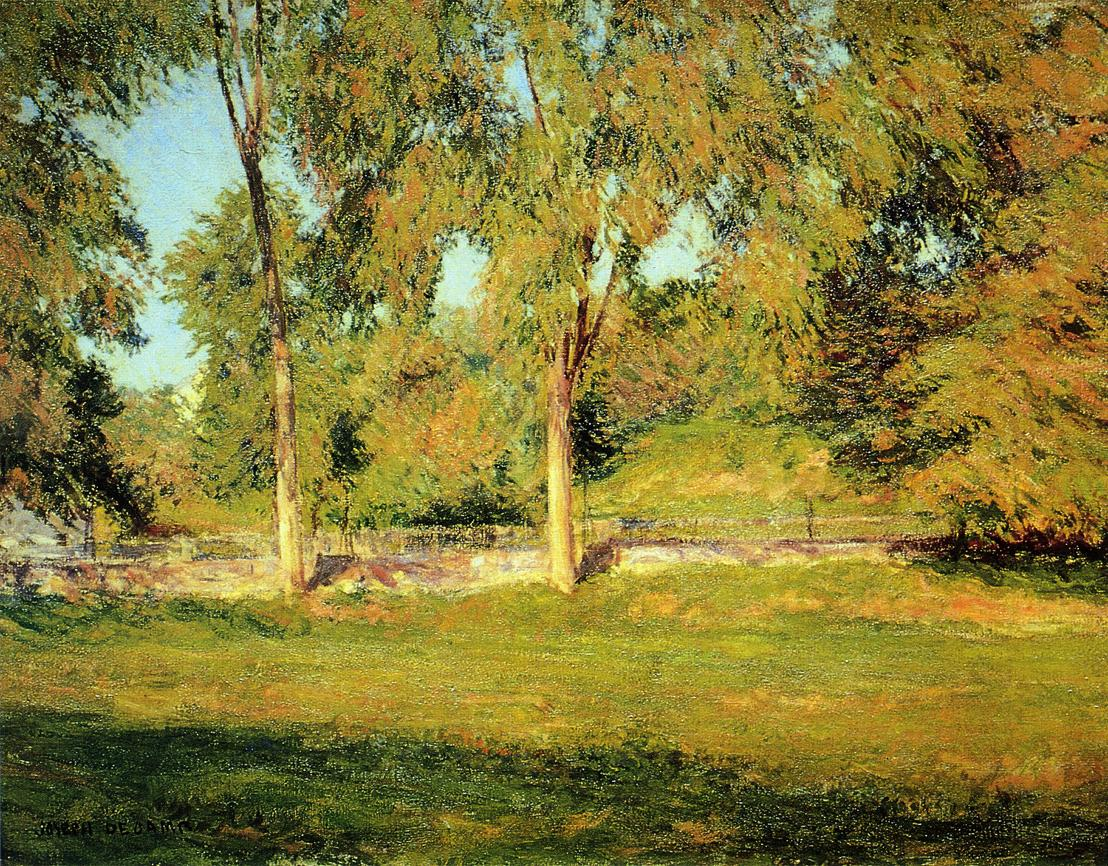
September Afternoon by Joseph DeCamp, 1895

The progenitors of the Boston school were Edmund C. Tarbell, Frank Weston Benson, and William McGregor Paxton, all of whom trained in Paris at the Académie Julian and later taught at the School of the Museum of Fine Arts. Their interest in modern French art can be traced to William Morris Hunt, a well-known teacher, painter, and taste-maker in late nineteenth-century Boston. After a visit to Paris, Hunt, who was on the original advisory board of the Museum of Fine Arts, encouraged prominent Bostonians to invest in the work of French artists such as Millet, Monet, and Renoir. Through his influence, the MFA hosted the first American exhibition of Monet's work in 1911.

Tarbell, Benson, and Paxton trained at the museum school in its early days. Tarbell eventually became so influential that the painters in his immediate circle were referred to by critics of the time as "Tarbellites". The Tarbellites specialized at first in Impressionistic and Barbizon-influenced landscapes. Later they gravitated to indoor scenes, typically featuring women engaged in household duties, recalling the domestic subjects of Dutch painters such as Vermeer. They also painted visually appealing still lifes and portraits after the manner of John Singer Sargent.

From these various influences, the Boston painters synthesized their own regional style. As painter William Merritt Chase remarked at the time, "A new type has appeared, the offspring, as we know, of European stock, but which no longer resembles it." They placed a high value on technical skill, accurate visual representation, and classical beauty, while adopting what was then a very modern, "loose" style of painting from the French.

Other painters associated with the Boston school include Joseph DeCamp, Philip Leslie Hale, Lilian Westcott Hale, John Joseph Enneking, Gretchen Woodman Rogers, Aldro Hibbard, Frederic Porter Vinton, Lilla Cabot Perry, Elizabeth Okie Paxton, Hermann Dudley Murphy, W. Lester Stevens, and others. Tarbell's teacher at the museum school, Emil Otto Grundmann, is sometimes included in this group.

In addition to paintings, the Boston Museum of Fine Arts includes sculptures and drawings in its Boston school gallery, such as "Blind Cupid" by Bela Pratt and pastel drawings by Laura Coombs Hills.

== Ongoing tradition ==
Later artists working in this style include R. H. Gammell, Yoshi Mizutani, Charles Tersolo, Thomas R Dunlay, Melody Phaneuf, Sam Vokey, Candace Whittemore Lovely, and Dianne Panarelli Miller. Dana Levin, founder of the New School of Classical Art, an atelier in Pawtucket, Rhode Island, cites the Boston school as a key influence. Charles H. Cecil, founder of Charles H. Cecil Studios in Florence, Italy, was trained by R. H. Ives Gammell and continues to pass on the methods of the Boston painters to his students. Several artists working in the tradition of the Boston school exhibit at the Copley Society of Art and the Guild Of Boston Artists on Newbury Street.

== Reception ==
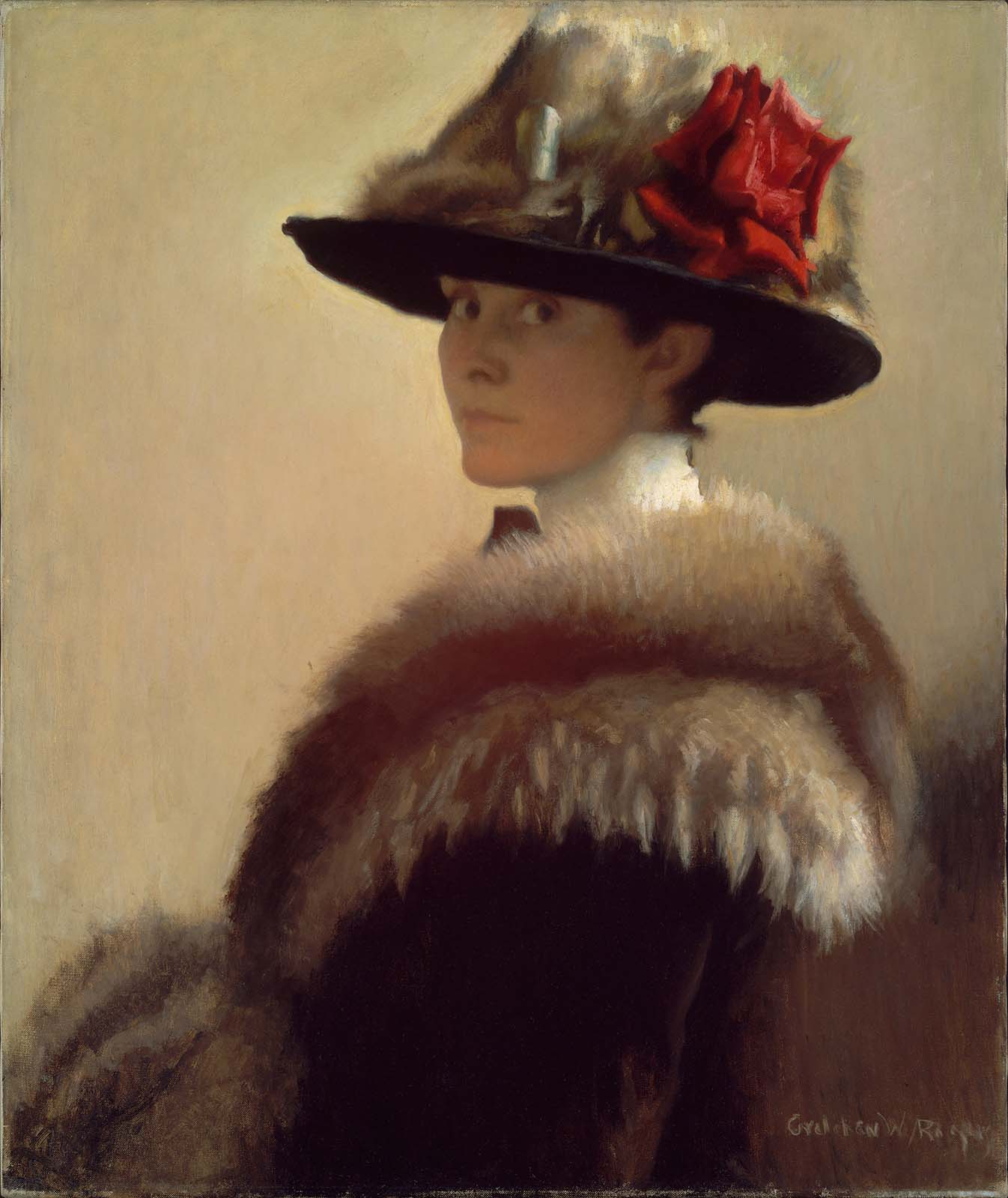
Woman in a Fur Hat by Gretchen Woodman Rogers, ca. 1915

Although they are now seen as traditionalists, painters of the Boston school were criticized by academics in the early days for their daring use of Impressionistic techniques. They soon achieved national renown, and continued to dominate the art scene in aesthetically conservative Boston through the 1930s and into the forties. They were admired for their dedication to craftsmanship and beauty at a time when modernists were challenging traditional artistic values.

In recent times they have come under criticism for focusing on the lives of the upper class. Though not necessarily well off themselves, many of the artists worked on commission for wealthy Boston Brahmin patrons. In At Beck and Call: The Representation of Domestic Servants in Nineteenth-Century American Painting, Elizabeth O'Leary notes that servants in paintings of the time were often framed in windows and doorways, creating a distancing effect, as seen in Tarbell's "The Breakfast Room" (above). Where they were prominently featured in paintings, she argues that they were treated as status symbols, akin to valuable possessions. Chapter 6 of the book, titled "Bridget in Service to the Boston School: 1892-1923", concerns the use of Irish servants as models.

Art historians have noted that Boston was a particularly receptive city for women artists. A 2001 exhibition at the Museum of Fine Arts, A Studio of Her Own: Women Artists in Boston, 1870-1940, included the work of several women artists associated with the Boston school, including Gretchen Woodman Rogers and Lilian Westcott Hale. Rogers's "Woman in a Fur Hat" (right) appears on the cover of the exhibition catalog. Rogers studied at the museum school with Tarbell, who considered her a genius. Boston's acceptance of women artists notwithstanding, the paintings of the Boston school typically depicted women indoors, reposing or engaged in domestic duties, a tendency characterized by at least one critic as anti-feminist.

== See also ==
- Boston Expressionism
