= Dwight Shepler =

American naval officer and painter

Dwight Shepler (August 11, 1905 – September 2, 1974) was an American naval officer and painter.

He was born in Everett, Massachusetts. He graduated from Williams College in 1928, as well as studying in Boston Museum School of Fine Art. In 1942 he received a commission from the US Navy's officer-artist program and was soon sent into the South Pacific.

In 1943 he went to Derry, Northern Ireland (October 1943) and England and took part in the 1944 Normandy invasion as an artist. With events captured clearly in his mind and on film, Shepler went home to Massachusetts to create more details painting from his sketches and film footage. Over his entire career he observed the landings at Ormoc Bay and Lingayen Gulf and operations at Corregidor and Bataan. Again he took all the images back home to finalize the last of over 300 paintings in total. He finally retired from the service with the rank of commander and was awarded the Bronze Star.

After his career he continued to paint landscapes, sports and portraits in watercolor. He remained active in his later days being an educator and the President of the Guild of Boston Artists. He died in Weston, Massachusetts.
