= Charles Herbert Woodbury =

American painter (1864–1940)

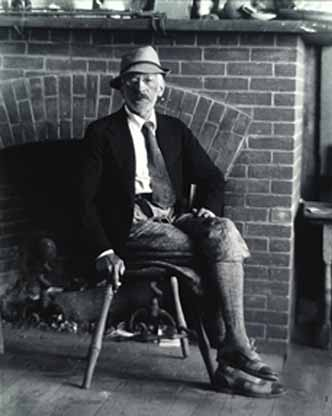
- Born: July 14, 1864; Lynn, Massachusetts, U.S.
- Died: January 21, 1940 (aged 75); Jamaica Plain, Boston, Massachusetts
- Education: Massachusetts Institute of Technology
- Spouse: Marcia Oakes

Charles Herbert Woodbury (July 14, 1864 – January 21, 1940) was an American marine painter.

== Biography ==
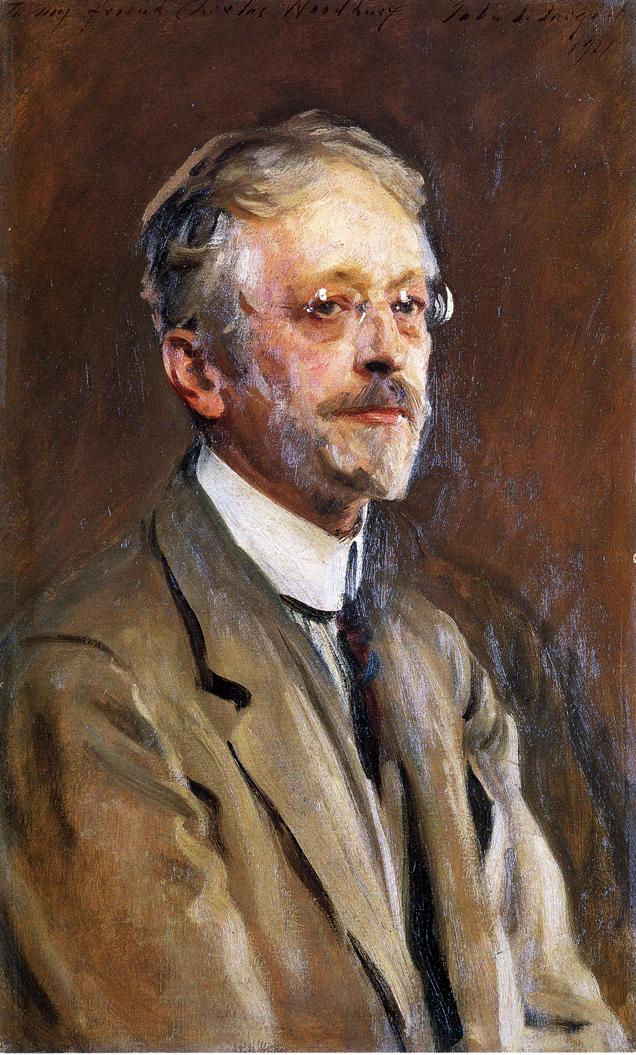
Charles Woodbury by John Singer Sargent (1921)

Woodbury was born on July 14, 1864, in Lynn, Massachusetts, where his earliest work was part of the oeuvre of the group later known as the Lynn Beach Painters. While an undergraduate at MIT he became a regular exhibitor at, and at 19 the youngest member of, the Boston Art Club. In 1886, after graduating from the Massachusetts Institute of Technology with degree in Mechanical Engineering, Woodbury had great success painting up the New England coast and in the towns and beaches of Nova Scotia and exhibiting the results. From January to June 1891 he was a pupil of the Académie Julian in Paris, after which he went to Holland, where he studied the techniques of the modern Dutch painters. Upon his return to New England he settled in Boston for his winter studio and spent his summers in the small fishing village of Perkins Cove in Ogunquit, Maine; there he founded one of the most successful of the summer art colony schools that even survived his death. In 1928, Woodbury (along with Gertrude Fiske and a group of other area-artists) founded the Ogunquit Art Association.

Woodbury was one of the most sought-after teachers of his generation, having begun teaching on a regular basis while a freshman at M.I.T. Ironically, he had little formal training himself other than a few months of classes at the Academy Julian in Paris. Like Winslow Homer, another New England painter with an affinity for summers in Maine, he preferred "to work out his salvation with little help from others in his profession". Nevertheless, Woodbury maintained a close friendship with John Singer Sargent and a pleasant acquaintance with many of his contemporaries including J. Alden Weir and Childe Hassam. He was president of the Boston Watercolor Society, and became associate of the National Academy of Design, New York in 1906 and a full member in 1907. His wife, Marcia Oakes Woodbury, born in 1865 at South Berwick, Maine, also became known as a painter. She died in 1913, aged 49.

Woodbury becamed skilled at capturing the compositions of both coastline and sea. He believed seeing and understanding movement was fundamental to his own art and teachings, and he reflected in his own words: "Paint in verbs, not nouns." In the words of his son David, Woodbury "...painted what he saw, satisfied that what he saw was really there, all in proper relationship, checked and rechecked by endless reference to the real world".

In his later years he spent his winters in the Caribbean sailing from island to island painting watercolor studies of the beaches and town backed by dramatic mountains and clouds. Over a large part of his career he made some of the most expressive etchings of any American artist of his time, completing more than 500 plates and teaching many younger artists to express themselves in this medium. He died on January 21, 1940, aged 75, in Jamaica Plain, Boston.

Woodbury engaged in over 100 solo exhibitions throughout his career, and was included in all of the major invitational and juried shows throughout the country. His work may be found currently in The Art Institute of Chicago, The Museum of Fine Arts, Boston, and New York’s Metropolitan Museum of Art among many others.

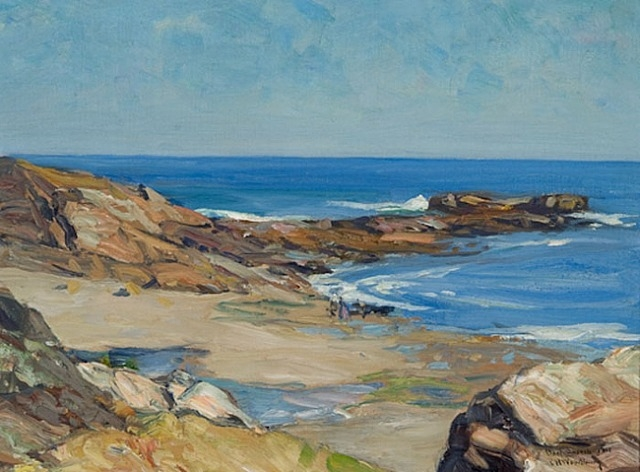
Perkins Cove, Ogunquit, Maine

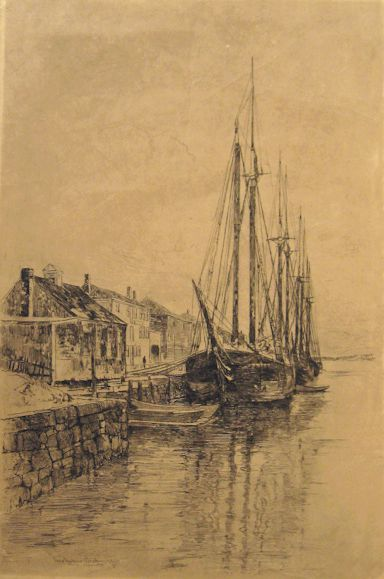
Derby Wharf, Salem (1889)

== Chronology ==
1881 At 17, becomes the youngest honoree of the Boston Art Club.
1882 Begins studies at MIT.
1886 Graduates from MIT with a degree in mechanical engineering.
1887 Takes a studio in Boston and teaches drawing.
1888 First recorded visit to Ogunquit, ME.
1890 Marries former student, Marcia Oakes. They travel together to Europe.
1891 Studies at the Académie Julian under Boulanger and Lefebvre.
1896 Moves to Ogunquit with Marcia after the birth of their son, David.
1897 Takes Second Prize for Mid-Ocean painting at the Tennessee Centennial Exposition.
1898 Founds his Ogunquit School.
1906 Elected an associate of the National Academy of Design.
1907 Elected full member of the National Academy of Design.
1913 Death of wife, Marcia Oakes.
1928 Founds (along with Gertrude Fiske and other Ogunquit-area artists) the Ogunquit Art Association.

== Collections ==
- Addison Gallery of American Art
- Art Institute of Chicago
- Boston Public Library
- Boston Athenaeum
- Bowdoin College Museum of Art
- Chrysler Museum of Art
- Cleveland Museum of Art
- Currier Gallery of Art
- El Paso Museum of Art
- Farnsworth Art Museum
- Fine Arts Museum of San Francisco
- Harvard University Art Museums
- Isabella Stewart Gardner Museum
- Maier Museum of Art at Randolph College
- Metropolitan Museum of Art
- Museum of Fine Arts, Boston
- Ogunquit Museum of American Art
- Portland Museum of Art
- Rhode Island School of Design – Museum of Art
- San Diego Museum of Art
- Smithsonian American Art Museum
- Virginia Museum of Fine Arts
- Private collection of Michael Maglaras

== Exhibitions ==
- 1887 J. Eastman Chase Gallery, MA
- 1902 Art Institute of Chicago, IL
- 1910 Cincinnati Art Museum, OH
- 1910 City Art Museum of St. Louis, MO
- 1912 Buffalo Fine Arts Academy, NY
- 1913 Detroit Museum of Art, MI
- 1925 Frederick Keppel & Co., NY
- 1939 Winchester Public Library, MA
- 1940 Cleveland Museum of Art, OH
- 1945 Museum of Fine Arts, Boston, MA
- 1968 Adelson Galleries Inc., MA
- 1978 Vose Galleries of Boston, MA
- 2016 York Public Library, York, MA

== Memberships ==
- Boston Art Club
- Guild of Boston Artists
- National Academy of Design
- Ogunquit Art Association
- Salmagundi Club
- Society of American Artists
- Watercolor Club of Boston

== Suggested Resources ==
- Gammell, R. H. Ives. "The Boston Painters 1900-1930". Orleans, MA: Parnassus Press, 1986.
- Howlett, D. Roger. "The Lynn Beach Painters." Boston: Copley Square Press, 1998.
- Jarzombek, Nancy Allyn. Boston Art Club: 1855-1950. Boston, MA: Vose Galleries of Boston, 2000.
- Loria, Joan, and Warren A. Seamans. "Earth, Sea and Sky – Charles H. Woodbury – Artist and Teacher, 1864-1940," exhibition catalogue. Cambridge, Massachusetts: The MIT Museum, 1998.
- Woodbury, Charles H. and Elizabeth W. Perkins. "The Art of Seeing: Mental Training Through Drawing". New York: C. Scribner’s Sons, 1925.
- Young, George M. and Charles H. Woodbury. "Force through Delicacy: the Life and Art of Charles H. Woodbury." Portsmouth, NH: Peter E. Randall Publisher, 1998.
