= Emil Otto Grundmann =

German-American painter (1844–1890)

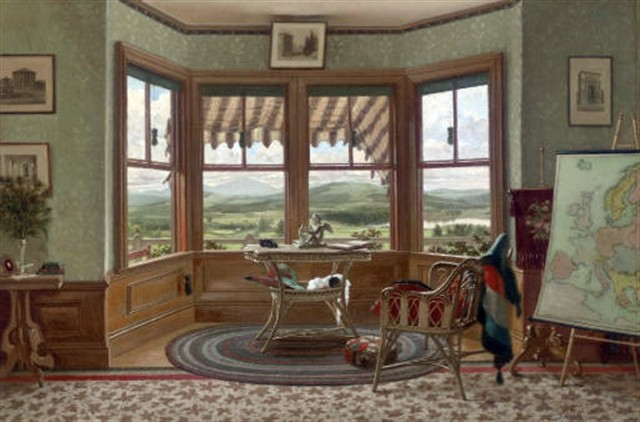
Interior at the Mountains

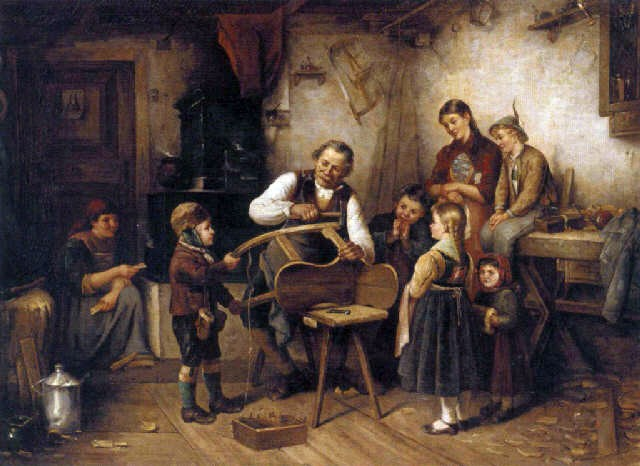
The Sleigh Maker

Professor Emil Otto Grundmann (1844 – 27 August 1890) was a German painter. He was born in Meissen and studied in Antwerp under Baron Hendrik Leys, and in Düsseldorf before moving to America where he became a noted painter. He was the first Director of the School of the Museum of Fine Arts, in Boston, an appointment in which Francis Davis Millet, an old Antwerp friend, was instrumental. One of his colleagues at the School was Joseph DeCamp. He died in Dresden.

Many notable American artists attended his classes and were influenced by his European ideas. Some students who later became prominent were Edmund C. Tarbell, Edward Clark Potter, Robert Reid, Ernest Fenollosa, Frank Weston Benson and Charles Henry Turner.

== See also ==
- List of German painters
