= The Guild of Boston Artists =

Association of academic and realist Boston artists

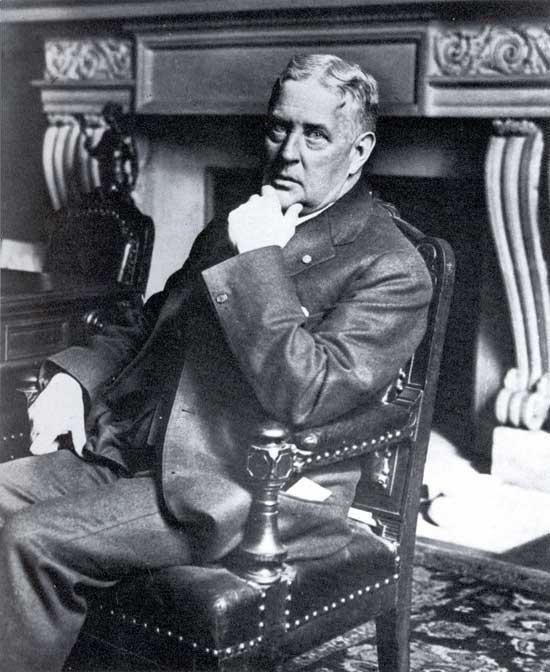
Edmund C. Tarbell, first president of The Guild of Boston Artists, c. 1919

The Guild of Boston Artists (The Guild) was founded in 1914 by a handful of Boston artists working in the academic and realist traditions. Among the founding members were Frank Weston Benson, William McGregor Paxton and Edmund C. Tarbell, who served as its first president through 1924. The organization holds exhibitions of its members' work several times a year as well as numerous one-person shows. Founded with the intention to promote the highest standards of quality, The Guild also hosts programs and competitions.

== History ==
The Guild of Boston Artists, a non-profit art organization, was founded in 1914 to "promote, nurture and encourage traditional art while adhering to the highest standards of quality and presentation." Founding members included Edmund C. Tarbell, William McGregor Paxton, Lilla Cabot Perry, Frank Weston Benson, Bela Pratt, Charles Herbert Woodbury, Ignaz Gaugengigl, and Gertrude Fiske.

Boston artists found it difficult to have their work exhibited outside of the local area. In response, seven area artists formed The Guild of Boston Artists. Modeled after the historic guilds of Europe, the organization held high professional standards in a supportive environment. In their Newberry Gallery, annual shows of works of all members were interspersed with two-week one-man shows that highlighted the work of individual artists.

In 1916 the Museum of Fine Arts, Boston temporarily put paintings from two of their galleries into storage to make room for a one-month exhibition of works of "some of the best work being done in Boston" by Guild members. Previously unsuccessful in garnering enough work of Boston artists for an exhibition, the museum was pleased both with the quality of works made available for the exhibition and the inclusiveness of Guild membership.

Works of early women members of the guild, including Laura Coombs Hills, Lilian Westcott Hale, Alice Ruggles Sohier, Lucy May Stanton, Mary Foote Hawley, Elizabeth Okie Paxton and Agnes Abbott, were exhibited in the 2001 retrospective show "A Woman's Perspective: Founding and Early Women Members of the Guild of Boston Artists, 1914–1945."

== Guild presidents ==
The presidents of the Guild include:

Name	Term
Edmund C. Tarbell	1914–1924
Frank Weston Benson	1924–1937
Leslie P. Thompsaon	1938–1950
R. H. Ives Gammell	1950–1952
Aldro Hibbard	1953–1959
A. Lassell Ripley	1959–1969
Dwight Shepler	1969–1973
Robert Douglas Hunter	1973–1978
Charles A. Mahoney	1978–1982
Robert Cormier	1982–1998
Thomas Dunlay	1998–2003
Paul Ingbretson	2003 – 2014
Jean G. Lightman	2014 –

== Membership ==
Over 60 artists from New England are currently represented by the gallery, covering a wide range of media and genres.

There are currently three forms of membership: Associate, Student and Patron memberships. Members are provided the opportunity to receive a discount for Guild classes workshops, and critiques and invitations to private events and special previews. Associate and student members are also able to submit work for juried exhibitions and are exempt from fees for selected juried exhibitions.

== Exhibitions and programs ==
Each year The Guild hosts painting exhibitions of its members. Ongoing displays of varying genres and media are displayed in the upper gallery. The President's Gallery is used for one-person shows and themed exhibits. The Guild offers educational programs for its artists, including classes, workshops, lectures and critiques. Juried competitions for Guild members are held in April and non-members in October each year.

The Guild's building is located at 162 Newberry Street in the gallery district of Boston.

== Gallery ==
The gallery contains works of some of the guild's members.

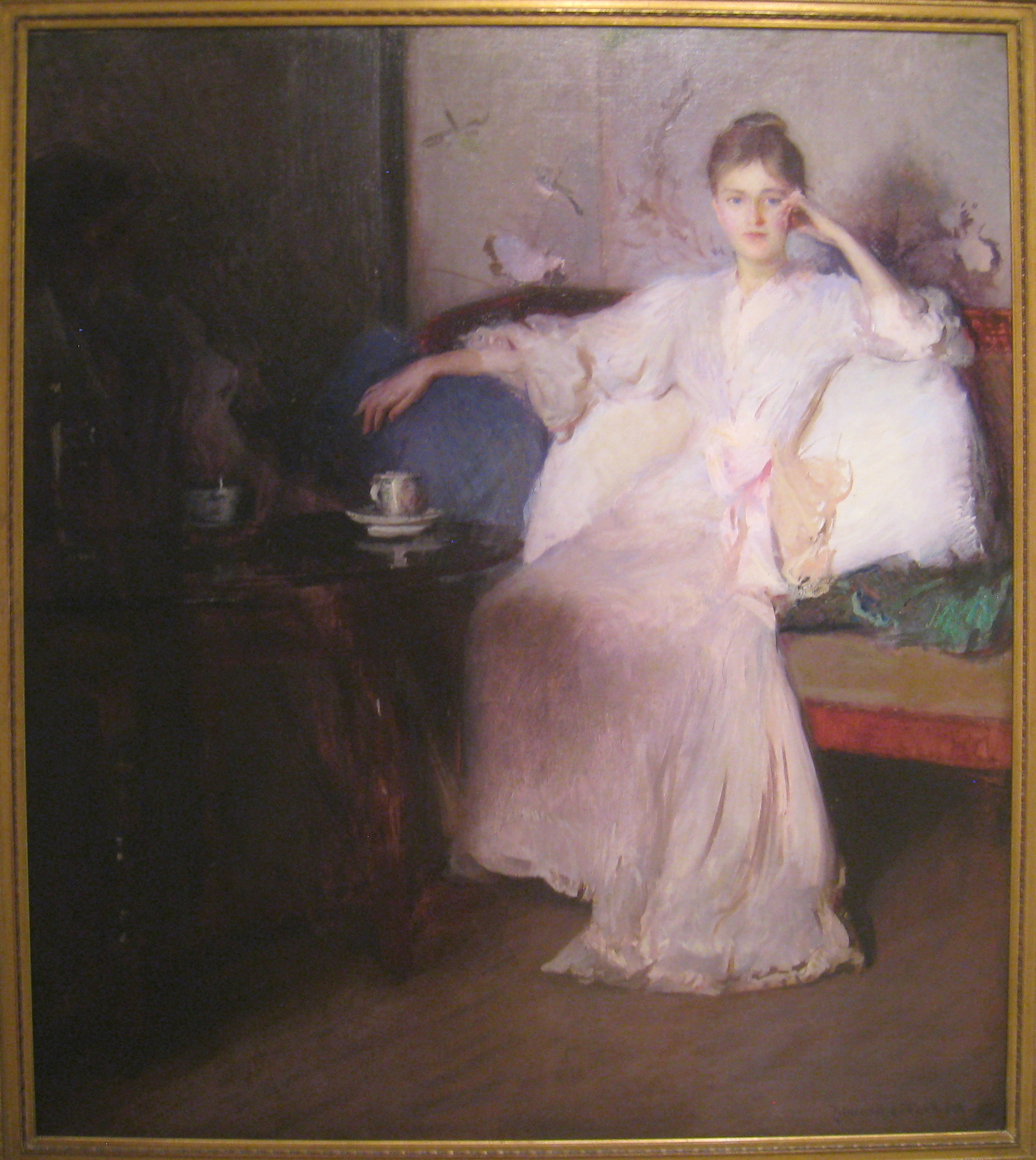
Edmund C. Tarbell, Arrangement in Pink and Gray (Afternoon Tea), c. 1894, Worcester Art Museum

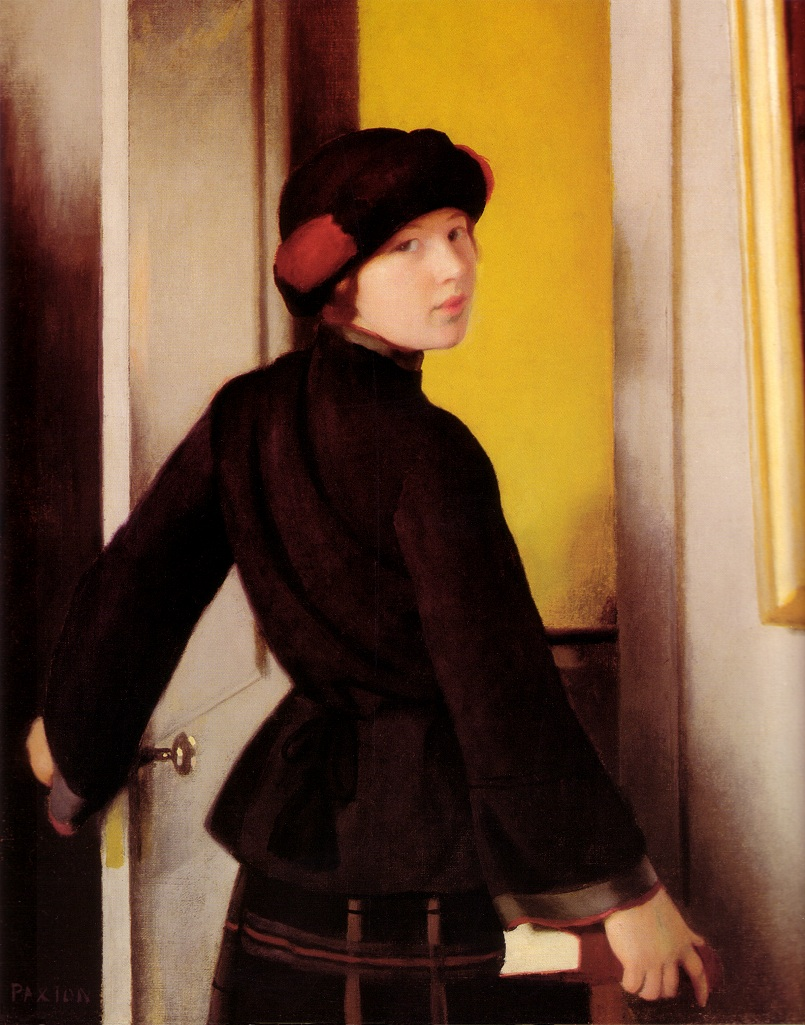
William McGregor Paxton, Leaving the Studio, 1921

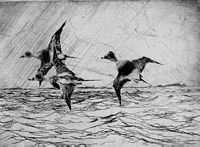
Frank Weston Benson, Old Squaws, drypoint, 1915, Art Gallery, University of New Hampshire

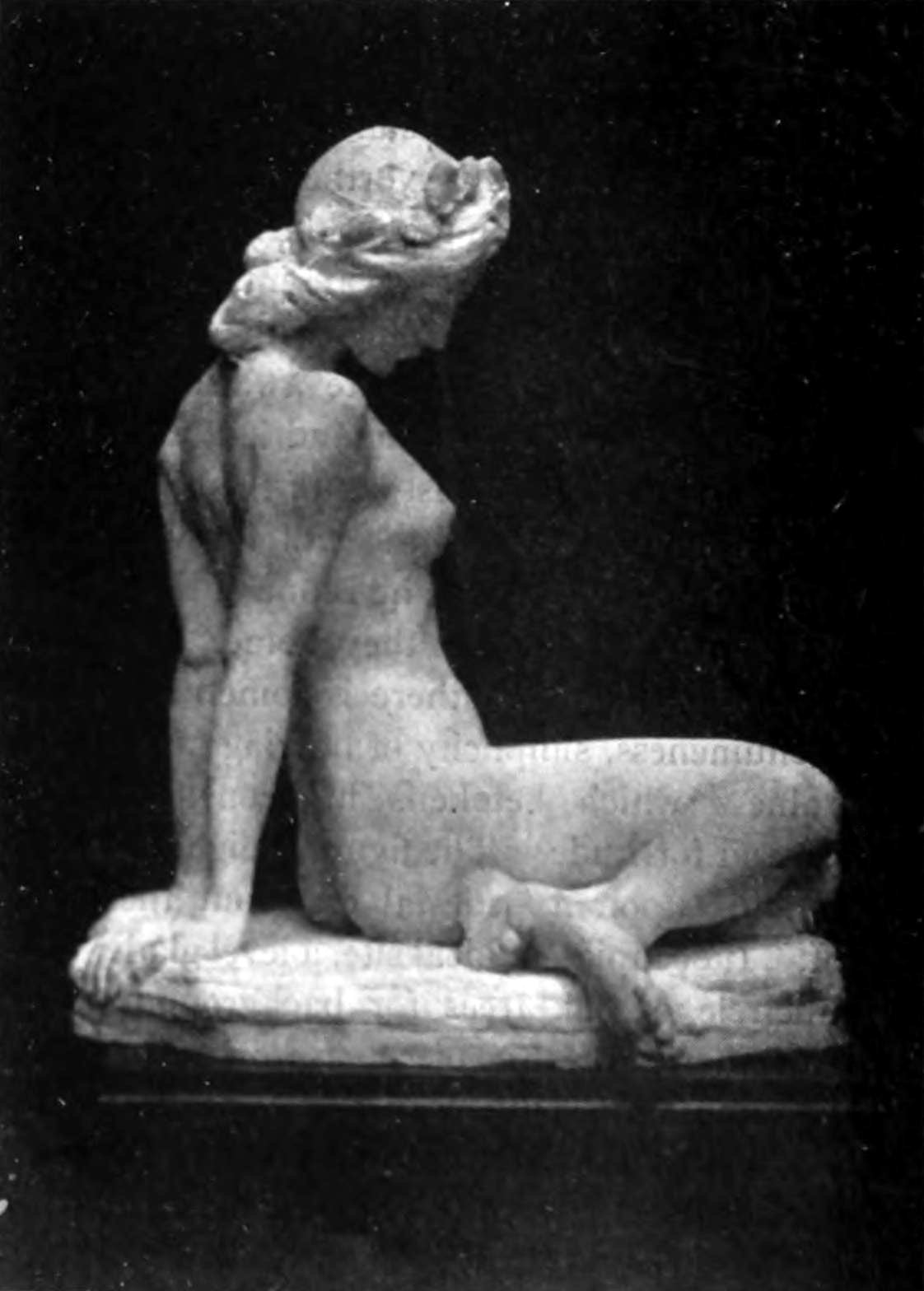
Bela Pratt, Figure from Fountain of Youth

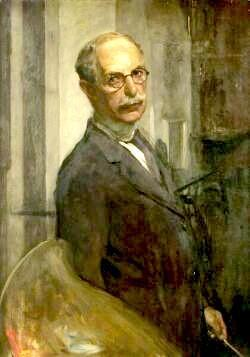
Ignaz Gaugengigl, Self-portrait

== See also ==
- The Boston School of painting
