= Frederick Warren Allen =

American sculptor (1888–1961)

- Born: May 5, 1888; North Attleborough, Massachusetts, US
- Died: January 9, 1961 (aged 72); Rumney, New Hampshire, US
- Education: School of the Museum of Fine Arts
- Occupation: Sculptor

Frederick Warren Allen (May 5, 1888 – January 9, 1961) was an American sculptor of the Boston School. One of the most prominent sculptors in Boston during the early 20th century and a master teacher at the School of the Museum of Fine Arts, Allen had a career in the arts that spanned more than 50 years.

== Early years ==
Allen was born May 5, 1888, in North Attleboro, Massachusetts, the son of Frank West Allen, a jewelry maker, and Esther Belcher Allen. Named after his grandfather, Frederick Deane Allen, he was fifth of six children and was expected to go into the family business. He worked in the jewelry shop during summers, learning various techniques that he used later in modeling and casting sculpture instead of making jewelry.

== Art education ==
Upon his graduation from Attleboro High School in 1907, Frederick W. Allen presented a bas-relief to his alma mater, the first work he had cast. He studied for a year at the Rhode Island School of Design in Providence under Manatt and Hazelton and, having determined to be a sculptor, enrolled at the School of the Museum of Fine Arts in Boston where he attended Bela Lyon Pratt's modeling classes for three-and-a-half years, winning many prizes and scholarships for the excellence of his work.

== In Paris ==
Allen fell in love with Agnes H. Horner and, on the day after her graduation from Attleboro High School as valedictorian, they married and departed for Paris. He studied and sculpted for the summer at the Académie Julian under Paul Landowski and the Académie Colarossi under Paul Wayland Bartlett. While in Paris he took the opportunity to spend time at the Luxembourg Museum where he studied Rodin and other contemporary sculptors and spent hours sketching from the rich offerings in the galleries of the city.

== Teaching ==
When he returned to Boston in the fall of 1913, he began teaching at the School of the Museum of Fine Arts as assistant instructor, a position that Bela Pratt helped him secure. He continued teaching until his retirement in 1954, becoming the head of the department in 1929. He was known affectionately by his students as "F.W." and earned the title of Emeritus, the first awarded by the school. Among his students was Mary Moore.

== Personal and family life ==
Allen raised and educated a family of five children. He supported his studio on Tavern Road a block from the museum, a colonial home for his family in Concord, Massachusetts, a cottage on North Haven Island in Maine, and a country cabin and later a home in Rumney, New Hampshire, where he retired after selling his studio in 1954.

== Summers in North Haven, Maine ==
Early in his career Pratt had encouraged the Allens to buy the cottage next to his own home on the rocky shores of a protected harbor on North Haven Island overlooking the Camden Hills. They purchased the property in 1914 and became part of a colony of Boston artists now known as the Bartlett's Harbor Artists' Colony. Allen, Frank Benson, Bela Pratt, and Beatrice Van Ness and their families, friends and students, all spent many summers in this spot. The island's natural beauty combined with the little colony's isolated location inspired their creative pursuits.

== Sculpture career ==
Bela Pratt, his mentor and friend, also provided Allen with his first major commission, to sculpt in granite one of three bas-reliefs to be installed on the Museum of Fine Art's new Evans Wing on the Fenway façade of the building. This brought immediate attention from the leaders of the Boston art community and was the beginning of a very productive sculpting period for him between 1913 and 1920. He exhibited during that time at the Museum of Fine Arts, the Guild of Boston Artists, of which he was a founding member, the Boston Art Club and the St. Botolph Club and frequented the other meeting place for artists, the Tavern Club. He was also a regular exhibitor at the Pennsylvania Academy of the Fine Arts throughout the 1920s. He was the Boston representative at an exhibit at the MOMA in 1933 and a regular at his hometown museum, the Concord Art Association.

Allen crafted the small and popular Beaux-Arts style bronzes, medical models for Harvard using the "lost wax" process, memorial tablets, portrait busts, portrait reliefs, "imaginative" pieces, garden fountains and life and death masques, as well as large memorials and architectural installations. His best-known large work is the pediment and statues atop the Supreme Courthouse in Manhattan. His sculptures are included in the collections of Boston's Museum of Fine Arts, the Metropolitan Museum, the Farnsworth Art Museum in Rockland Maine, the Concord Art Association, and the Smithsonian American Art Museum in DC. His own favorite piece, the heroic size Egyptian Head, was displayed in the New York World's Fair in 1939.

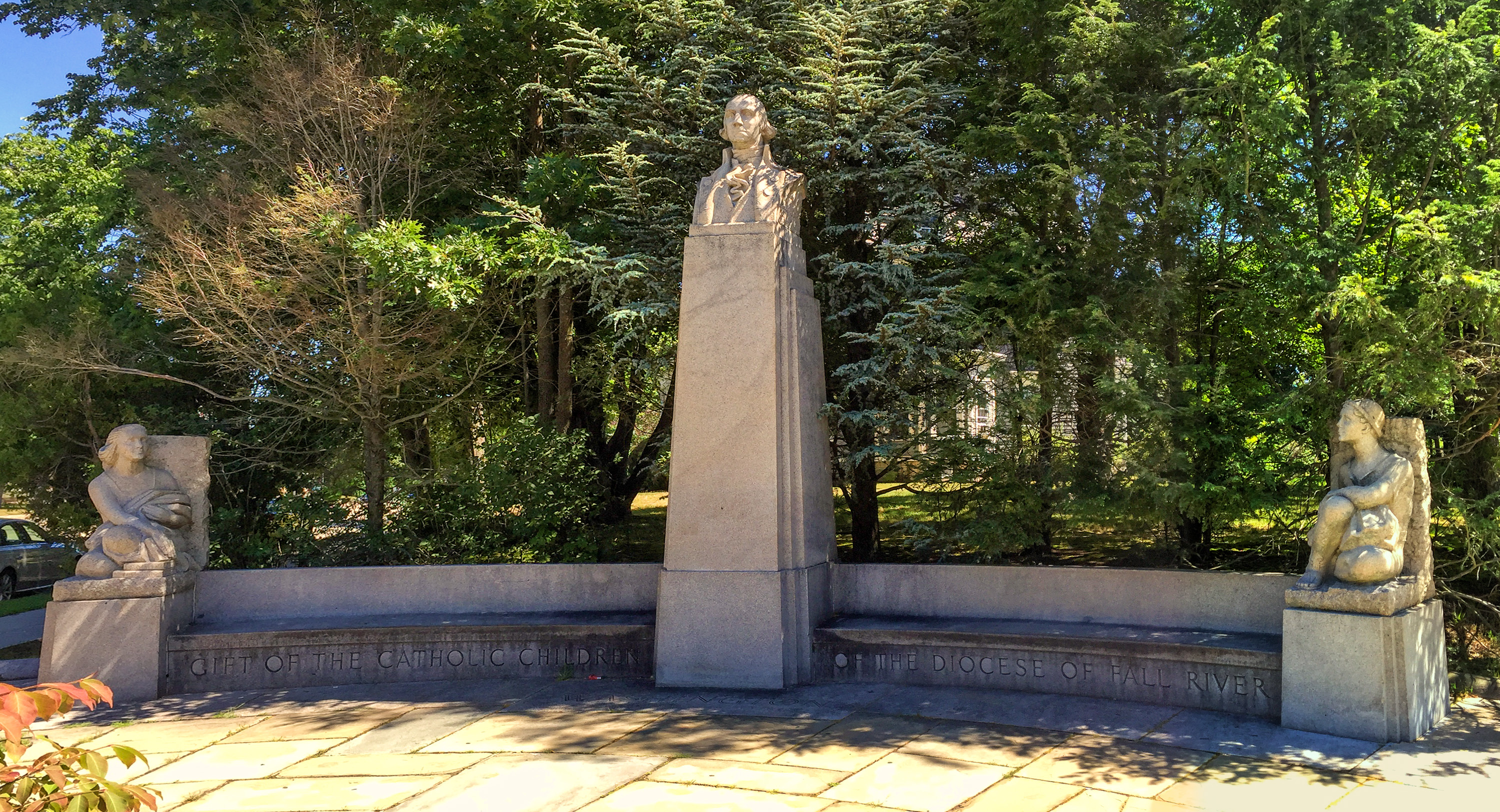
George Washington monument in Fall River, Massachusetts (1942)

On July 4, 1942, Allen unveiled a monument of George Washington in Fall River, Massachusetts, which was reported to be "of such artistic merit and patriotic intent as to attract nation-wide interest." The monument, carved from Deer Island granite, depicts a central portrait bust of Washington upon a pedestal. Curved benches on either side of the bust extend toward carvings of a boy and girl. The monument was paid for by Catholic children of Fall River.

It was the form that he turned to during the 1920s, carvings made directly from pieces of stone, mostly granite boulders from Maine that became the works closest to his heart and those for which he wanted to be remembered. He died January 9, 1961, at his retirement home in Rumney, New Hampshire, at the age of 73. His assistant Elizabeth MacLean Smith wrote, "Here his teachings will go on, through his children and his pupils. And the granite boulders which he carved shall remain witness to a true sculptor".

== Lineage and influences ==
- Augustus Saint-Gaudens > Bela Pratt >Frederick Allen
- Auguste Rodin > John Storrs (Allen's friend in Boston and Paris and a student of Rodin)
- Daniel Chester French (fellow resident of Concord)
- Charles Grafly who succeeded Bela Pratt at SMFA from 1917 to 1929 as head of the sculpture department and with whom he taught before he took over the department in 1929.
