= Bela Pratt =

American sculptor (1867–1917)

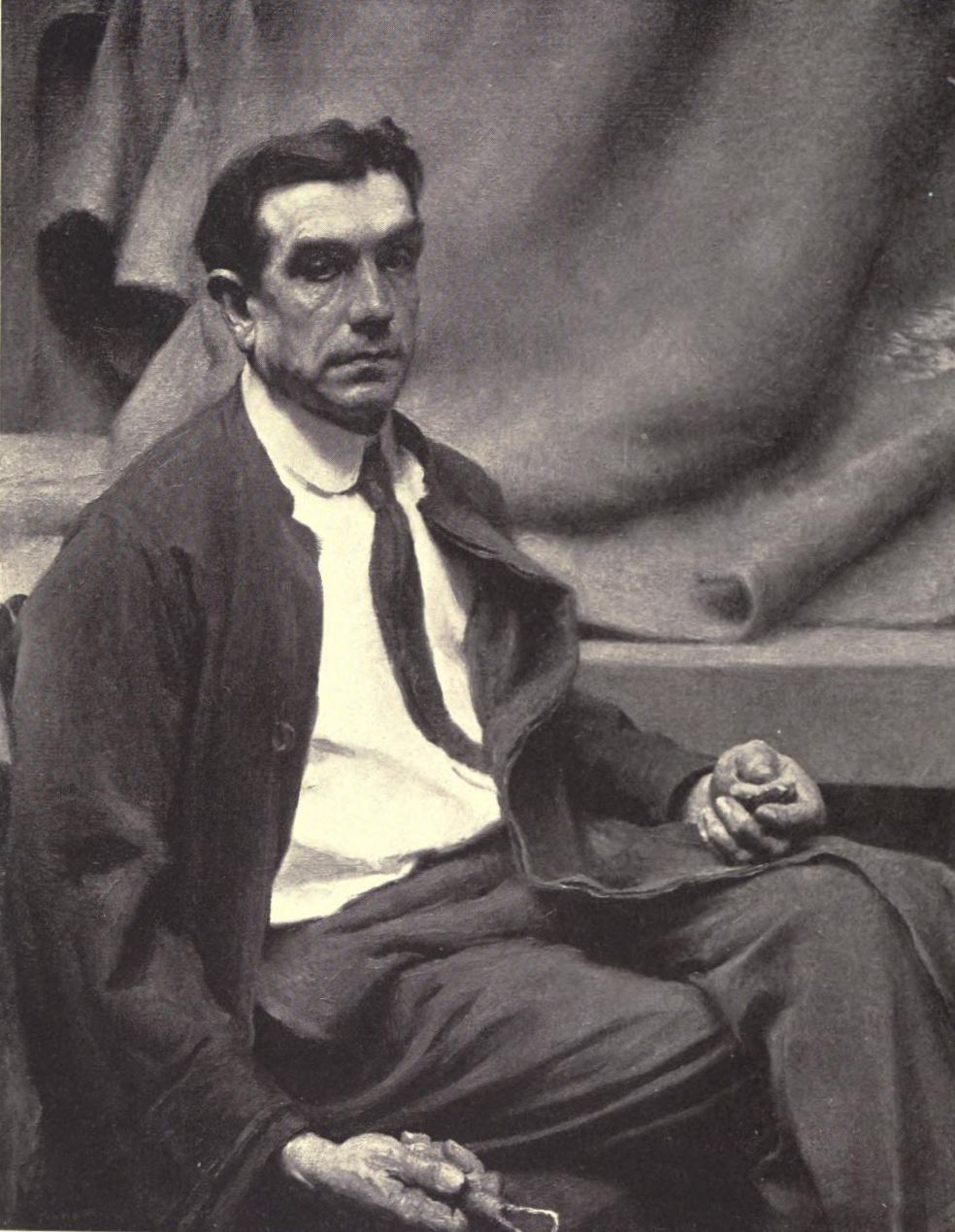
- Portrait of Bela Pratt (1918) by Howard E. Smith
- Born: December 11, 1867; Norwich, Connecticut, United States
- Died: May 17, 1917 (aged 49); Los Angeles, California, U.S.
- Occupation: Sculptor

Bela Lyon Pratt (December 11, 1867 – May 18, 1917) was an American sculptor from Connecticut.

== Life ==
Pratt was born in Norwich, Connecticut, to Sarah (Whittlesey) and George Pratt, a Yale-educated lawyer. His maternal grandfather, Oramel Whittlesey, was a pianoforte maker and founder in 1835 of Music Vale Seminary in Salem, Connecticut, the first music school in the country authorized to confer degrees to teach music. At 16, Pratt began studying at the Yale University School of Fine Arts, where his teachers included John Henry Niemeyer (1839–1932) and John Ferguson Weir (1841–1926).

After graduating from Yale, he enrolled at the Art Students League of New York where he took classes from William Merritt Chase (1849–1916), Kenyon Cox (1859–1919), Francis Edwin Elwell (1858–1922), and most important, Augustus Saint-Gaudens (1848–1907), who became his mentor. After a short stint in Saint-Gaudens' private studio, Pratt traveled to Paris, where he trained with sculptors Henri-Michel-Antoine Chapu (1833–1891) and Alexandre Falguière (1831–1900) at the École des Beaux-Arts.

In 1892, he returned to the United States to create two large sculptural groups representing The Genius of Navigation for the World's Columbian Exposition in Chicago. He also produced sculptures for the Pan-American Exposition at Buffalo in 1901. In 1893, he began a 25-year career as an influential teacher of modeling in the School of the Museum of Fine Arts, Boston. One of Pratt's most famous students at the School was John A. Wilson. During this time, Pratt sculpted a series of busts of Boston's intellectual community, including Episcopal minister Phillips Brooks (1899, Brooks House, Harvard University), Colonel Henry Lee (1902, Memorial Hall, Harvard University), and Boston Symphony Orchestra founder Henry Lee Higginson (1909, Symphony Hall, Boston). He became an associate of the National Academy in 1900.(1)

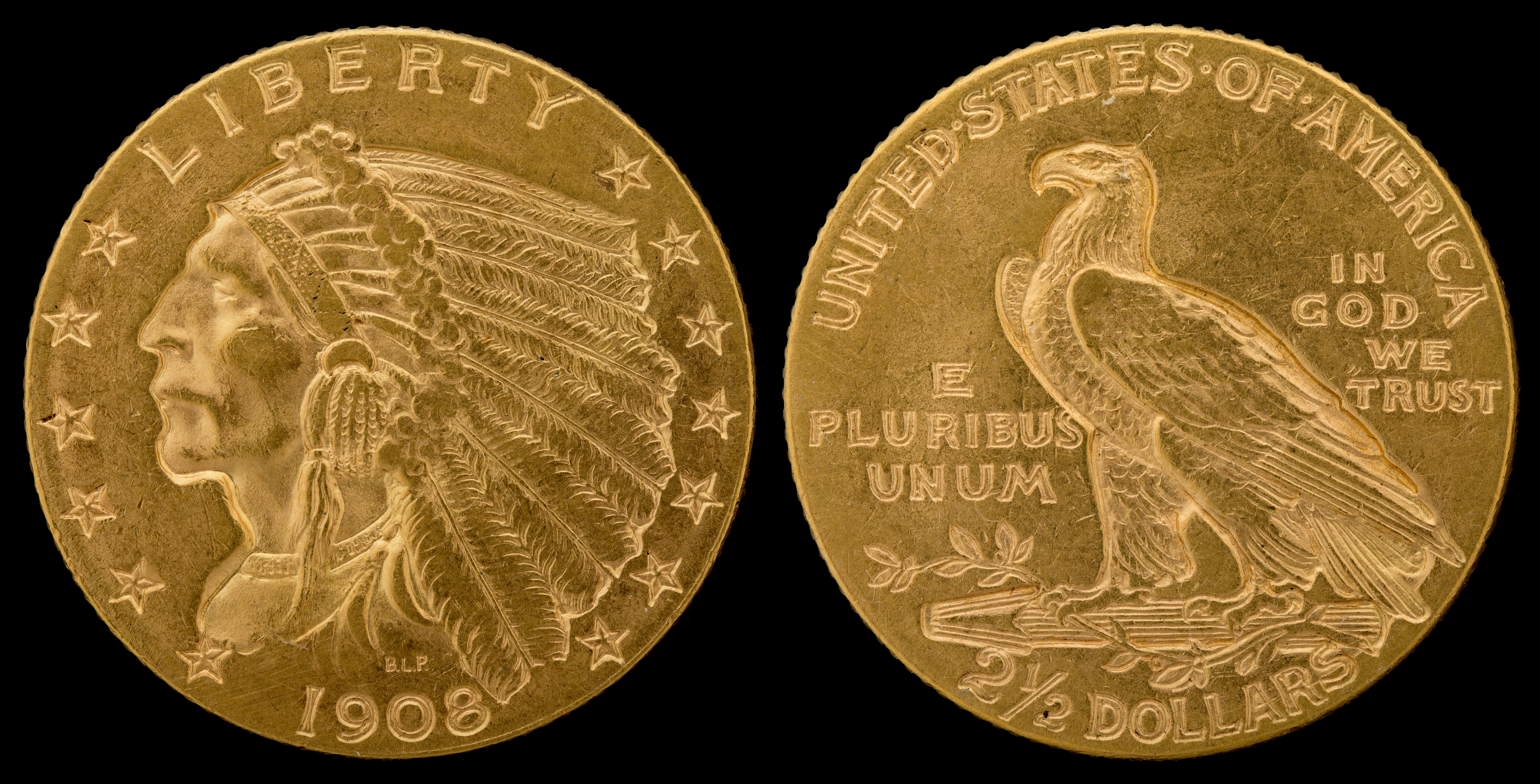
1908 Quarter eagle Indian Head design

When Saint-Gaudens' uncompleted group for the entrance to the Boston Central Library was rejected, Pratt was awarded a commission for personifications of Art and Science. Pratt continued Saint-Gaudens' influence in coin design after 1907. His gold Indian Head half ($5) and quarter ($2.50) eagle gold U.S. coins are known as the "Pratt coins" and feature an unusual incuse Indian head, the U.S. mint's only recessed design in circulation. A memorial exhibition of 125 of his sculptures was held at the Museum of Fine Arts, Boston in the spring of 1918.

From1898-1917 Pratt ran the sculpture department at the Massachusetts Normal School, which eventually became the School of the Museum of Fine Arts) along with Cyrus Dallin. Pratt's students included Frederick Warren Allen, Hazel Brill Jackson, Daisy Blanche King, Bashka Paeff, and Richard Henry Recchia, as well as his son Dudley Pratt.

== Selected works ==
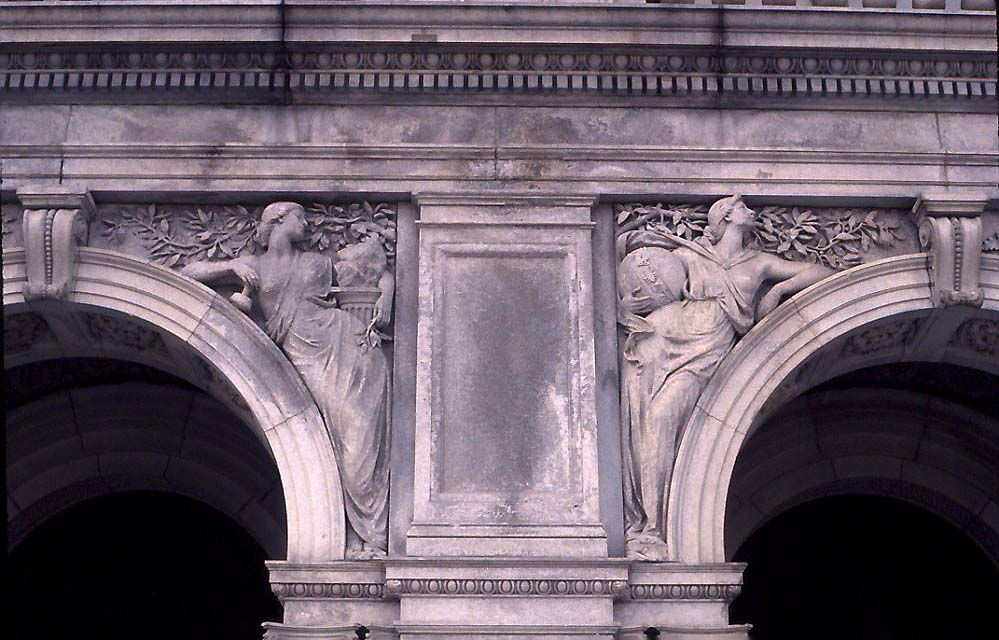
Art and Science on the Library of Congress Building, Washington DC, USA

- 1892 The Genius of Navigation – World's Columbian Exposition
- 1892 The Genius of Discovery – World's Columbian Exposition
- 1893 Clara and Lizzie, Daughters of Frederick and Elizabeth Shattuck (plaque) – National Gallery of Art
- 1895 Literature, Science, Art (Spandrel figures) Thomas Jefferson Building, Library of Congress, Washington, DC
- 1896 The Four Seasons (plaques) – 2nd floor pavilions, Thomas Jefferson Building, Library of Congress
- 1896 Figure of Victory - #1 turret U.S.S. Massachusetts, (Sculpture now housed at the US Naval Academy in Annapolis, Maryland).
- 1897 Dr. Henry Augustus Coit – St. Paul's School, Concord, New Hampshire
- 1902 General Benjamin Franklin Butler Monument - Hildreth Cemetery, Lowell, Massachusetts
- 1902 Colonel Henry Lee - Memorial Hall, Harvard University, Cambridge, Massachusetts
- 1906 Young Soldier – St. Paul's School, Concord, New Hampshire
- 1907 Andersonville Boy – State Capitol Grounds, Hartford, Connecticut
- 1908 Abraham Lincoln Monument – Lowell, Massachusetts
- 1910 Soldiers' and Sailors' Monument, Bell Rock Memorial Park, Malden, Massachusetts
- 1910 Nathaniel Hawthorne – Salem, Massachusetts
- 1910 Art w/palette right, Science w/sphere left, Boston Central Library, Boston, Massachusetts
- 1911 Army Nurses Memorial, Massachusetts State House, Boston
- 1913 The Whaleman – New Bedford, Massachusetts
- 1913 Edward Everett Hale – Boston Public Garden, Boston, Massachusetts
- 1913 Schoolboy of 1850 – Ashburnham, Massachusetts
- 1914 Grieving Mother - Washington Memorial Chapel, Valley Forge National Historical Park, Pennsylvania
- 1914 Nathan Hale – Yale University
  - Cast at the Central Intelligence Agency, Quantico, Virginia
  - Cast at the Department of Justice Building, Washington, D.C.
  - Cast at the Chicago Tribune, Chicago, Illinois
  - Cast at Fort Nathan Hale, New Haven, Connecticut
- 1916 Reverend Phillips Brooks, Old Common, North Andover, Massachusetts

== Gallery ==
Genius of Navigation (1893), World's Columbian Exposition, Chicago, Illinois

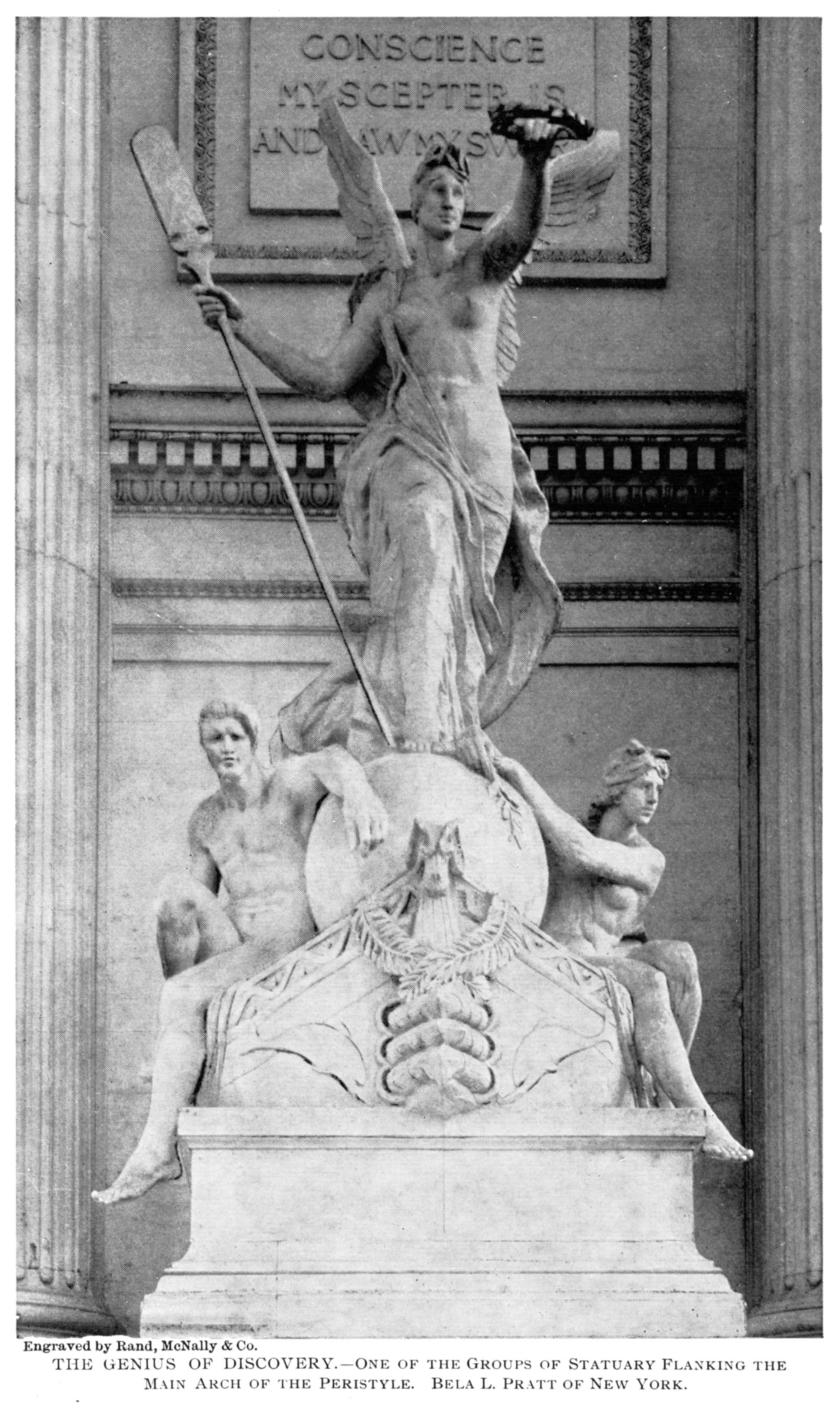
Genius of Discovery (1893), World's Columbian Exposition, Chicago, Illinois

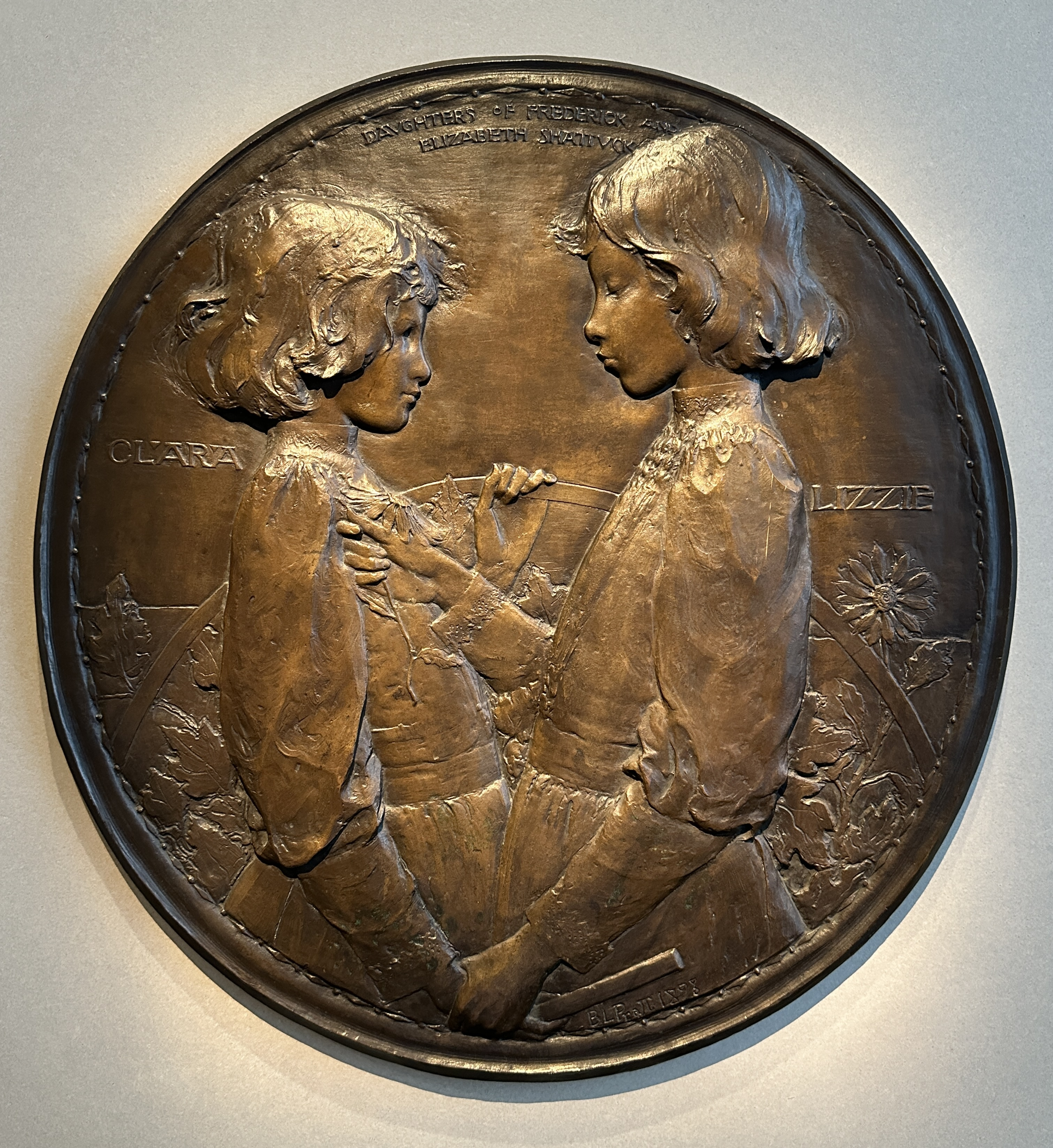
Clara and Lizzie, Daughters of Frederick and Elizabeth Shattuck (1983), National Gallery of Art, Washington, D.C.

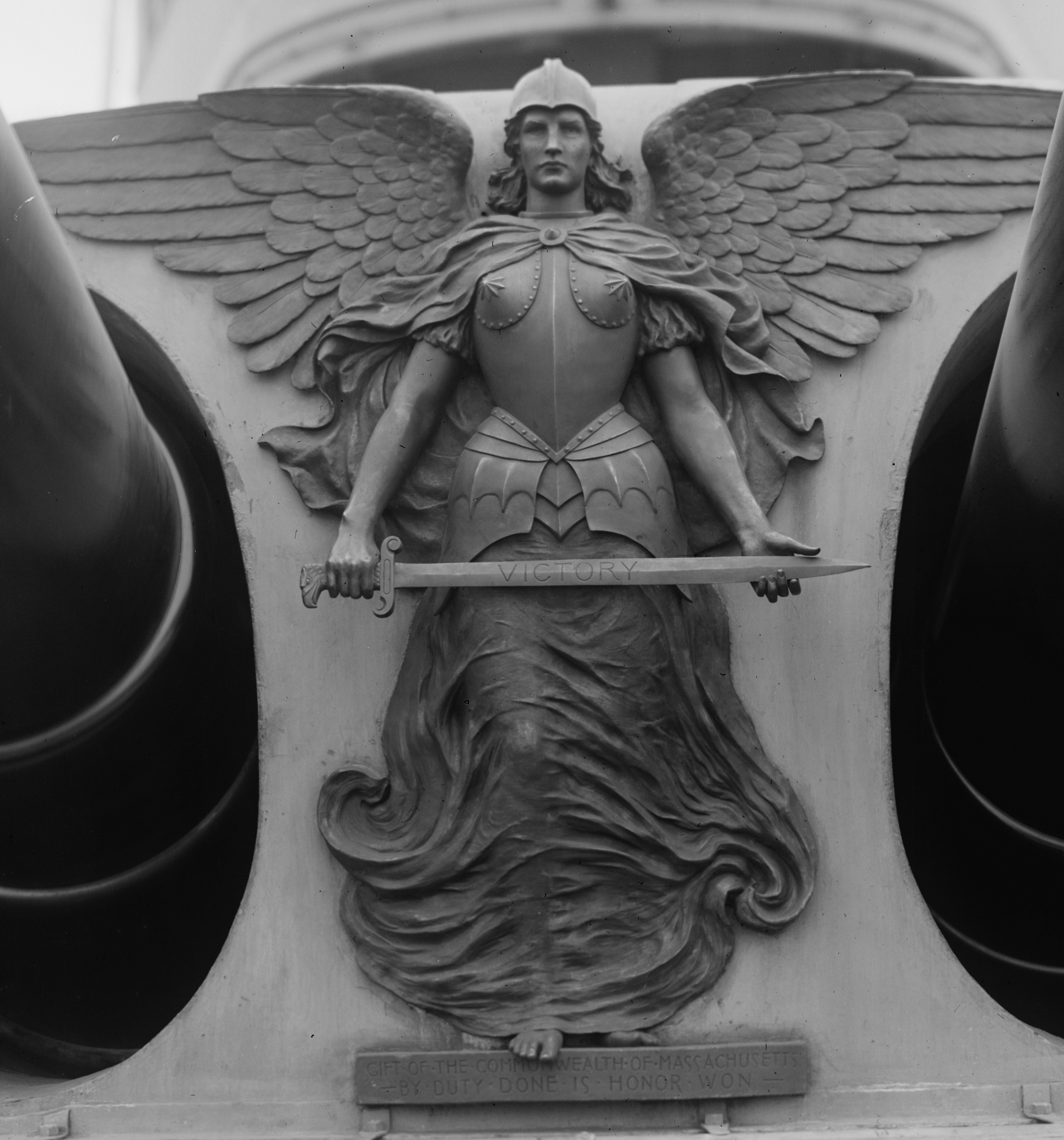
Figure of Victory (1896), #1 turret U.S.S. Massachusetts

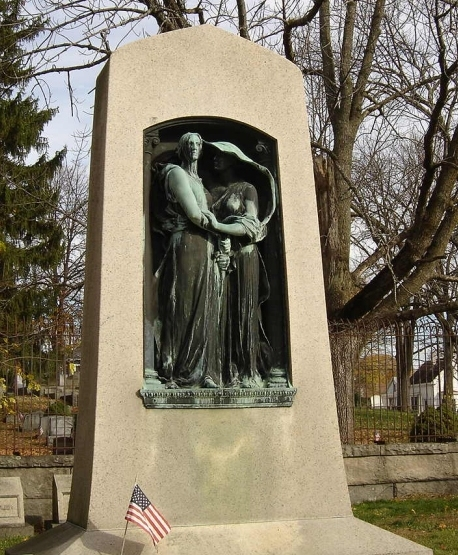
General Butler Monument (1902), Lowell, Massachusetts

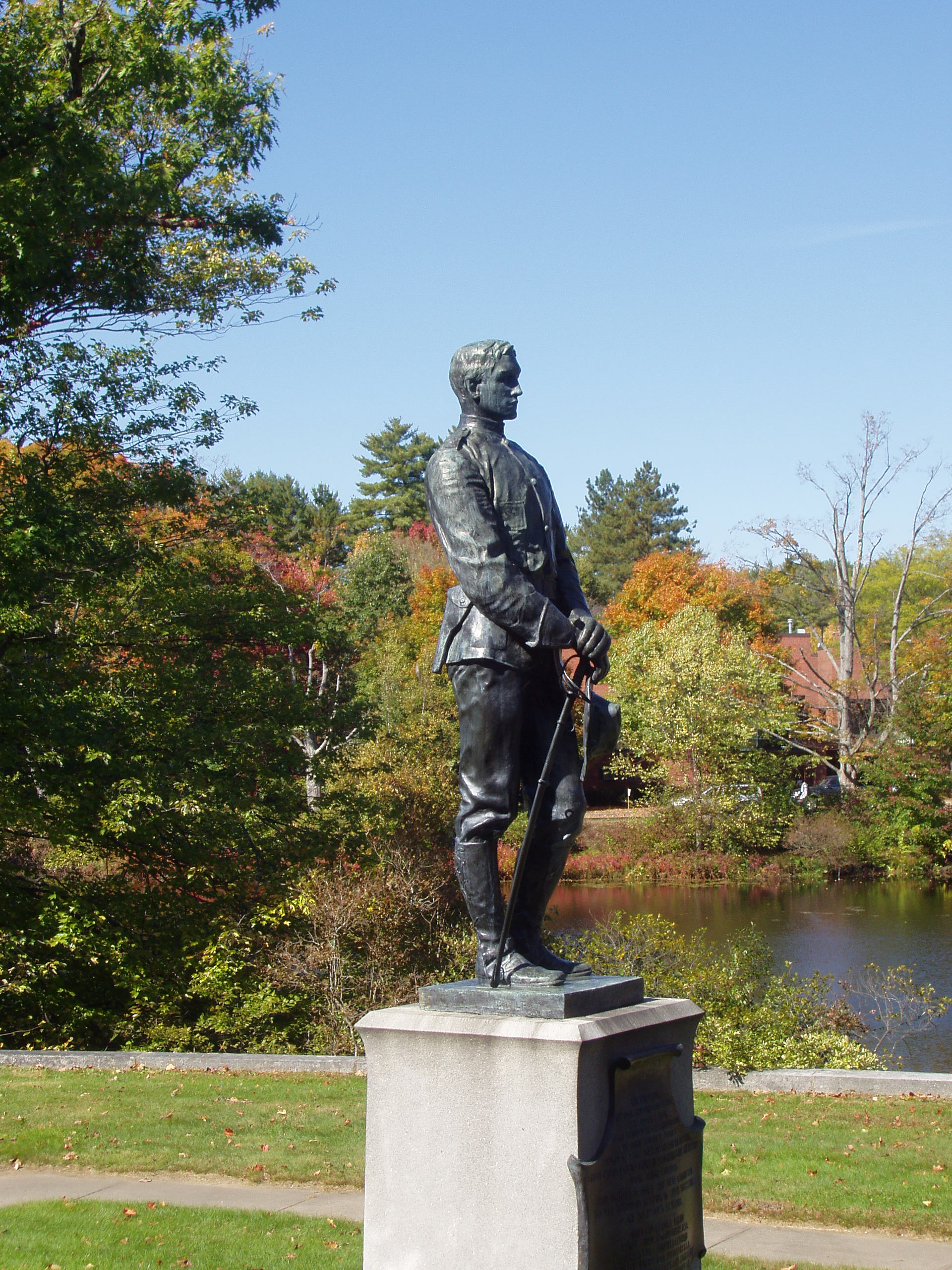
Young Soldier (1906), St. Paul's School, Concord, New Hampshire

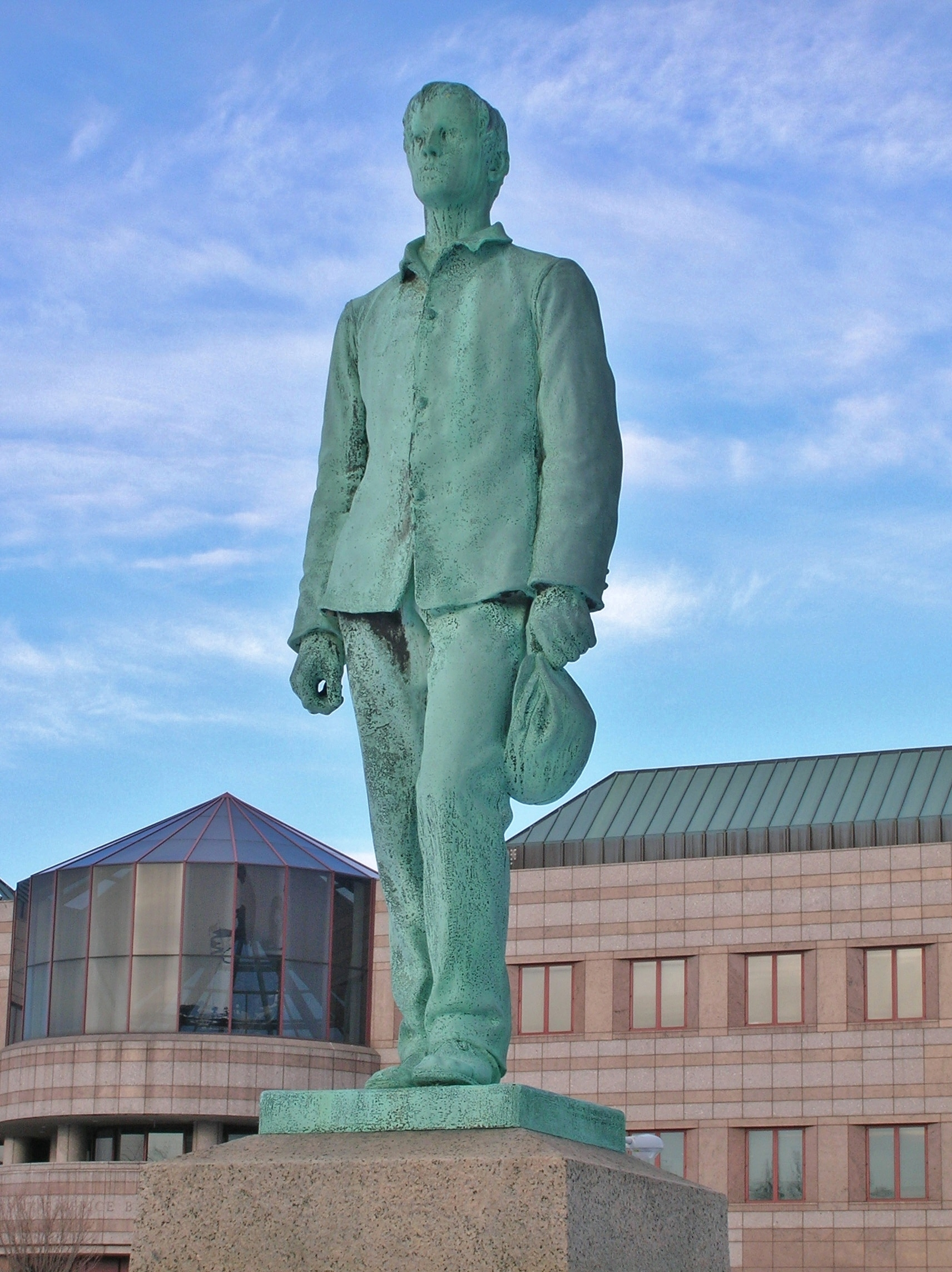
Andersonville Boy (1907), State Capitol grounds, Hartford, Connecticut

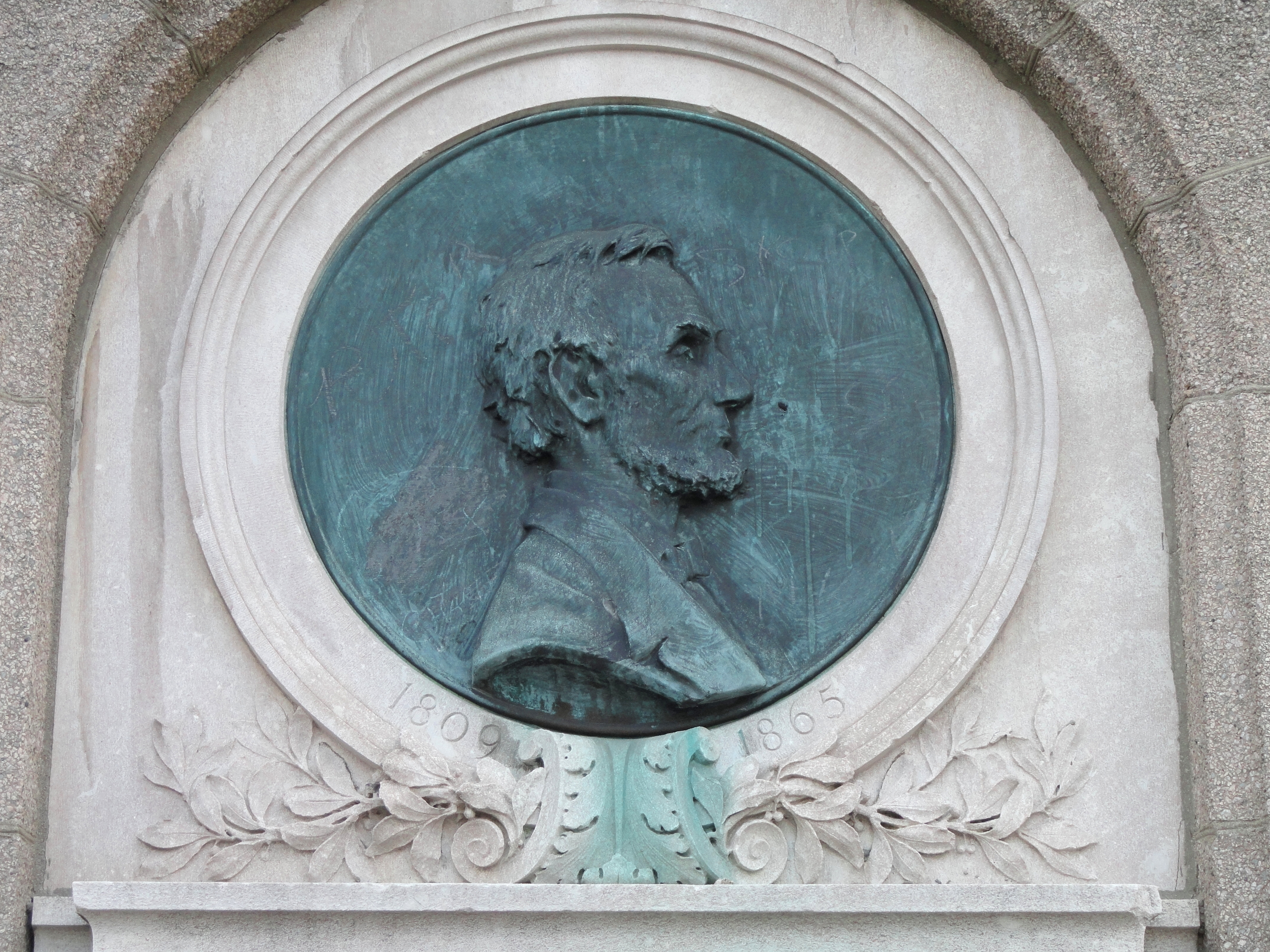
Relief Portrait of Abraham Lincoln (1908), Lowell, Massachusetts

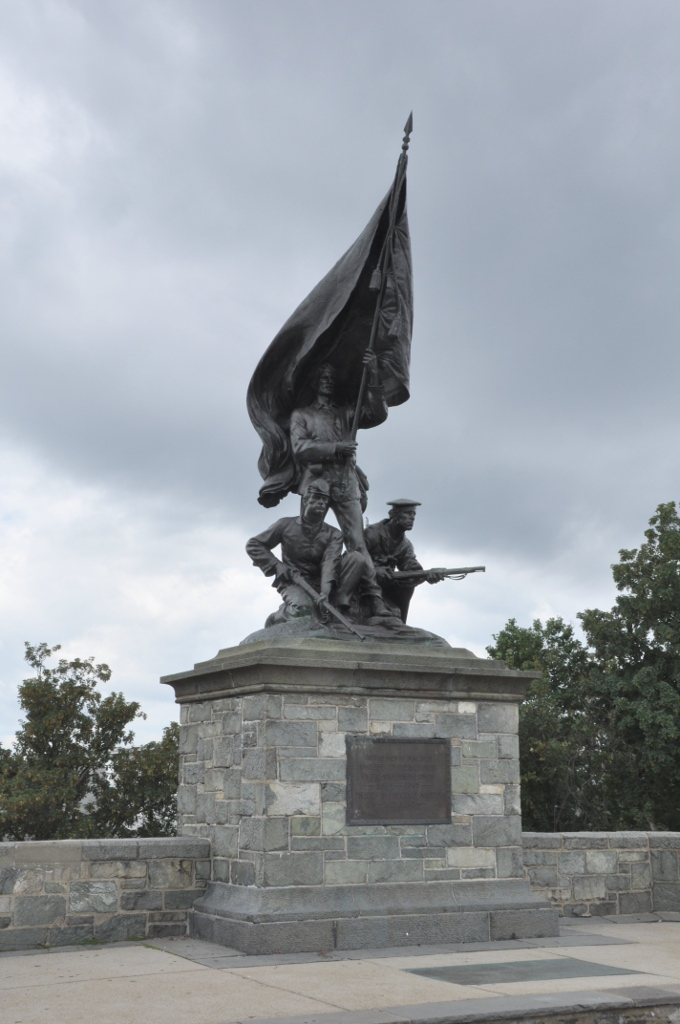
Soldiers' and Sailors' Monument (1910), Malden, Massachusetts

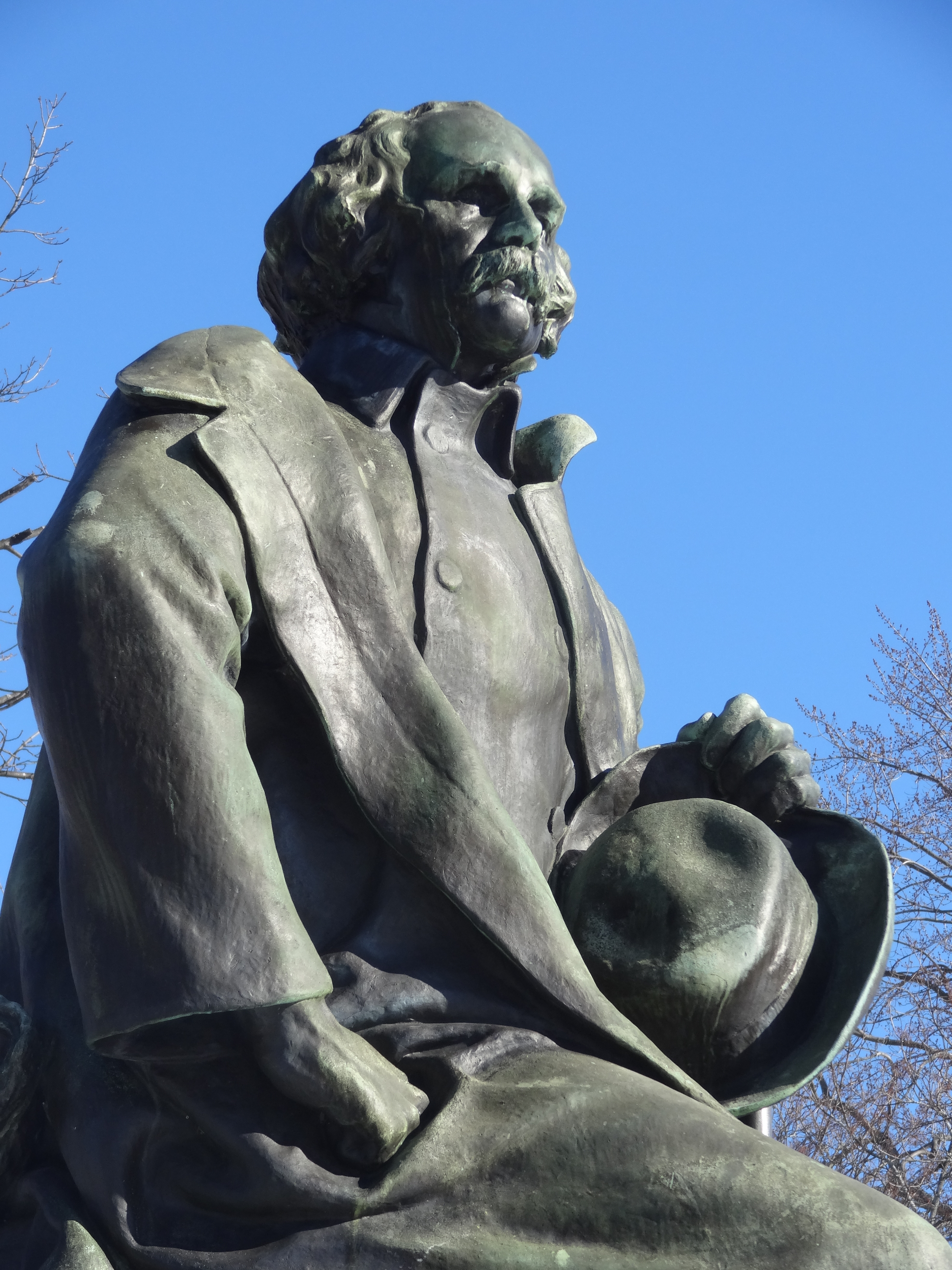
Nathaniel Hawthorne (1910), Salem, Massachusetts

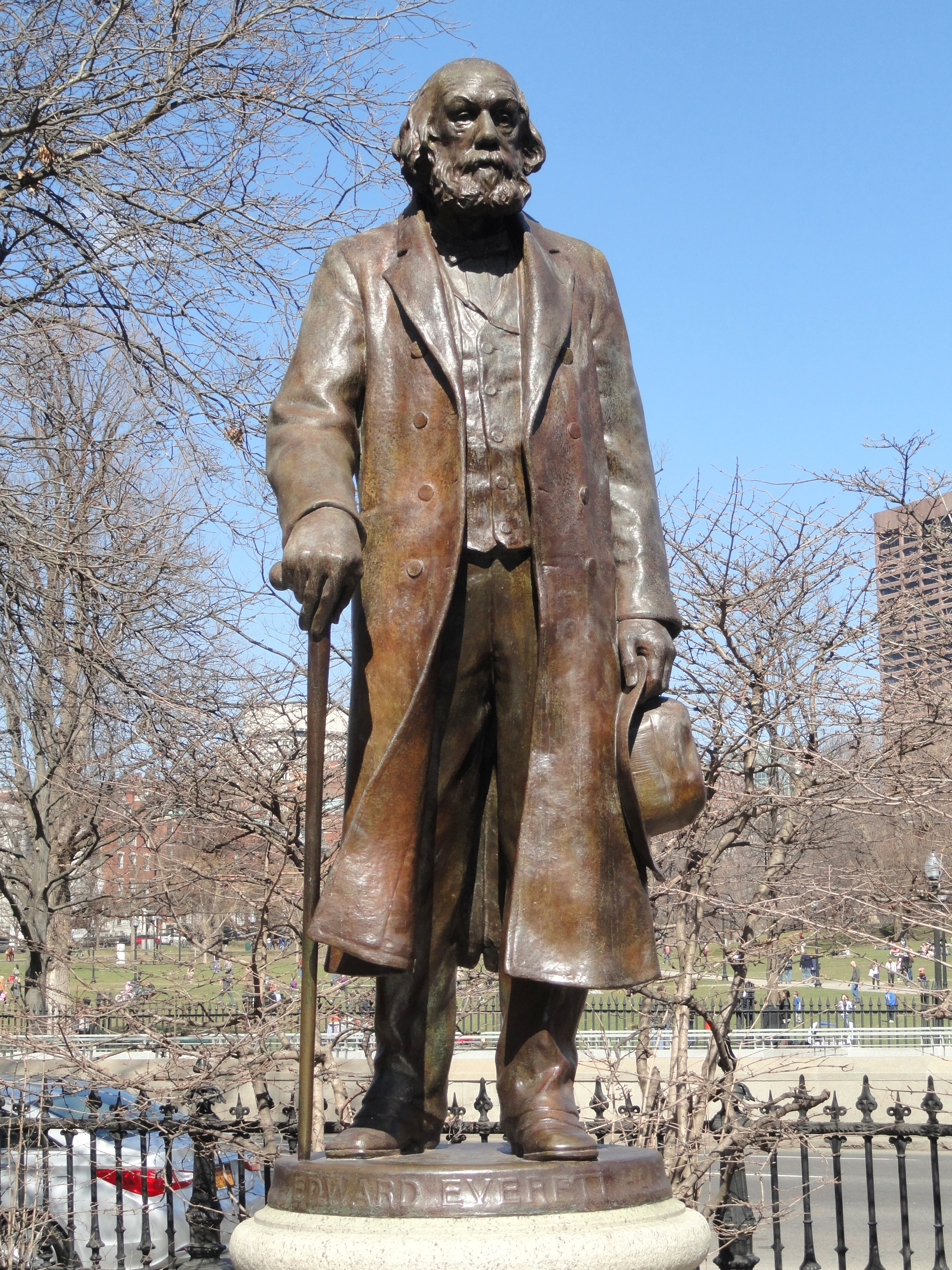
Edward Everett Hale (1913), Boston Public Garden

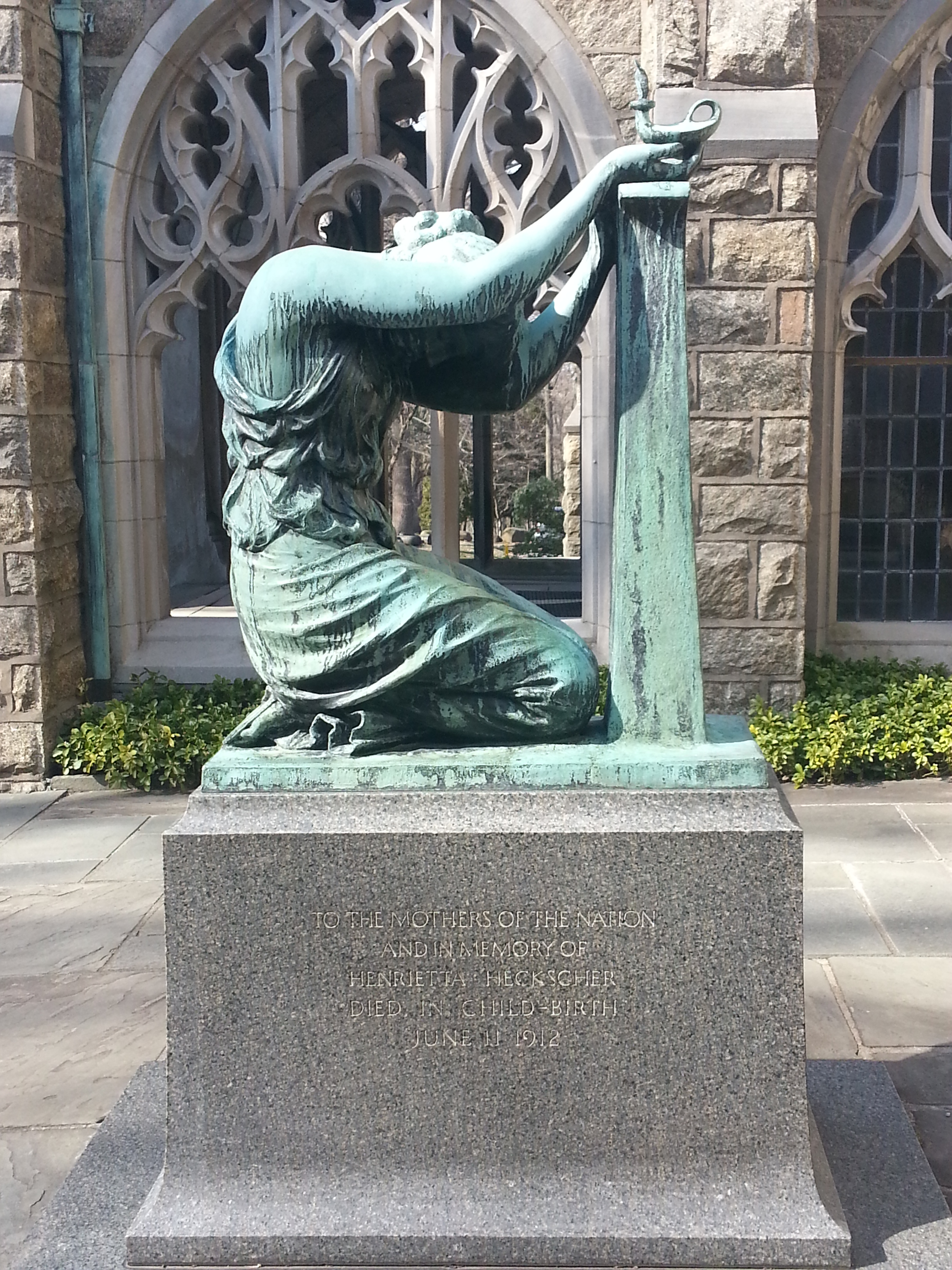
Grieving Mother (1914), Washington Memorial Chapel, Valley Forge, Pennsylvania

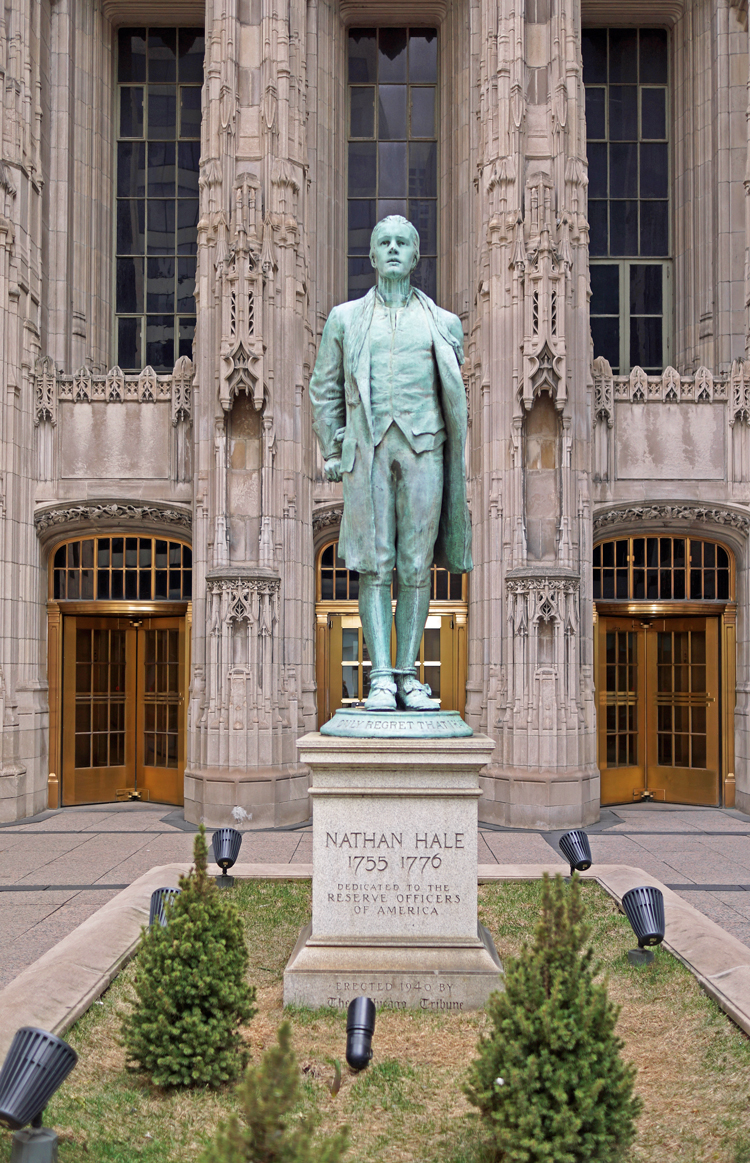
Captain Nathan Hale (1914), Chicago Tribune Building, Chicago, Illinois

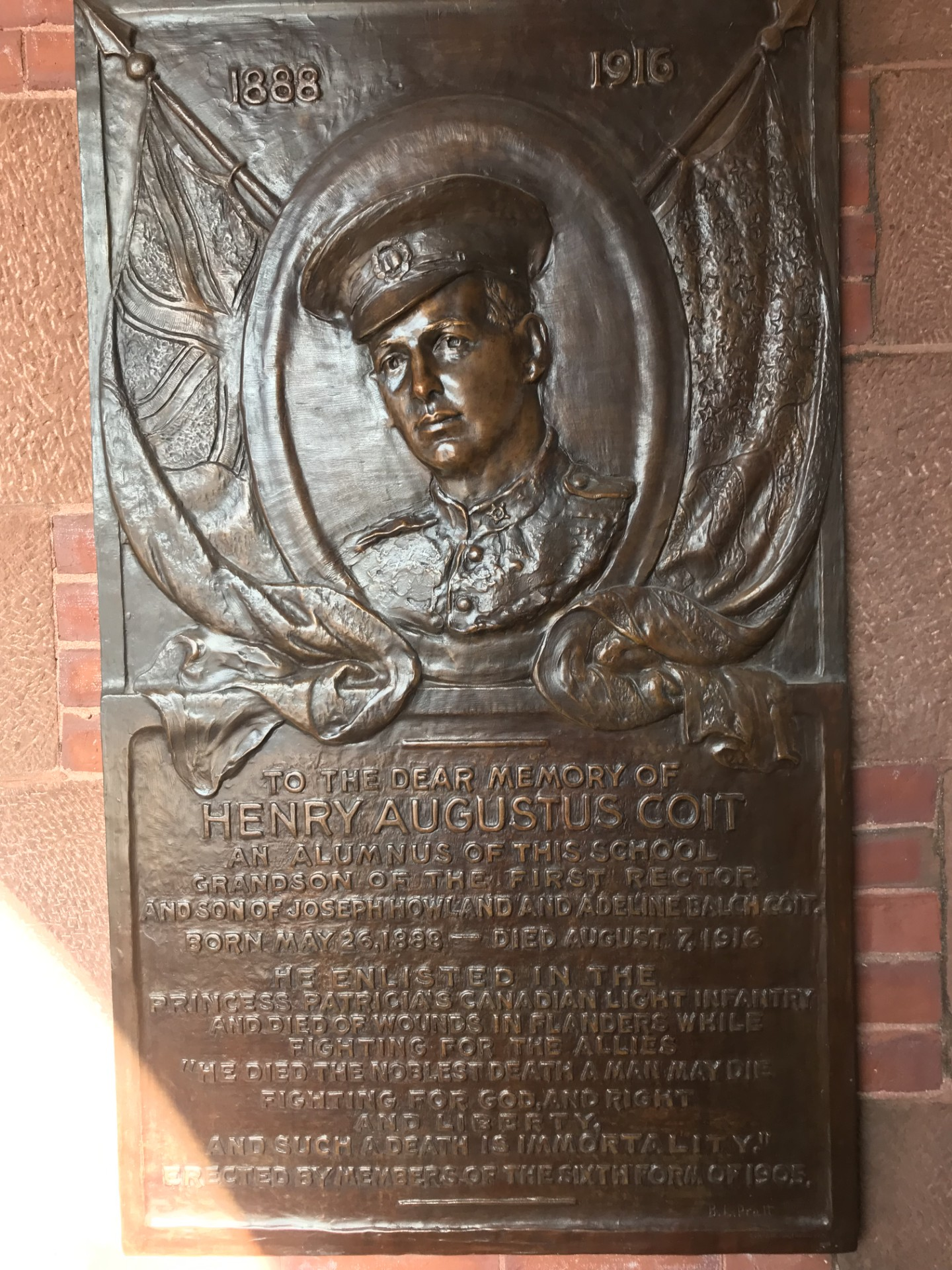
The bas relief plaque honors a student who died in World War I by Bela Pratt at St. Paul's School in Concord, NH

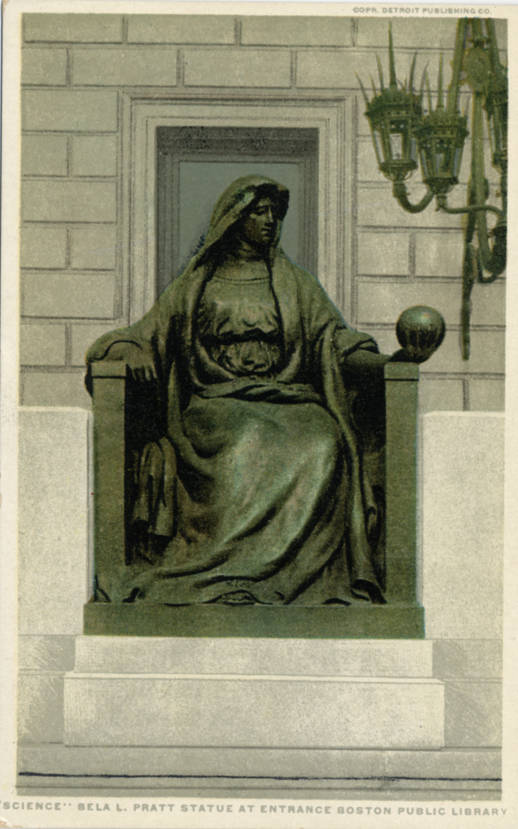
Boston_Public_Library,_Science_Bela_L_Pratt_Statue_at_Entrance_(NBY_21577)

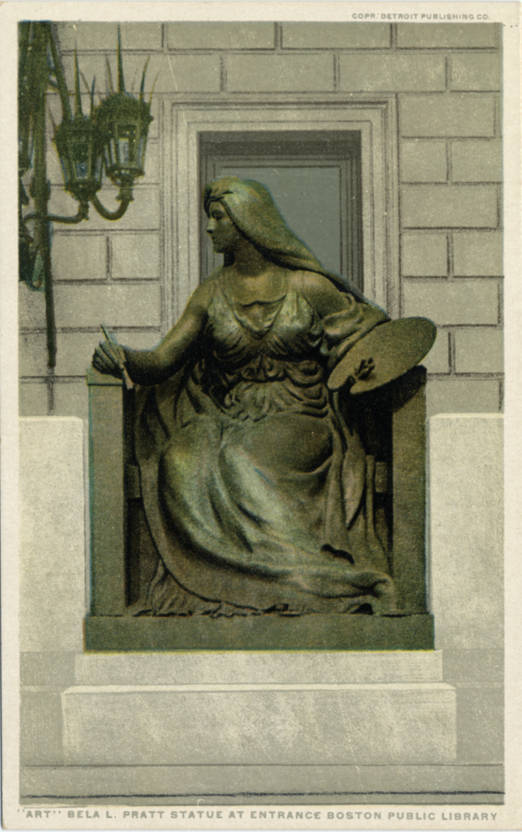
Art_Bela_L_Pratt_Statue_at_Entrance_Boston_Public_Library_(NBY_21244)

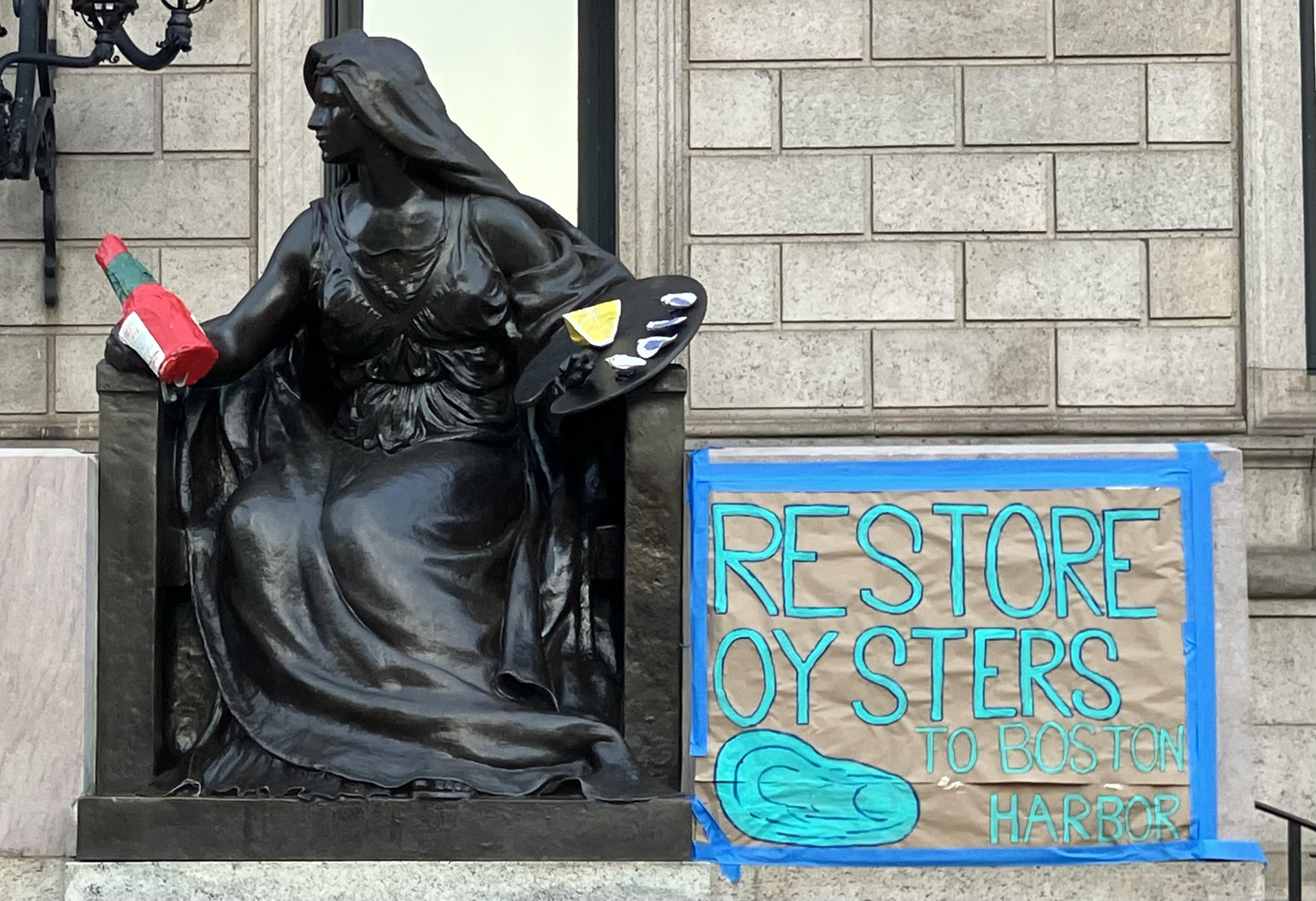
Oyster server adaptation of Bela Pratt's Art Sculpture featuring Tabasco Sauce, lemon and oysters on the half shell.
