= Beaver Country Day School =

Prep school in Chestnut Hill, Massachusetts, US

Coordinates: 42.31838°N 71.16444°W

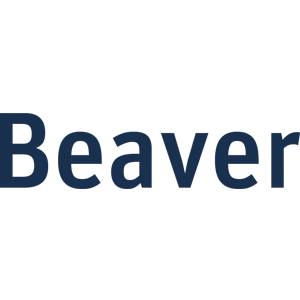
- Chestnut Hill, Massachusetts; United States

Information
- Type: Independent
- Motto: Mente et Manu (With Mind and Hand)
- Established: 1920
- Interim Head of School: Sarah Pelmas
- Faculty: 130
- Enrollment: 491
- Average class size: 15
- Student to teacher ratio: 4:1
- Campus: 17 acres (69,000 m^{2})
- Colors: Blue and gray
- Athletics: 18 sports
- Athletics conference: Eastern Independent League (EIL)
- Mascot: Beaver
- Publication: The Heliconian (literary journal)
- Newspaper: The Beaver Reader
- Yearbook: The Beaver Log
- Tuition: $65,490 (2025-2026)
- Website: www.bcdschool.org

Beaver Country Day School is an independent, college-preparatory day school for students in grades 6 through 12, founded in 1920. The school is located on a 17-acre (69,000 m^{2}) campus in the village of Chestnut Hill, Massachusetts, near Boston. Beaver is a member of the Cum Laude Society, the Independent Curriculum Group, and the National Association of Independent Schools. Beaver is accredited by the New England Association of Schools.

== History ==
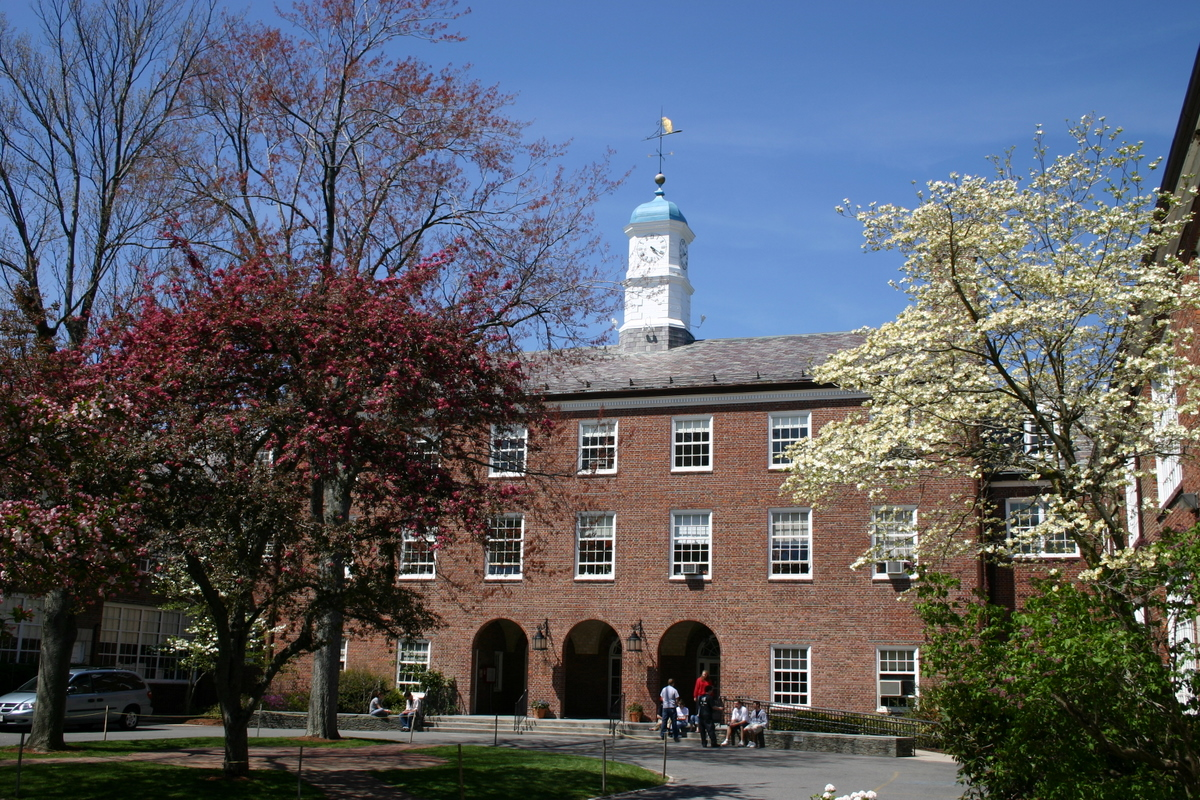
Beaver's Main Building

Beaver was incorporated as an elementary school and an all-girls high school in 1920 by a group of parents who were interested in progressive education and the Country Day School movement.

The school was named in Boston, where some of the founders had been involved with a school for younger children, later referred to as "Little Beaver."

The school's name is loosely related to the Boston Tea Party. The brig Beaver was one of the three ships involved in the Boston Tea Party. A pier near Beacon Hill was later named after the ship. The pier became a street, Beaver Place, after the Back Bay landfill effort. The original school was founded on Beaver Place in 1920, and later moved to Brookline, MA, while still retaining the name Beaver.

Beaver's first school principal was Eugene Randolph Smith, a progressive educator and a follower of the educational reformer John Dewey; Smith had previously been head of the Park School of Baltimore. The school opened in a facility in Brookline and moved to the present Chestnut Hill campus in the mid-1920s. Crosby Hodgman succeeded Smith as headmaster in 1943 and led the school until 1967 when Donald Nickerson became head. Nickerson resigned in 1973 and was succeeded by Philip E. McCurdy. McCurdy's successor, Jerome B. Martin led the school from 1985 until 1992, when Peter R. Hutton took over. Peter Hutton stepped down in June 2020, and Kim Samson succeeded him as Head of School. After five years in the role, Samson retired in June 2025, and Sarah Pelmas is now serving as Interim Head of School.

From the 1930s into the early 1940s, Beaver was part of the Eight-Year Study, an educational experiment to test the efficacy of progressive education. The school adopted coeducation in 1971.

Painter Beatrice Van Ness founded the art department at the school in 1921 and remained on the faculty until 1949.

== Students ==
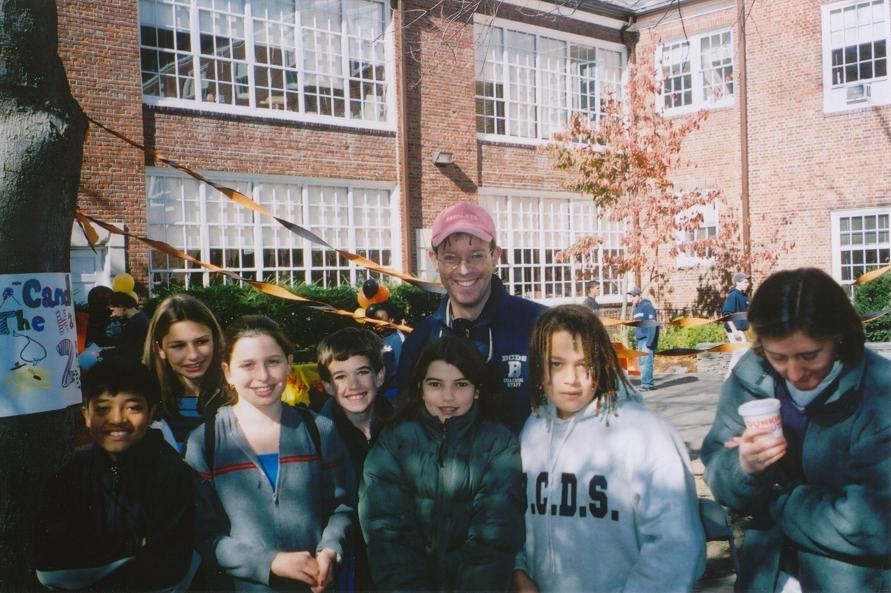
Students and teachers at the fall Harvest Fest

Beaver offers grades 6 through 12. Enrollment (2019-2020) is 491 students, of whom 355 are in the upper school (grades 9–12) and about 136 are in the middle school (grades 6–8). Classes average about 15 students; one hundred percent of Beaver graduates go on to four-year colleges and universities. The school community is diverse, with students coming from over 60 towns in the metropolitan Boston area and speaking 20 languages besides English at home. About 25% of students and 25% of faculty are people of color. Twenty-five percent of students receive financial aid. Tuition for the 2025–2026 academic year for all grades was $65,490.

Beaver is a part of the Eastern Independent League and fields interscholastic teams in sailing, soccer, field hockey, golf, cross country, basketball, fencing, volleyball, wrestling, squash, baseball, softball, tennis, ultimate, and lacrosse. In the winter of 2011–2012, Beaver started competing in girls' ice hockey. In 2015–2016, the school added boys' ice hockey as a part of their athletic program. In 2018, the school added co-ed sailing as well.

== Notable alumni ==
- Tenley Albright, physician and, winner of the 1956 Olympic gold medal in Ladies' Figure Skating
- Jane Alexander, stage and film actor and former chair of the National Endowment of the Arts
- Carol Beckwith, photographer, artist, and co-author (with Angela Fisher) of Maasai, African Ceremonies (2 vols.), African Ark, Nomads of Niger, and Passages, and winner of awards from Explorers Club, UN, and Royal Geographical Society of London.
- Eliza Dushku, an actress most noted for her roles as Faith in Buffy the Vampire Slayer and Angel and as Echo in Dollhouse(attended)
- Brad Falchuk, co-creator, executive producer, writer, and director of Glee; co-creator, executive producer, and writer of "American Horror Story;" writer of Nip\Tuck
- Jeffrey Finn, Broadway producer, nominated for the 2005 Tony Award for Best Revival of a Play for On Golden Pond
- Lucinda Franks, journalist, and winner of a Pulitzer Prize
- Temple Grandin, created a humane cow slaughtering device. Also noted for overcoming the barriers of her autism.
- Joyce Ballou Gregorian, 1963, author
- Tammy Grimes, stage and film actress who originated the title role in The Unsinkable Molly Brown on Broadway
- Fanny Howe and Susan Howe, poets, and sisters
- Jan Miner, a stage actress who gained fame as Madge, the manicurist in Palmolive television ads
- Matt Selman, writer, and producer for The Simpsons
- Wayne Turner, former University of Kentucky basketball star and professional basketball player
- Zachary Herivaux, soccer player for Rhode Island FC
- Sammy Adams, rapper, singer, songwriter
