= Richard Henry Recchia =

American sculptor

Richard Henry Recchia (November 20, 1885 - August 17, 1983) was an American sculptor.

Recchia was born in Quincy, Massachusetts, with the given name Ricardo; his father was a marble carver who had worked for Bela Pratt and Daniel Chester French. He studied from 1904-1907 in the School of the Museum of Fine Arts, Boston, and served as assistant to his teacher, Bela Pratt, until 1917. His first major commission was a set of allegorical panels representing architecture for the exterior of the Museum of Fine Arts, Boston. In 1915, he won medals for several works exhibited at San Francisco's Panama-Pacific Exposition. Recchia was a founder of the Boston Society of Sculptors, a charter member of the Guild of Boston Artists, and a member of the National Sculpture Society and Rockport Art Association. He won the Elizabeth N. Watrous Gold Medal for Sculpture in 1944. During the same year, he sculpted the Inspiration and Aspiration medal for the Society of Medalists. He died in Rockport, Massachusetts, where he is buried under his self-sculpted tombstone at the Beech Grove Cemetery.

== Selected works ==
- Relief of Robert Brown, Brown University
- Curtis Guild bas relief, Curtis Guild Memorial Entrance to the Boston Common
- Baby and Frog, Brookgreen Gardens, South Carolina, 1923
- Mother Goose, Rockport (Massachusetts) Carnegie Library, 1938
- Inspiration - Aspiration, medal, 1944
- Young Pan Playing a Flute, 1956
