= Army Nurses Memorial =

Sculpture in Boston, Massachusetts, U.S.

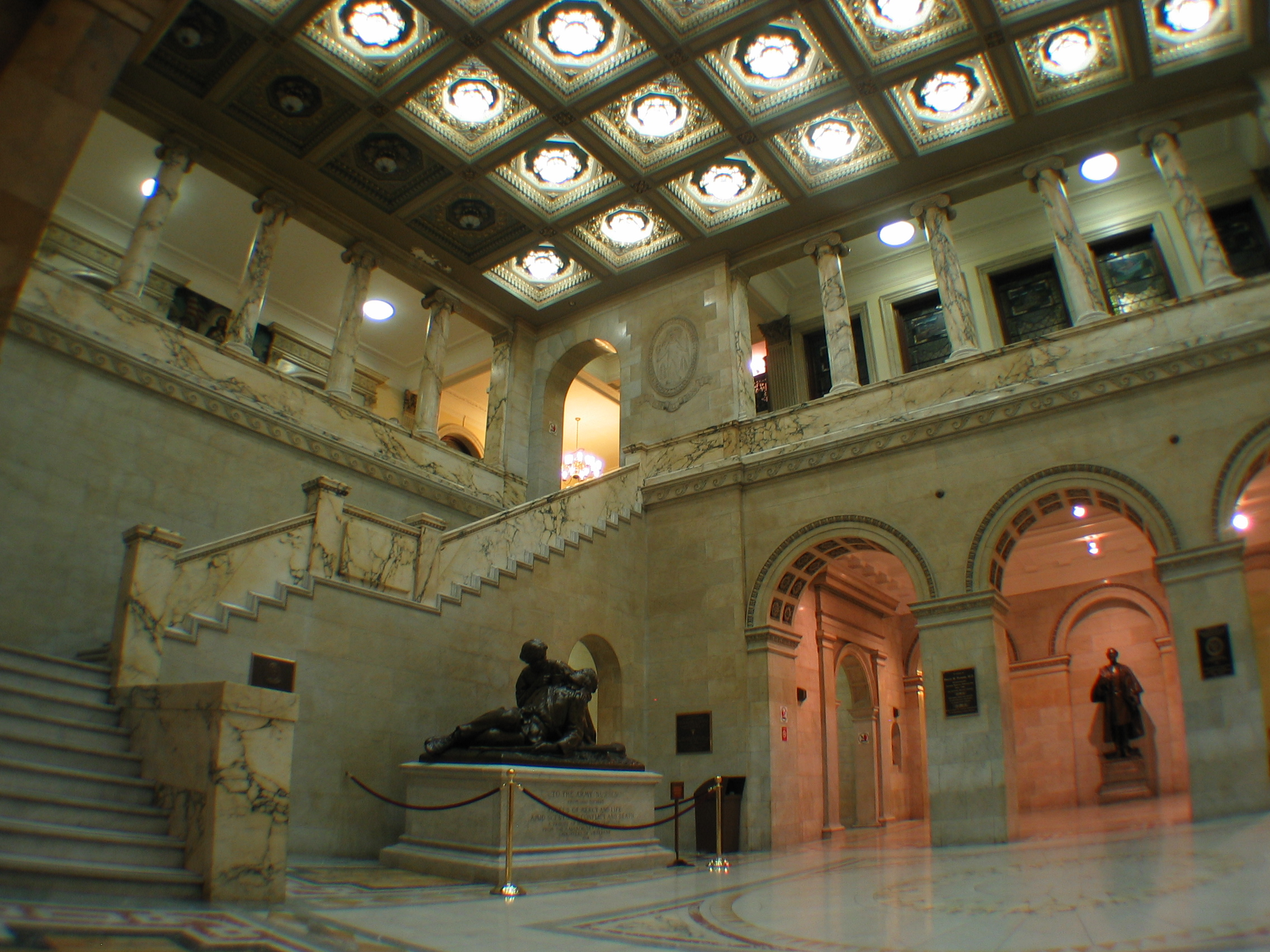
- The memorial in 2005
- Artist: Bela Pratt
- Medium: Bronze sculpture
- Subject: Nurse and soldier
- Dimensions: 240 cm (94 in)
- Location: Massachusetts State House, Boston, Massachusetts, U.S.
- 42°21′29.4″N 71°3′49.3″W

The Army Nurses Memorial by Bela Pratt is installed at the Massachusetts State House, in Boston, Massachusetts, United States.

== Description and history ==
The bronze sculpture depicts a nurse offering water to a soldier and rests on a granite base. The memorial is approximately 8 feet (2.4 m) tall. An inscription on the front of the base reads: TO THE ARMY NURSES / FROM 1861 TO 1865 / ANGELS OF MERCY AND LIFE / AMID SCENES OF CONFLICT AND DEATH / A TRIBUTE OF HONOR AND GRATITUDE / FROM THE MASSACHUSETTS DEPARTMENT / DAUGHTERS OF VETERANS / 1914.
