= Beatrice Van Ness =

American painter

Beatrice Whitney Van Ness (1888–1981) was an American painter.

Born Beatrice Whitney in Chelsea, Massachusetts, Van Ness grew up in Hyde Park, Massachusetts. She entered the School of the Museum of Fine Arts, Boston in 1905 where she studied with Frank Weston Benson, Bela Lyon Pratt, Philip Hale, and Edmund Charles Tarbell, among others. Formerly a pupil at the School of the Museum of Fine Arts, Boston, she received a scholarship from that organization in 1908 and joined its faculty two years later. Around 1909 she took summer classes with Charles H. Woodbury, who would go on to become a mentor for many years. Whitney had an early success with Odalisque, shown at the National Academy of Design in 1914, which won awards both there and at the Panama–Pacific International Exposition and was later bought by William Merritt Chase. In 1921 she founded the art department of Beaver Country Day School in Chestnut Hill, remaining on its faculty until 1949 and studying the application of child and adolescent behavior to education practice. She married businessman Carl N. Van Ness in 1915, and with him summered in Ogunquit and North Haven, Maine; the couple had two daughters. he continued to work closely with Benson when in Maine Van Ness died in Brookline, Massachusetts.

One of her paintings, Summer Sunlight (1936), depicts an intimate, domestic scene that most likely occurred in her life at her island home in Bartlett Harbor in North Haven, Maine when they spent the summer there. The painting depicts her older daughter who is in the center wearing a large hat, her nephew Winthrop Stearns who has his back to the viewer and her neighbor, Barbra Allen who has a yellow banana in her hand. The subject of the painting, however, is the bright sunlight that pervades throughout the painting. in regards to the composition, forms are echoed throughout. A shard of yellow that cuts into the rim of the umbrella is echoed in the shard of cloud that cuts into the same umbrella and is repeated in the barely visible triangular sail. The blue in Allen's bathing suit is repeated in a brighter tone in the triangle of oceanic blue at the upper left corner. The brown umbrella support serves as an anchor to the composition and also isolates the young man from the women's half of the painting. The ascending progression of heads from right to left and the parallel diagonal of the edge of the umbrella are the most pronounced diagonals that give the scene motion.

Another of her paintings, Woman in Bathing Suit (1930), is a painting of a female figure in a landscape. It is the basis in the 1920s and 30s of the Boston School varying their compositions of American Impressionism by modernizing them in regards to design and attitude. Van Ness retained the outdoor, sunlit figure with a bright palette that was found in American Impressionism, with her friend and teacher Frank Benson for example, while decreasing descriptive detail, representational volume and the emotional engagement of the viewer in order to experiment more with design and color. The intense, brilliant, vibrating colors is matched by the simple structure of the large schematic shapes. This creates an effect of chromatic lushness, a mesh of yellows, blues, and purples that are jolted by the stripe of red wandering through the bottom of the canvas.

The Beaver Country Day School has founded the Beatrice Van Ness Society in the painter's memory, and her papers are held by the Archives of American Art. A portrait by her of Bela Lyon Pratt is in the collection of the National Academy of Design. Van Ness's work is also owned by the National Museum of Women in the Arts which held a retrospective exhibition Beatrice Whitney Van Ness 1888-1981: The privilege of learning to paint from June 29 to August 2, 1987.
