= Bell Rock Memorial Park =

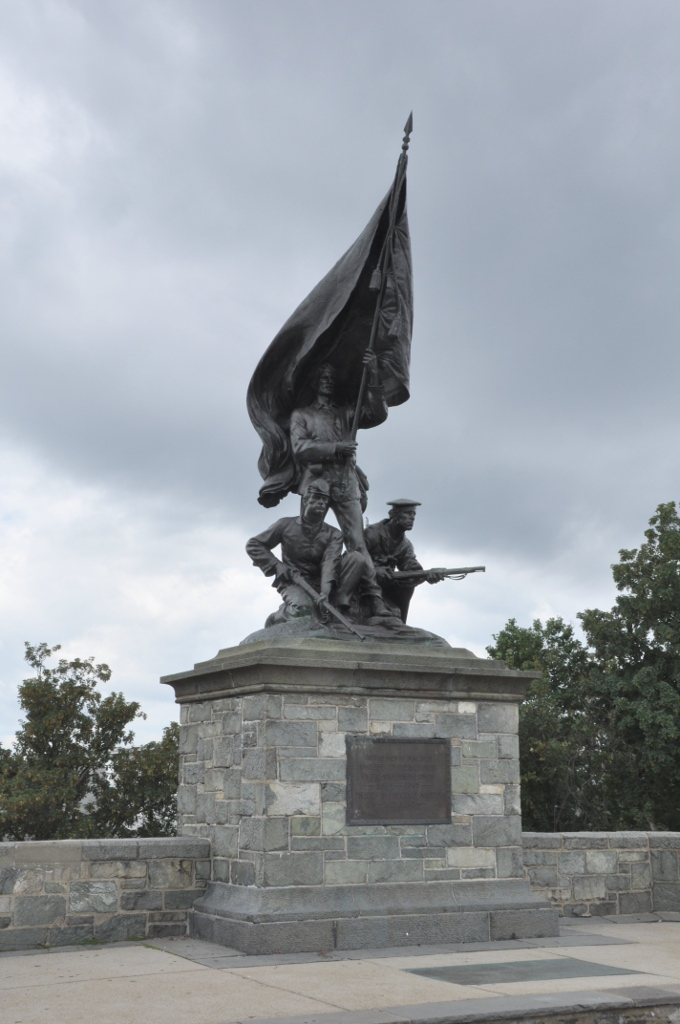
- The Civil War Memorial

- Location within Massachusetts Location within the United States
- 42°25′13″N 71°4′4″W
- Location: Malden, Massachusetts

History
- Built: 1910

Site notes
- Area: 3.41 acres (1.38 ha)
- Architect(s): Olmsted, Frederick Law Jr.
- Governing body: City of Malden

Bell Rock Memorial Park is a public park between Main, Wigglesworth, Meridan, and Ellis Streets in Malden, Massachusetts. The west side of the rock is the site of the two earliest Congregational meeting houses in Malden (First Meeting House 1649-1658 and Second Meeting House 1660-1730). The park also has an American Civil War memorial statue "The Flag Defenders" by Bela Pratt and a World War II memorial. The park was laid out in 1910 by Frederick Law Olmsted Jr. The park was listed on the National Register of Historic Places in 2001.

== History ==
The rocky outcrop that is the most prominent feature of Bell Rock Memorial Park has been an important local landmark since early colonial days. A bell was hung from scaffolding on top of the rock in 1658 to summon the faithful for worship; it is from this usage that the park derives its name. Although it was the site of Malden's first two meeting houses, the second was removed in 1727 (as was the bell), and the immediate area remained as pastureland until 1904.

In 1907 the city awarded a commission to Bela Pratt to create a sculpture commemorating the city's American Civil War soldiers. To find a site for this monument, the city engaged Frederick Law Olmsted Jr., who had been consulting for the city on the development of other parks in its system. Olmsted recommended the Bell Rock site, which was acquired by the city in 1904. Olmsted worked on the park's design from 1908 to 1917. He carefully laid out its paths to take account of the site's topography, and to provide ready views of Pratt's sculpture, which he sited at the highest point of the park. The paths were also laid out to provide a seamless connection to the neighborhood, despite the topographical challenges posed by its sometimes significant changes in elevation.

The bronze sculpture "The Flag Defenders" is composed of three figures, representing the three branches of the military at the time: Navy, Army, and Marines. One figure holds an American flag; the other two crouch and watch guard. It is mounted on a base designed by R. Clipson Sturges. In addition to this sculpture, the city has added a number of other memorials to the park. There are several plaques, commemorating the site's early history and the city's Revolutionary War soldiers, as well as larger memorials to the various conflicts the country has been involved in since the park's creation. There is also a stone and bronze tablet commemorating Michael Wigglesworth, one of Malden's leading 17th century ministers.

== See also ==
- National Register of Historic Places listings in Middlesex County, Massachusetts
