= John Henry Niemeyer =

American painter (1839–1932)

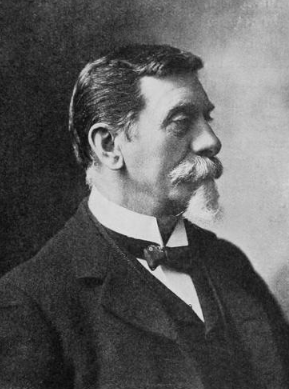
- Born: 25 June 1839; Bremen, Germany
- Died: 7 December 1932 (aged 93); New Haven, Connecticut, US
- Burial place: Grove Street Cemetery
- Education: École des Beaux Arts
- Occupation: Painter
- Employer: Yale University
- Spouse: Anna Beckman Talmage (m. 1888; died 1925)

John Henry Niemeyer (25 June 1839 – 7 December 1932) was a German-born painter who worked in the United States. He taught drawing at Yale University for over 30 years.

== Biography ==
John Henry Niemeyer was born in Bremen on 25 June 1839. He came to the United States in 1843 or 1846, residing in Cincinnati. In 1860, he was studying painting in New York City. From 1866 to 1870, he was in France where he studied in Paris under Jean-Léon Gérôme and Adolphe Yvon at the École des Beaux Arts, in the studio of Louis Jacquesson de la Chevreuse, and also in that of Sébastien-Melchior Cornu. He received three medals in the government schools of Paris.

After his studies in Europe, he was appointed in 1871 professor of drawing in the Yale School of Fine Arts, where he remained until 1908. Among his students were Augustus Saint-Gaudens and Frederic Remington.

He married Anna Beckman Talmage on 10 July 1888. She died in 1925.

Niemeyer died at his home in New Haven, Connecticut on 7 December 1932. He was buried at Grove Street Cemetery.

== Works ==
- Gutenberg inventing Movable Type (1862)
- a portrait of Theodore D. Woolsey (1876)
- The Braid
- Where?
- Why? (1880)
- Sancta Simplicitas (1882)

He also executed some bas reliefs, among them a large medallion portrait of William M. Hunt (1883) and Lilith tempting Eve (1883).
