= Gruppe =

Gruppe or Gruppé may refer to:

- Gruppe, a military term, see Glossary of German military terms
- Parliamentary group (Germany), known as Gruppe in German
- Charles Paul Gruppé (1860–1940), an American painter
- Emile Albert Gruppé (1896–1978), an American painter
- Otto Gruppe (1851–1921), German mythographer
- Otto Friedrich Gruppe (1804–1876), German philosopher, scholar-poet and philologist
