= Motif Number 1 =

Iconic building in Rockport, Massachusetts

Coordinates: 42.6592°N 70.6148°W

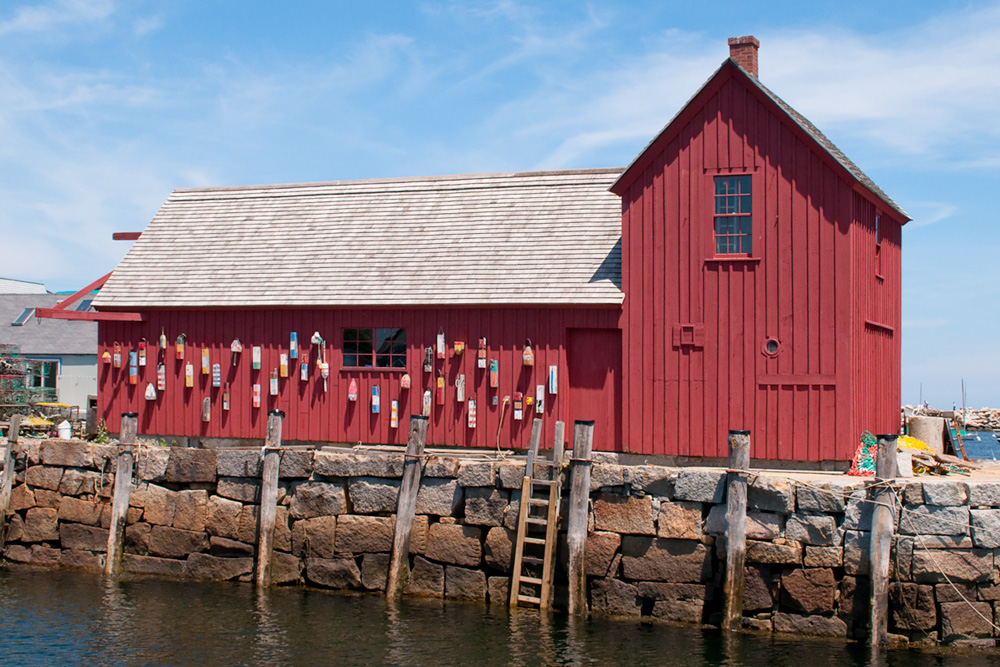
Motif Number 1 in July 2009

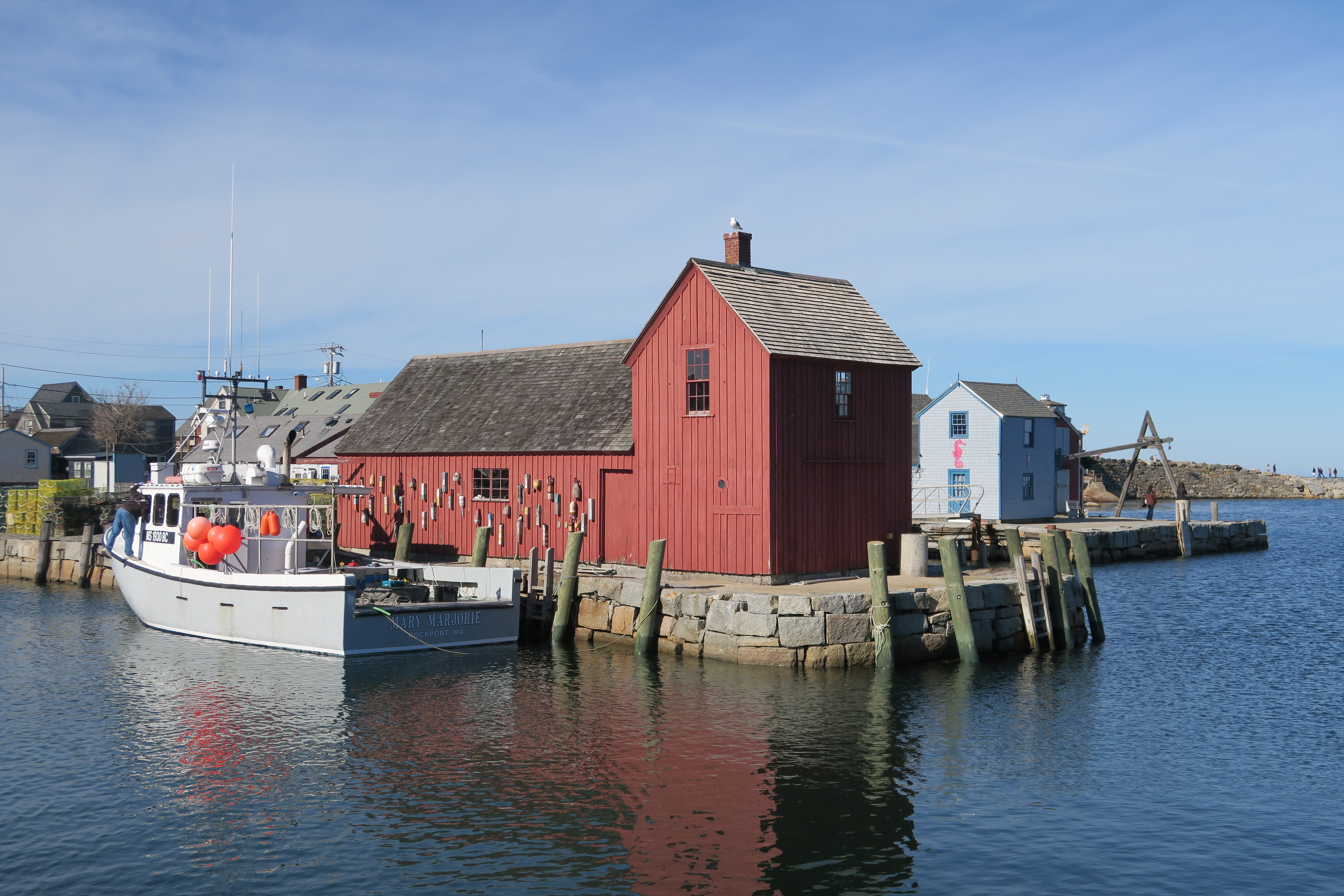
Motif Number 1 in March 2016

Motif Number 1, located on Bradley Wharf in the harbor town of Rockport, Massachusetts, is a replica of a former fishing shack well known to students of art and art history as "the most often-painted building in America." The original structure was built in 1884 and destroyed in the Blizzard of 1978, but an exact replica was constructed that same year.

Built in 1884 as Rockport was becoming home to a colony of artists and settlement of fishermen, the shack became a favorite subject of painters due to the composition and lighting of its location as well as being a symbol of New England maritime life. Painter Lester Hornby (1882–1956) is believed to be the first to call the shack "Motif Number 1," a reference to its being the favorite subject of the town's painters, and the name achieved general acceptance. It appeared in the work of Aldro Hibbard and of impressionist Harry Aiken Vincent who arrived in Rockport in 1917.

In the 1930s, painter John Buckley used the shack as his studio. He sold it to the town in 1945, which made the purchase to dedicate it "as a monument to Rockporters who had served in the Armed Services." The town, recognizing its iconic value, has taken pains to preserve both its structure and appearance, finding a red paint that appears weather-beaten even when new, and keeping the area clear of overhead wires, traffic signs and advertising.

== 1933 parade float ==
In 1933, the Rockport American Legion Post. No. 98 built a 27-foot (8.2 m) scale model of "Motif No.1" for the Legion Parade, which was held in Chicago, Illinois, site of the 1933 World's Fair. Designed by Aldro Hibbard and Anthony Thieme, with participation by the RAA, Board of Trade and townspeople "from high to low", the float was commissioned in June, completed by the end of September, and driven in daylight only, from Rockport to Chicago, in less than a week. On October 3, 1933, among 200 floats, it won first place in the float competition. Upon the float's return to Rockport, a crowd of over 4,000 lined the Great Hill (5 Corners) to welcome the float home.
