= Thieme =

Thieme may refer to:

- Thieme Medical Publishers
- Thieme-Becker, a commonly used abbreviation for the German encyclopaedia of artist biographies by Ulrich Thieme and Felix Becker.
- Anthony Thieme (1888–1954), landscape and marine painter
- Carl von Thieme (1844–1924), German banker
- David Thieme (1942–2025), American designer
- Fabien Thiémé (1952–2019), French politician
- Frank Thieme (born 1963), German yacht racer
- Hugo Paul Thieme (1870–1940), American literary critic, bibliographer and university professor
- Marianne Thieme (born 1972), Dutch animal rights activist and chairwoman of the Party for the Animals
- Paul Thieme (1905–2001), scholar of Vedic Sanskrit
- Richard Thieme (born 1944), American business consultant, author, media commentator and speaker
- Robert Thieme (1918–2009), American Christian minister
- Roberto Thieme (1942–2023), Chilean furniture maker, painter, and politician
- Thomas Thieme (born 1948), German actor
