= Ted Kautzky =

Budapest-born architect

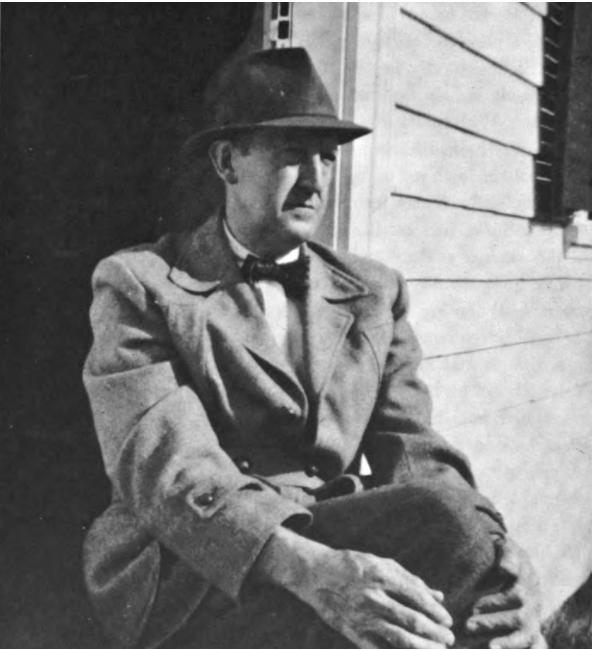
- Born: 1896; Budapest, Hungary
- Died: 1953 (aged 56–57); New York, USA
- Citizenship: United States of America
- Education: Architecture, Royal University of Budapest, 1921
- Occupations: Architect, painter, teacher
- Notable work: Pencil Broadsides (1940); Pencil Pictures (1947); Ways with Watercolor (1949); Painting Trees and Landscapes in Watercolor (1952)
- Spouse: Ruth Kautzky
- Awards: American Watercolor Society Medal of Honor (1941); Allied Artists of America, Gold Medal (1949); National Academy of Design, Obrig Prize (1952); New York Art Directors Club, Award of Distinctive Merit (1953)

Theodore Kautzky (1896–1953) was a Budapest-born architect, painter. teacher, and author of books on painting techniques. He emigrated to New York, United States in 1923.

== Early life and education ==
Kautzky was born in 1896 in Budapest, Hungary, to a family of moderate means. His father was a wrought iron designer who wanted him to follow in his trade; however, growing up near the Danube where there was a rich local and national tradition of participation in the arts and crafts had influenced him at a young age. He attended the Royal University in Budapest to study architecture, graduating from there in 1921.

=== Influence in the formative years ===
He began drawing and painting with watercolors while he was still in school. The formal education provided him with the basic instructions in drawing, but Kautzky began to spend most of his spare time in independent pursuit of art. By the time he was in high-school, he was popularly known as "that Kautzky boy who draws and paints so well in watercolor."

His interest in architecture and architectural subjects began by observing, drawing, and painting the bridges, churches, palaces, government buildings, and various types of dwellings in the twin cities of the Hungarian capital. A number of these structures were built during the Gothic and Renaissance times.

=== Early development of style ===
Kautzky began drawing with a pencil and then advanced to black-and-white tones. He then learnt the use of brushes and watercolors to create realistic pictorial effects. Early on, he made use of the many tints and hues readily available in the stores at the time, but over the years began to simplify his color palette by being selective of the color pigments he would use to match his style and temperament. He espoused the same idea of being restrictive in color mixing to his students during his career as a teacher later in his life.

== Career ==
Kautzky was employed by a prominent architect of Budapest after his graduation. His initial role at the firm was to perform minor duties and tasks in drafting, but after recognizing his talents, he was assigned to work on a final presentation rendering for a major client. His work on the project was appreciated and the client immediately approved the designs, leading to his growth in stature and responsibilities within the firm.

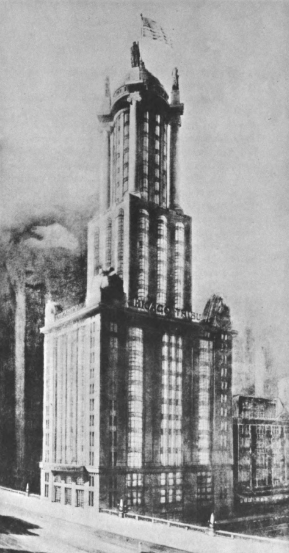
Chicago Tribune Tower design submitted by Ted Kautzky in 1922

=== Emigration to America ===
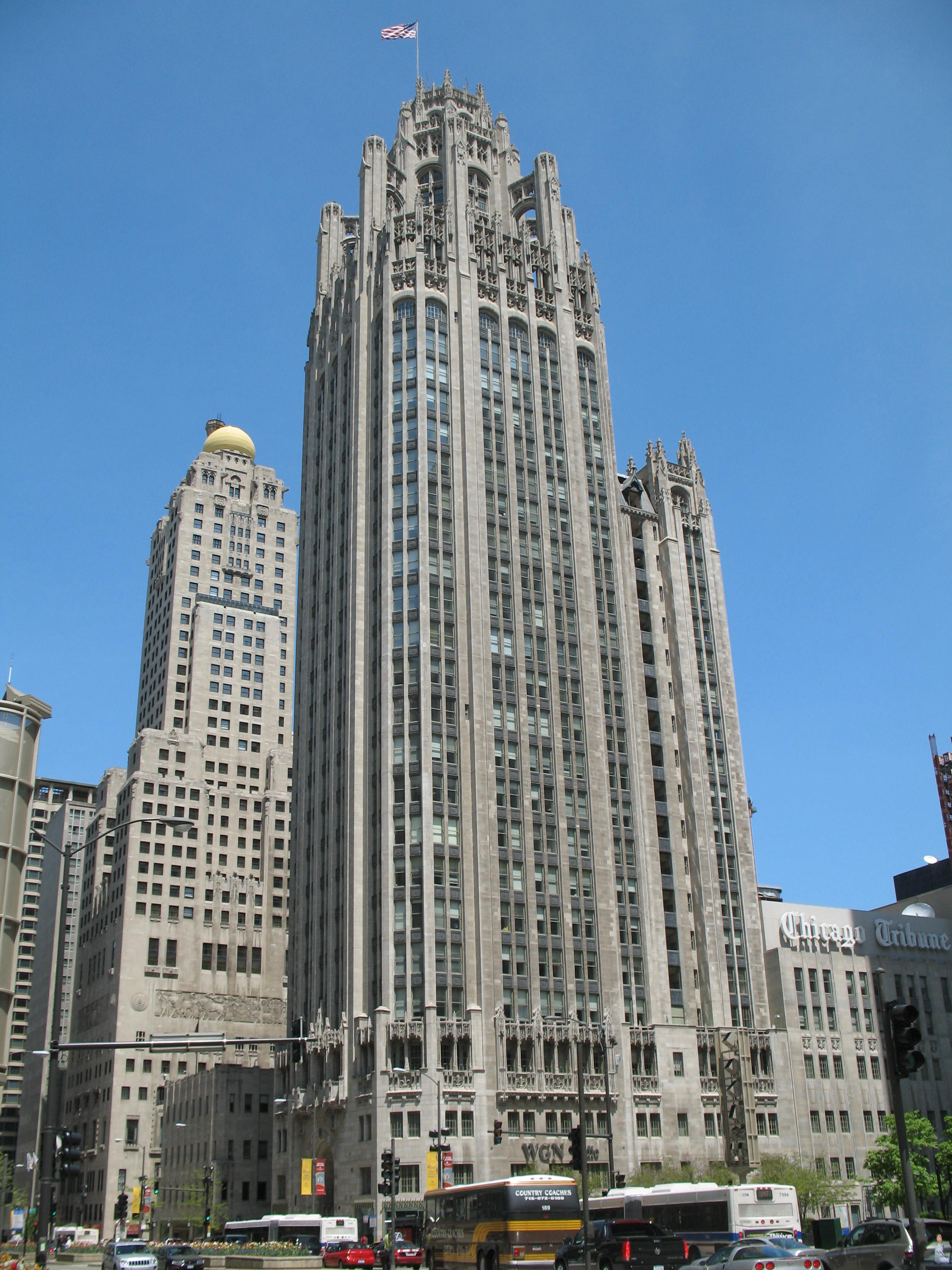
The Tribune Tower, Chicago, USA

In June 1922, the Chicago Tribune announced an international competition for architects to design their new office building, the Tribune Tower. Publishers of the Tribune, Joseph Patterson and Robert R. McCormick, designed the contest, announced a $100,000 prize to be distributed among the top architects, and asked the contenders to create "the most beautiful office building in the world."

When news of this competition reached Kautzky's office, he signed up for the opportunity to win world-wide fame and the considerable prize money. He collaborated with his associate, Lorand Lechner, who worked on their plans for the building while Kautzky focused on the exterior design and rendering.

The competition attracted 263 entries from 23 countries. While the first prize went to the American team of John Mead Howells and Raymond M. Hood, the second to the Finnish architect Eliel Saarinen and his team, and the third to Holabird & Roche - a Chicago-based architectural firm, Kautzky and Lechner won an honorable mention for their design.

Kautzky had studied many skyscrapers and other architectural designs from various cities of America. At the same time, skyscrapers were being rapidly built and developed in New York and across America, while Hungary was going through an economic depression and governmental upheaval. After much deliberation with colleagues, friends, and family, he set sail for New York in late 1923, aged 26, to explore creative opportunity in the developing New World.

=== Beginnings in New York ===
Upon finding suitable lodgings in New York, Kautzky began looking for work with the architectural firms of the city. He had learnt enough English to converse in ordinary life, but while he carried his credential, letters of recommendation, and samples of draftsmanship, the language barrier made it difficult to begin searching for work opportunities. However, as per the European custom, he went on to apply for work dressed with spats, gloves, and a cane, bowing and clicking his heels while introducing himself to the receptionist and asking to see the boss. This formality quickly earned him his first job.

Over the next year, he worked with several firms before joining the prominent theater architect, Thomas W. Lamb, for whom he soon became the Chief Designer. Kautzky worked with Lamb for the next three years working on elaborate perspectives and elevations of the popular early 20th-century theaters.

=== Motion picture industry ===
The mid 1920s witnessed a boom in the motion picture industry and movie theaters were fast-becoming popular among audiences. Another architect, John Eberson, had begun creating illusions of being seated outdoors in exotic foreign environments for the theater audiences. He achieved this by lining his auditoriums with scenes and buildings of famous tourist places, made with plaster and stucco replicas with staged lighting on them and night sky painted on the ceiling above, giving audiences the effect that they are actually outdoors. Many large-scale distributor-exhibitor chains began incorporating this architectural style in their auditoriums in the late 1920s.

Kautzky was convinced to join Eberson's company as a Chief Designer, a role he maintained for the next six years. This allowed him to conduct intensive research on historic buildings and their architectural style, and then be creative with re imagining the old material applying pictorial composition techniques to three dimensional designs. His experience with this company was reflected in his later work as an architect and a painter.

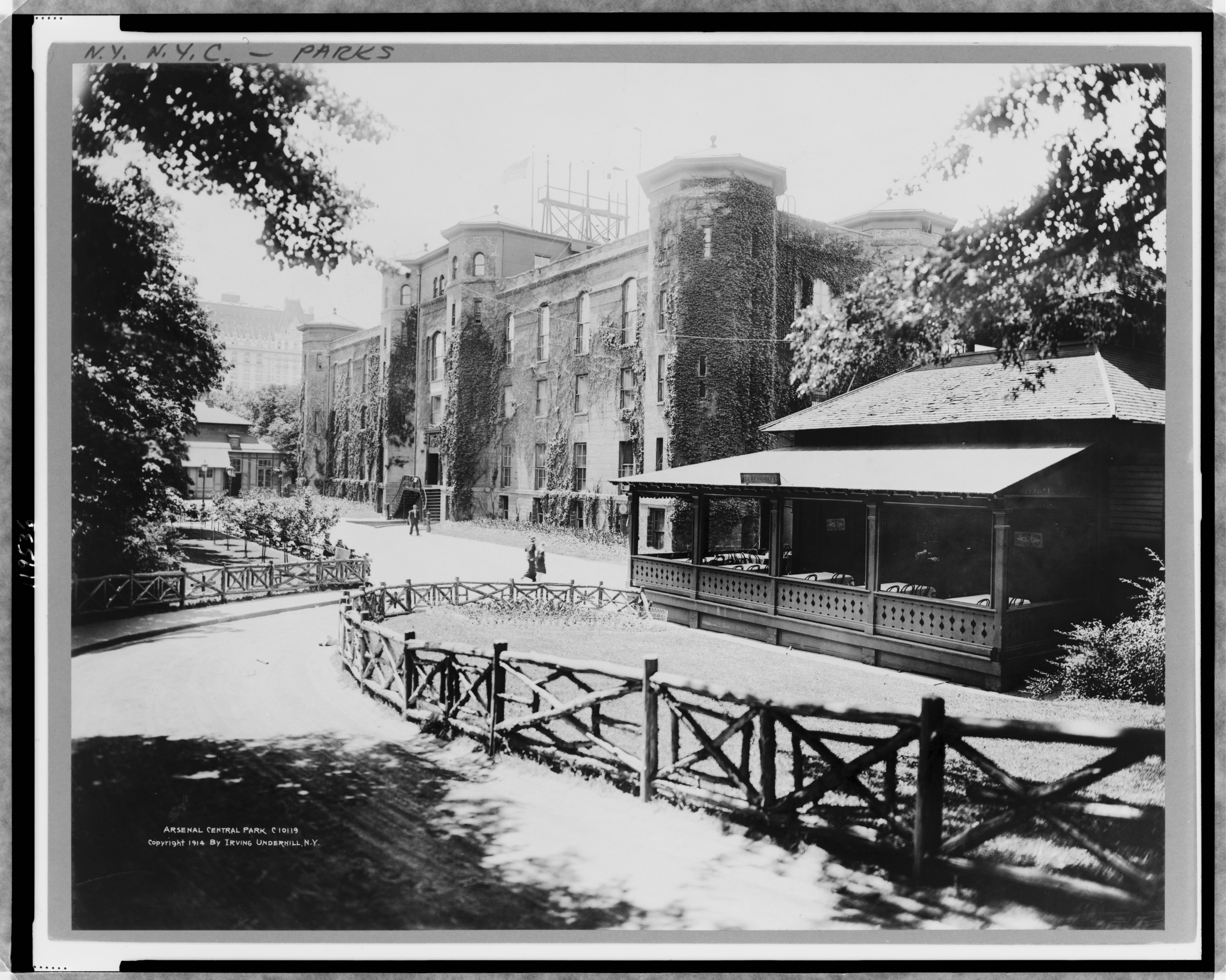
The Arsenal, Central Park, New York. Photographed by Irving Underhill in 1960.

=== Great Crash of 1929 ===
In 1929, the New York stock market crashed, the event known as the Wall Street Crash or the Great Crash. It signaled the onset of the Great Depression and the economic collapse of businesses and industries worldwide. The architectural and building field was slow to react, but many projects across United States came to a halt. A number of draftsmen were laid off. and those who were needed to work on projects that could not be postponed or canceled faced reductions in their salaries.

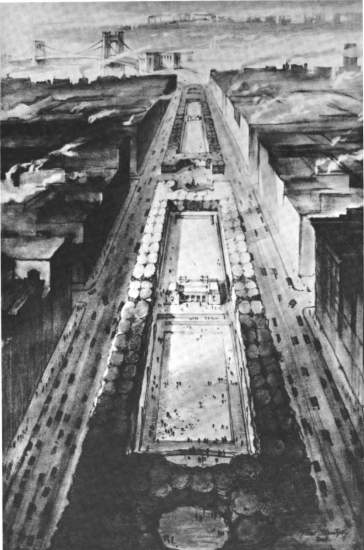
1934 rendering of the Central Park by Ted Kautzky for Department of Parks

Kautzky managed to acquire enough commissions and jobs to survive through the worsening economic depression until President Franklin D. Roosevelt's New Deal came into action. This began a series of public works projects initiated by the government and emergency committees formed by architects to provide new work opportunities. Even then, by the end of 1933-34, there was a scarcity of private architectural work and many architects found a safe haven in the jobs provided at the Arsenal in Central Park, New York.

Robert Moses, the Commissioner of Parks, had set up a drafting room to work on the City and State sanctioned park improvements. Kautzky was one of the architects who joined the project; however, work was assigned at random and he was tasked with the job to design full-size details for zoo building for Central Park.

Kautzky was dismayed by the kind of work he was assigned to do and made regular protests to the Park officials. He wanted to work on renderings. An opportunity came in 1934 when Moses called in one morning at 10 AM and demanded a 30" x 20" charcoal rendering of a bird's eye view of the Park's development ready by 5 AM the same day to be published in the newspaper. The drafting room chief, Joe Hautman, recalled the protests and claims made by Kautzky and assigned him the task, which he finished promptly much to the pleasure of the Commissioner.

The publication of his first rendering for the Department of Parks in 1934 became a turning point for Kautzky. He was assigned most of the delineation renderings for the department until he left it in 1937. Even thereafter, the Commissioner, his architects and engineers continued to give him special commissions for many of the public projects, including parks, tunnels, bridges, housing, and other structures. Since almost all of these renderings were published in local newspapers and national magazines, Kautzky began to gain countrywide recognition for his work for the first time.

=== Freelance work ===
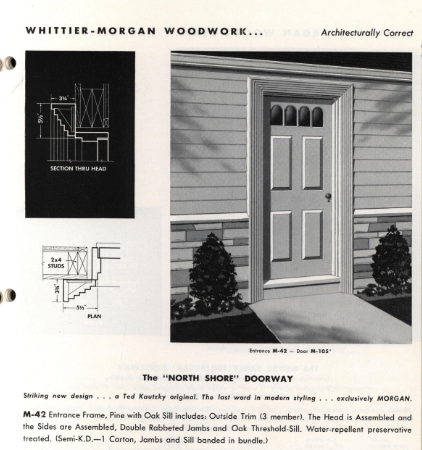
Door and frame design for Whittier Lumber & Millwork Company by Ted Kautzky, published in the Whittier Woodwork catalog no. 460

Soon after leaving the Department of Parks in 1937, Kautzky set up a freelance studio on the 57th street in Manhattan. He had acquired considerable fame and recognition among architects and advertisers of building products to consistently receive special commissions for rendering a number of public and private architectural projects.

Some of the notable freelance work done by Kautzky includes an extended series of renderings for the greenhouses manufacturing firm Lord & Burnham, a series of Christmas cards depicting houses in and around Irvington-on-Hudson also for Lord & Burnham, and renderings of buildings for the Overhead Door Corporation of Indiana. He also worked on the designs of doorways, staircases, railings, and other items of architectural millwork for the advertisements of Hussey, Williams Company.

Additionally, he was commissioned by the Manufacturers Association of New Jersey to create a pencil delineation of their building. Additionally, he was retained by consulting engineers Parsons, Brinckerhoff, Hall and Macdonald to work on a number of designs for architectural developments in New York, including the North Portal of the First Avenue tunnel at the United Nations site, the view looking west down 48th street just after crossing the North Portal of the tunnel, a proposed bridge spanning 42nd street at Tudor City, among other projects.

==== The calendar of 1953 ====
A couple of years before his demise. the Ketterlinus Lithographic Manufacturing Company gave Kautzky a special commission to paint twelve natural landscapes from across the America to be reproduced on their large 1953 calendar. He was asked to paint the different seasons typical of 12 different parts of the country, one for each month.

The amount paid to him was enough to cover the extensive journey, including all the travel costs for both him and his wife, and to compensate him for the reproduction rights of his paintings. Kautzky planned the trip with Ruth, his wife, and departed for the south and west in his Buick.

It took them several months to complete the journey of almost ten thousand miles. They covered areas in Pennsylvania, Florida, the Carolinas, Louisiana, Kansas, California, Oregon, Colorado, other states in between, and some of his personal favorite places in New England. Kautzky would look for landscapes that appealed to him, and then stop there for sketching and painting.

He spent another few months to finish his paintings, working through his notes, after returning to New York. The calendar was a major success for the company and sold several thousand copies, making Kautzky's work with watercolors and nature known in households across America.

=== Teacher and instructor ===
Kautzky wanted to impart unto others the knowledge he had gained from years of experimentation, study, and effort. To this end, he undertook individual and class instruction of the fine points of technique involved in painting and drawing. As opportunity presented, in the 1930s and onward, he began teaching at the Pratt University in New York, the University of Pennsylvania, New York University, and the University of Toronto. It led to the penmanship of four instructional books on pencil drawing, and watercolor and oil paintings.

== Exhibitions and competitions ==
Kautzky submitted his designs, renderings, and artwork for several exhibitions and competitions. The Municipal Civil Service Commission held an examination for Architectural Renderers in 1934. The participants had to draw the Triborough Bridge, about to be built back then, and Kautzky's design received 100% marks.

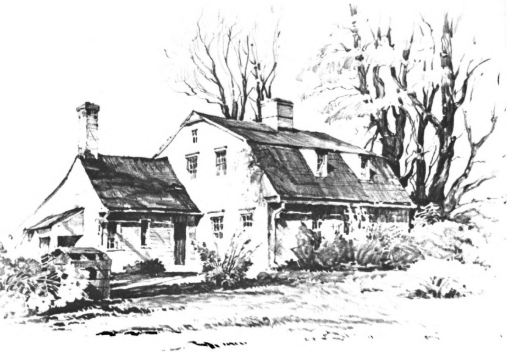
Pencil Point submission in 1935 by Ted Kautzky for which he won the first prize

In 1935, the architectural magazine Pencil Points, later called Progressive Architecture, began a monthly pencil sketch competition. Kautzky submitted three drawings and won the first prize. The editor of the magazine, Ken Reid, invited him to be the subject of a feature article for the November 1936 issue. The article covered his story, displayed a number of his drawings and renderings, and closed with the following line: "But watch his career as a watercolorist." Kautzky had not begun to seriously work on watercolor painting at this point, but he had submitted a few of his initial artworks for the magazine article. Thereafter, he became good friends with Reid, and his work was frequently published in the future editions of the magazine.

=== Awards and prizes ===
Kautzky was highly recognized for his artwork and went on to win several prominent prizes and awards throughout the rest of his life.

Year	Award
1941	American Watercolor Society Medal of Honor
1944	Salmagundi Laymember Prize
1946	Allied Artists of America, Marine Prize
1947	North Shore Arts Association Watercolor Prize
1948	Rockport Art Association Watercolor Prize
1948	Salmagundi Watercolor Prize
1949	American Watercolor Society Obrig Prize
1949	Salmagundi Club Oil Prize
1949	Baltimore Watercolor Club Prize
1949	Allied Artists of America, Gold Medal
1950	Rockport Art Association Watercolor Prize and Popular Prize
1950	Northshore Arts Association Popular Prize
1950	Hudson Valley Art Association Watercolor Prize
1951	Baltimore Watercolor Club Prize and Popular Prize
1951	American Watercolor Society Purchase Prize
1951	Rockport Art Association Watercolor Prize and Popular Prize
1952	Salmagundi Club Auction Prize and Watercolor Prize
1952	National Academy of Design, Obrig Prize
1953	New York Art Directors Club, Award of Distinctive Merit

== Publications ==
Kautzky worked on and published four books on pencil drawing and watercolors in his life. After meeting Reid, the editor of Pencil Points, the two became good friends and eventually collaborated on three books: Pencil Broadsides (1940), Pencil Pictures (1947), and Ways with Watercolor (1947). Kautzky provided the illustrations, drawings, paintings, and the corresponding technical information, while Reid wrote the text for the books. For the fourth book, Painting Trees and Landscapes in Watercolor (1952), he collaborated with Norman Kent, editor of The American Artist, as Reid had left Pencil Points and was occupied elsewhere. Kautzky's books were used for instruction in teaching during his lifetime and are still extensively used by students of watercolor painting and pencil drawing.

== Personal life ==
Kautzy eventually become conversant in the English language and began socializing with his contemporaries soon after he arrived in New York. In 1925, he met and courted Ruth Carle, whom he married in the same year a week before Christmas at the Little Church Around the Corner. The couple went on a trip to Europe for their honeymoon.

=== Home in Rockport ===
In 1941, Kautzky found a place to build a summer house for himself and his family in Rockport, Massachusetts. Here, he could enjoy proximity to the sea and paint uninterruptedly away from the distractions of his New York studio, The town had schools for young artists, held many public art exhibits, and gave him the opportunity to meet several other notable artists who worked in the vicinity.

He bought a piece of land, enough to build a small cottage, on the outskirts of the town and right by the rocky shore of Cape Ann. He worked himself on the design and construction of the house, where he eventually built his personal art studio and a guest room. Kautzky cut and installed the interior pine paneling and trim, sandpapered everything to smoothness, and proofed his cottage against weather and rodents. He used to proudly exclaim to his guests: "No mouse shall get in Kautzky's house."

He ensured that all the rooms in his Rockport cottage would have a view of the open sea. His studio windows and terrace opened out to the sea and the sky, where he spent many hours relaxing, walking, studying nature, and painting.

After moving to Rockport, Kautzky and his wife traveled each year in late fall or early winter for a few weeks to northern New England, especially Vermont, where they would meet friends and he would paint the autumn landscapes. After this trip, they would return to their Yonkers dwelling from which he commuted every day to his studio in Manhattan to work on his commercial projects.

Each year, Kautzky wanted to make enough money during his time in Yonkers to cover his expenses for the rest of the year and provide an additional sum for his family back in Hungary.

=== Death ===
In 1953, Kautzky suffered from a month long illness at the end of which he unexpectedly pass away, aged 56.
