= Kinkel =

Kinkel may refer to:

- Bob Kinkel, a musician
- Gottfried Kinkel (1815–1882), German poet
- Johanna Kinkel (1810–1858), German composer, writer, and revolutionary
- Kip Kinkel (born 1982), American school shooter
- Klaus Kinkel (1936–2019), German politician
