= Otis Cook =

American painter (1900–1980)

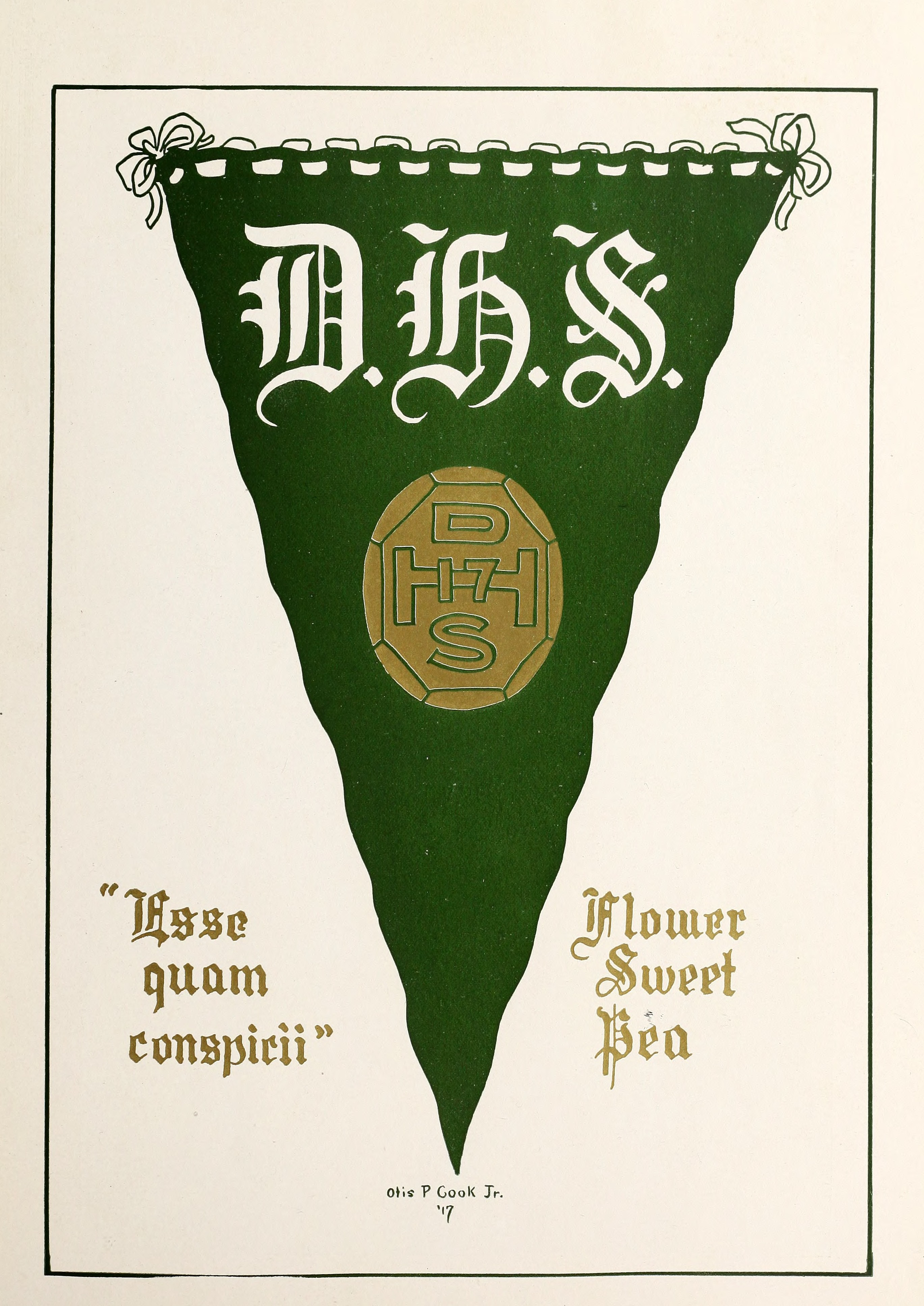
Artwork by Otis Pierce Cook Jr. (1917)

Otis Pierce Cook Jr. (1900–1980) was an American painter born in New Bedford, Massachusetts. He was mostly famous for his oil paintings of coastal and landscape scenes and studied under Emil Gruppe of Gloucester. He lived much of his life in Rockport, MA and Cape Ann was the focal point for much of his work. He was a member of the Rockport Art Association. In 1935, Cook had an art gallery on Bearskin Neck in Rockport and was a member of The Rockport Art Galleries along with William Lester Stevens, Joseph Eliot Enneking, Arthur J. Hammond, Marian Parkhust Sloane and Frank M. Rines.

His paintings are in the permanent collections of major museums and private collections across America, including in the Springfield Museum of Art.
