= Emile Gruppe =

American painter (1896–1978)

Emile Gruppé
- Born: Emile Albert Gruppé; 1896
- Died: 1978 (aged 81–82); Gloucester, Massachusetts, U.S.
- Other name: Emil Gruppe
- Father: Charles P. Gruppé
- Relatives: Virginia Helena Gruppé (sibling)

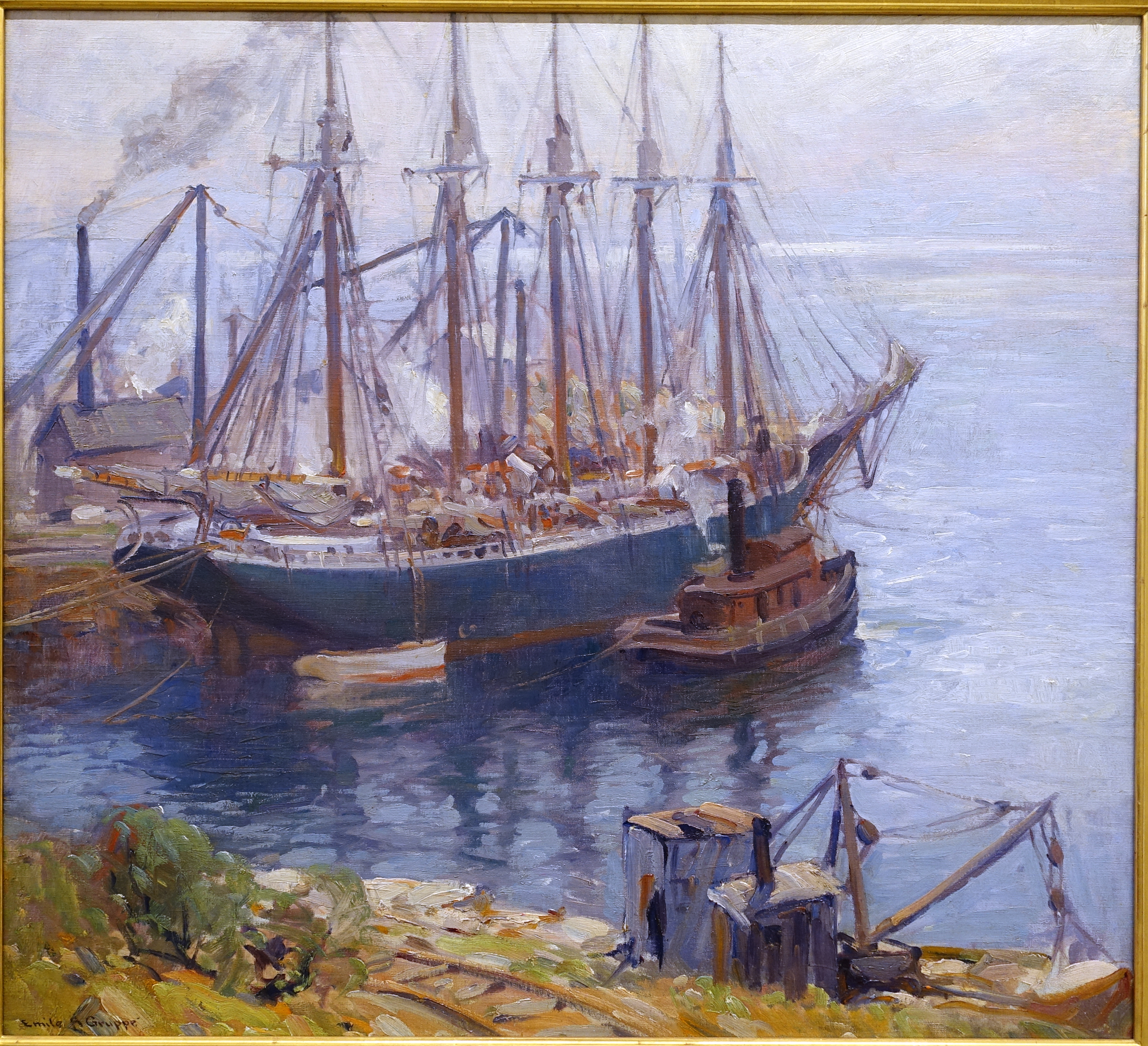
Five Masted Granite Schooner, by Emile Albert Gruppé, c. 1920s

Emile Albert Gruppé (1896–1978) was an American painter, known for impressionistic landscapes and Massachusetts coastal and marine paintings.

== Early life and education ==
Emile Albert Gruppé was born 1896 in Rochester, New York. He lived the early years of his life in the Netherlands as his father, Charles P. Gruppé, painted with the Hague School of art and acted as a dealer for the Dutch painters in the United States. The family returned permanently to the States around 1913 when rumblings of World War I were brewing. All of Emile's siblings established themselves in the arts, Paulo Mesdag (1891–1979) as a cellist, Karl Heinrich (1893–1982) as a sculptor, and Virginia Helena Gruppé as a watercolorist.

Gruppé studied at the National Academy in New York City and the Académie de la Grande Chaumière in Paris. His artistic career began in 1915 but was briefly interrupted in 1917, when he spent a year in the United States Navy.

== Career ==
He made his permanent studio in Gloucester, Massachusetts, and became a member of the Cape Ann school of artists.

Although Gruppé is best known for his variety of impressionistic landscapes, he also painted figures and portraits. His modern style was largely inherited from the French Impressionist Monet. "Lily Pads", date and location unknown, one of Gruppe's landscapes, attests to Monet's influence; it is similar to some of the paintings in Monet's Water Lilies series.

From 1940–1970, he ran the Gloucester School of Painting at Rocky Neck, on Smith Cove in Gloucester, Massachusetts. He was the teacher of other famous artists including oil painter Otis Cook of Rockport, Massachusetts, and his work was an influence on Bill Wray, Nathalie Nordstrand, Carl W. Illig, and other painters. He sometimes wintered in Naples, Florida, where he painted tropical scenes. He also wrote books for artists on brushwork, color and technique.

He was a member of the Salmagundi Club; the North Shore Art Association (1929-1978); the Rockport Art Association; the Gloucester Society of Artists; the Allied Artists of America; the Longboat Key Art Association; the Sarasota Art Association, amongst others.

== Legacy ==
Emile Albert Gruppé died in 1978 in Gloucester, Massachusetts. He is buried at Mt. Pleasant Cemetery in Gloucester. Of his children, Robert C. Gruppé, also a painter, maintains the Gruppé Gallery at Rocky Neck, in Gloucester, Massachusetts, while his daughter Emilie Gruppe Alexander maintains the Emile A. Gruppe Gallery in Jericho, Vermont. Both galleries feature Emile's paintings among others.

Gruppé's paintings are often seen in major auction galleries, such as Sotheby's, Christie's, and Skinners. Auction prices have risen steadily and exceed most Rockport School artists. Gruppé is among the most prominent of Rockport artists, a group that includes Anthony Thieme, Marguerite Pierson, Antonio Cirino, W. Lester Stevens, and Aldro Hibbard.

== Publications ==
- Gruppé, Emile A. (1979). Gruppé on Color: Using Expressive Color to Paint Nature. Watson-Guptill Publications. ISBN 9780823021550.
- Gruppé, Emile A. (1977). Brushwork: A Guide to Expressive Brushwork for Oil Painting. Watson-Guptill Publications. ISBN 9780823005253.
- Gruppé, Emile A. (1976). Gruppé on Painting: Direct Techniques in Oil. Watson-Guptill Publications. ISBN 9780823021574.
