= Howard Everett Smith =

American painter

- Born: April 27, 1885; West Windham, New Hampshire, United States
- Died: October 9, 1970 (aged 85); Carmel, California, United States
- Occupation: Painter

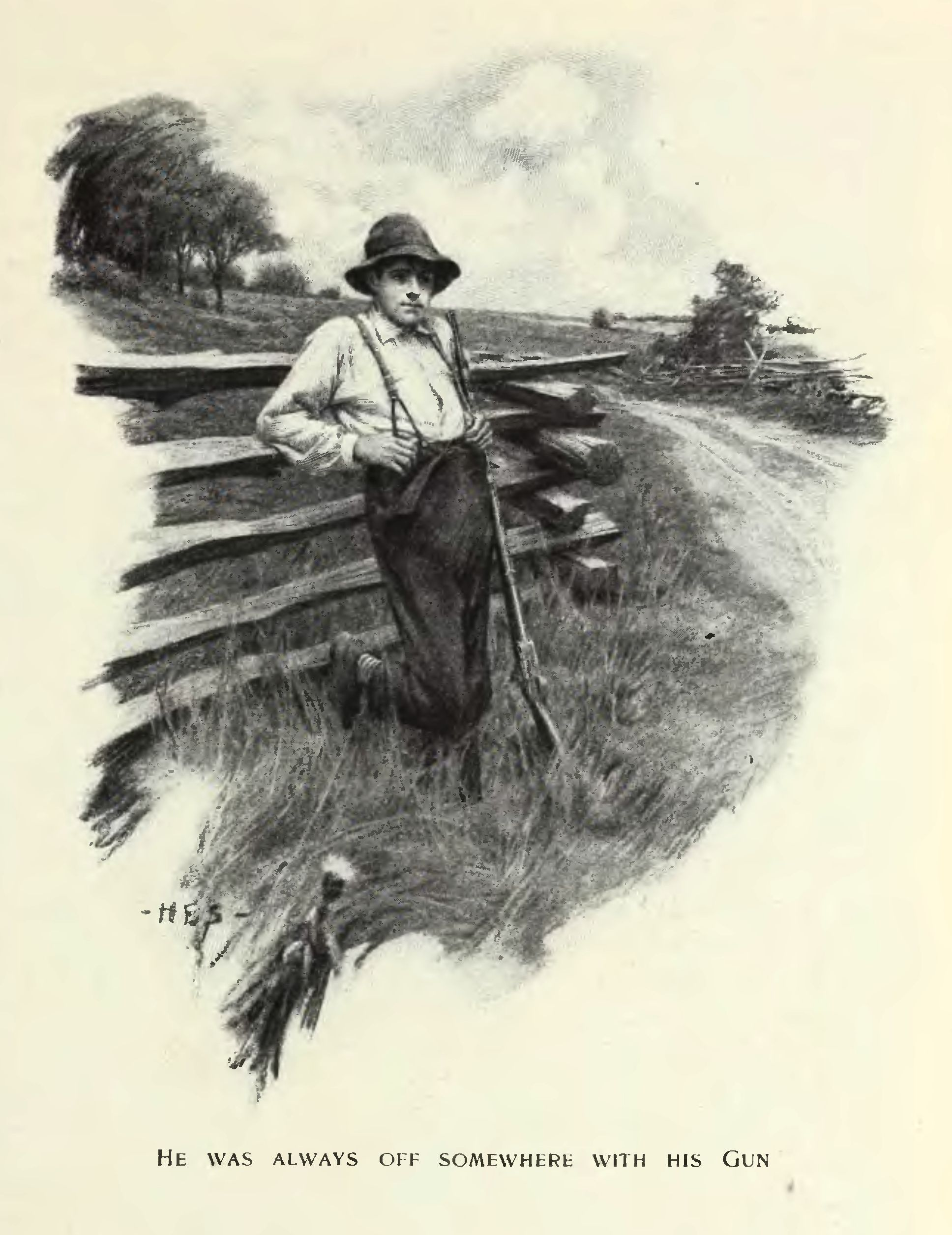
Illustration by H. E. Smith for "The Enchanted Bluff" published in Harper's, 1909

Howard Everett Smith (April 27, 1885 – October 9, 1970) was an American painter, portraitist, and illustrator.

His childhood was spent in Windham, New Hampshire. In 1899, his family moved to Boston. He attended Boston Latin School before continuing his art studies, first at the Art Students' League in New York and then two years with Howard Pyle. Returning to Boston in 1909, he studied with Edmund Tarbell at the School of Art of the Boston Museum of Fine Arts. The Paige Traveling Scholarship gave him the opportunity to travel and draw in Europe from 1911 to 1914.

His illustrations appeared in Harper's and Scribner's between 1905 and 1913, and for several years he taught at the Rhode Island School of Design.

He painted scenes illustrating ordinary American life, often that told a story. Among the many portraits he completed were some of fellow artists, such as Harry Aiken Vincent.

He won numerous prizes including the Hallgarten Prize in 1917 and the Isidor Medal in 1921, both from the National Academy.

In the twenties, he and his family spent many of their summers in Rockport and Provincetown. He was one of the founders of the Rockport Art Association. While in Provincetown, the family became friends with Eugene O'Neill, who asked Smith to illustrate his first published play.

H. E. Smith's work was part of the painting event in the art competition at the 1932 Summer Olympics.

From 1938 onwards he and his family lived in Carmel, California, where he expanded his interest in equine art, ranging from race horses to the pack horses in the Sierra Mountains. He completed an ambitious series of lithographs of the 107th Cavalry Regiment, showing the horses as well as the mechanized transport. Smith joined the board of the Carmel Art Association, became active in the community and lived in Carmel until his death.

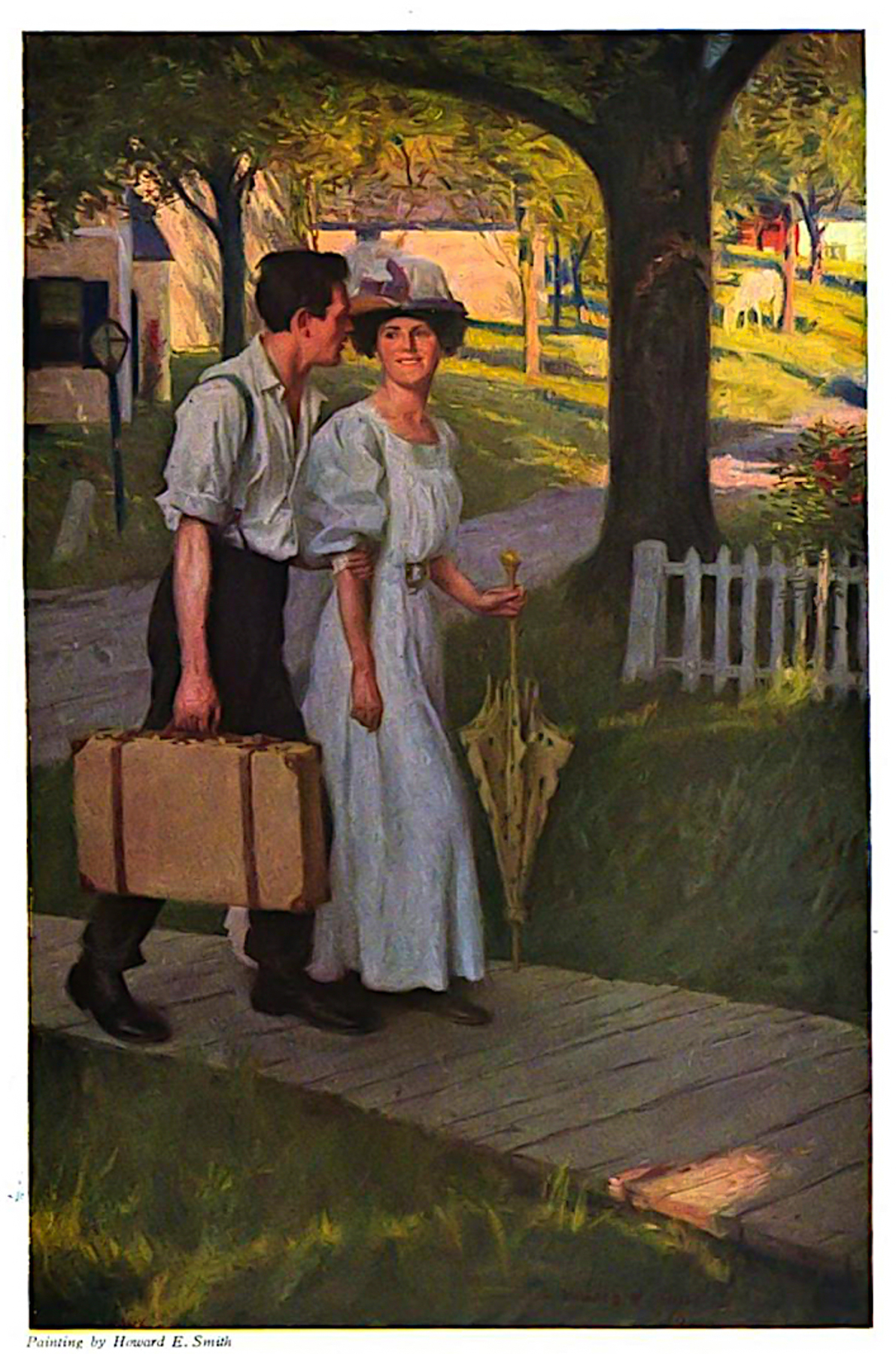
He took her by the arm and led her into the house.

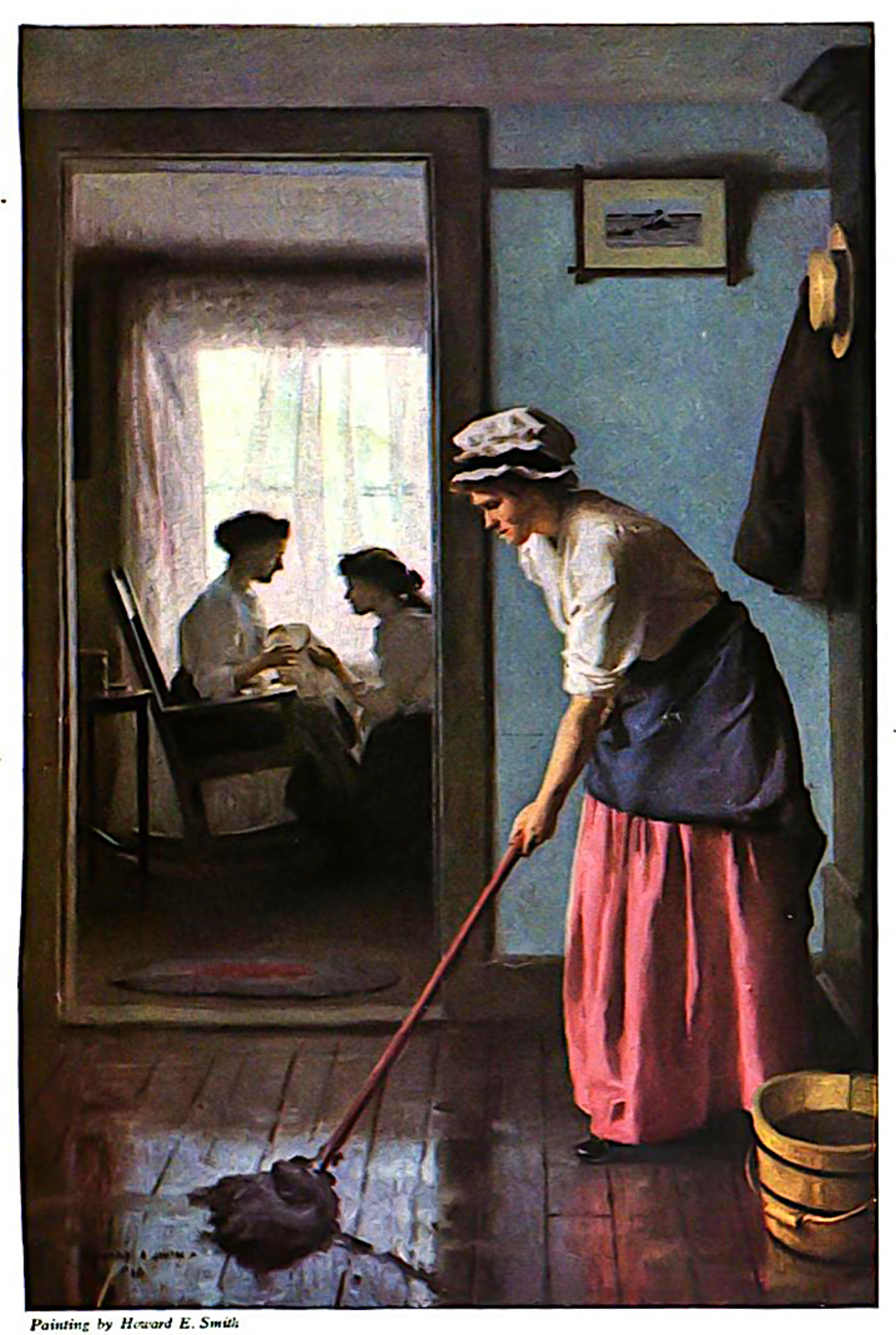
It was supposed that Annie had no thoughts of marriage
