= Northeastern United States blizzard of 1978 =

American natural disaster

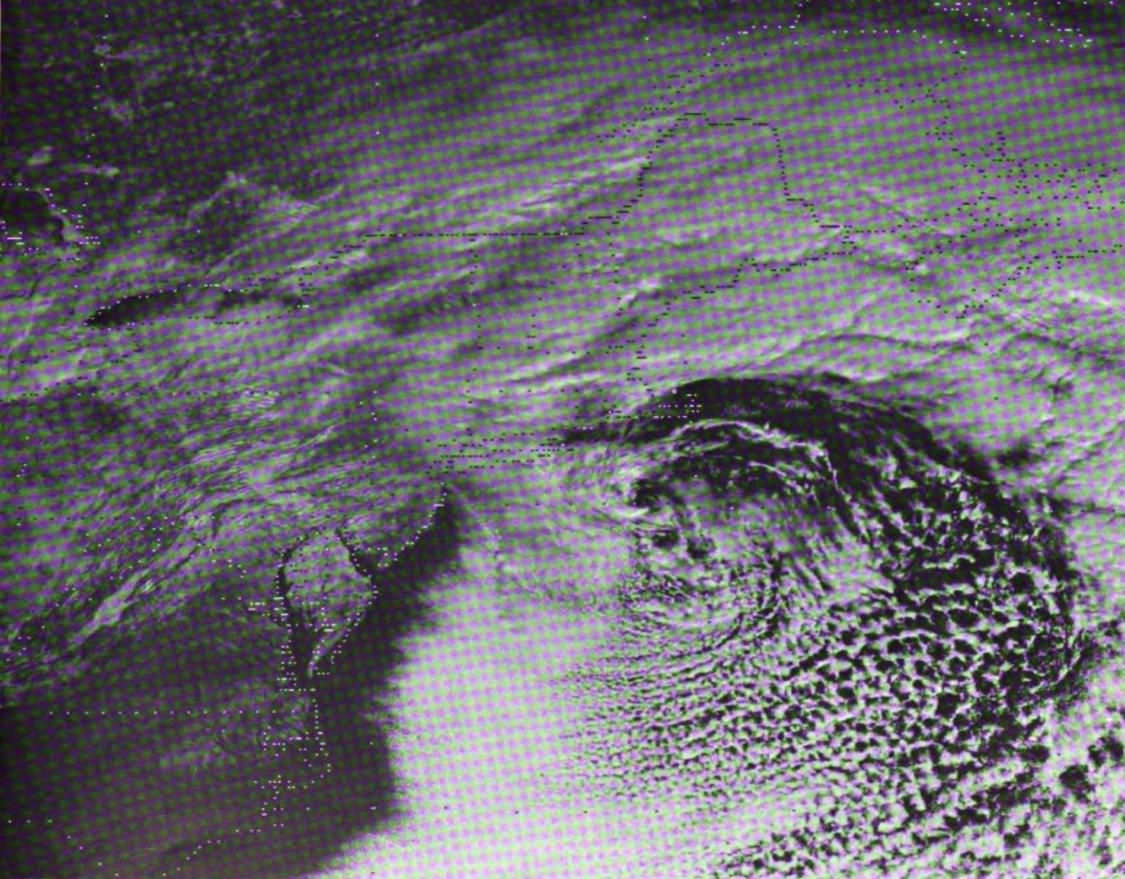
- The nor'easter centered south of New England on February 7.

Meteorological history
- Formed: February 5, 1978
- Dissipated: February 7, 1978

Category 5 "Extreme" blizzard
- Regional snowfall index: 18.42 (NOAA)
- Highest winds: 86 mph (138 km/h)
- Highest gusts: 111 mph (179 km/h) near Scituate, Massachusetts
- Lowest pressure: 992 mbar (hPa); 29.29 inHg
- Max. snowfall: ≥40 in (100 cm) in Plymouth County, Massachusetts

Overall effects
- Fatalities: 100 total
- Injuries: 4,500
- Damage: $520 million (1978 USD)
- Areas affected: Northeastern United States
- Part of the 1977–78 North American winter

The Northeastern United States blizzard of 1978 was a catastrophic, historic nor'easter that struck New England, New Jersey, Pennsylvania, and the New York metropolitan area. The Blizzard of '78 formed on Sunday, February 5, 1978 and broke up on February 7. The storm was initially known as "Storm Larry" in Connecticut, following the local convention promoted by the Travelers Weather Service on television and radio stations there. Snow fell mostly from Monday morning, February 6 to the evening of Tuesday, February 7. Connecticut, Rhode Island, and Massachusetts were hit especially hard by this storm.

Boston received a record-breaking 27.1 inches (69 cm) of snow; Providence also broke a record with 27.6 inches (70 cm); Atlantic City broke an all-time storm accumulation with 20.1 inches (51 cm); two Philadelphia suburban towns in Chester County received 20.2 inches (51 cm), while the City of Philadelphia received 16.0 inches (41 cm). Nearly all economic activity was disrupted in the worst-hit areas. The storm killed about 100 people in the Northeast and injured about 4,500. It caused more than US$520 million (US$2.57 billion in 2025 terms) in damage.

== Meteorological history ==
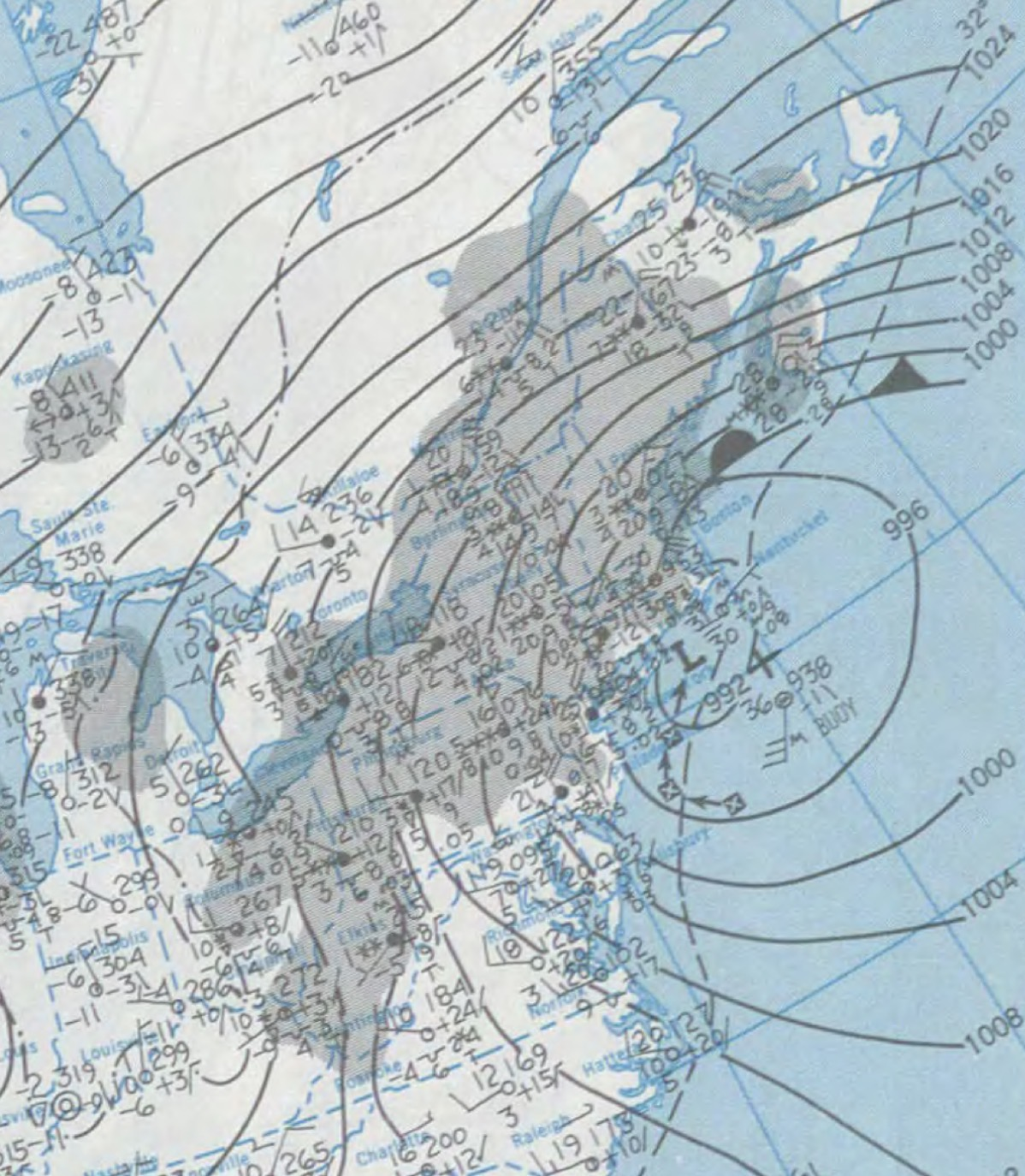
Surface weather map of the storm on February 7

The storm was formed from an extratropical cyclone off the coast of South Carolina on February 5. An Arctic cold front and a cold air mass then merged with the storm, creating the perfect ingredients for a large and intense low-pressure system.

This storm system made its way up the coast and approached southern New England late February 6 and early February 7. Since it developed during a new moon, an unusually large high tide occurred, and the storm brought a massive amount of water along coastal communities. The huge storm surge resulted in broken sea walls and massive property loss.

Strong winds and extremely heavy precipitation brought zero visibility for travelers, and numerous power outages ensued. The precipitation changed to rain on Cape Cod, reducing the total snowfall, but snow continued in the west. By the time it ended, thousands of people were stranded and homeless as a result of the storm.

=== Storm strength ===
The storm's power was made apparent by its sustained hurricane-force winds of approximately 86 mph (138 km/h) with gusts to 111 mph (179 km/h) and the formation of an eye-like structure in the middle. While a typical nor'easter brings steady snow for six to twelve hours, the Blizzard of '78 brought heavy snow for an unprecedented full 33 hours as it was blocked from heading into the North Atlantic by a strong Canadian high pressure area. In many areas in Central and Southern New England, the snow falling at night turned to an icy mix that left a notable layer of solid ice on every external surface. This icy mixture greatly complicated recovery efforts in subsequent days, as it added considerable weight to power lines and tree limbs. Many trees that survived the daytime snow event did not survive the nighttime conditions.

An atypical vertical development of storm clouds brought unusual thundersnow to southern New England and Long Island. These storms resulted in lightning and thunder accompanying the snowfall as it fell at 4 inches (10 cm) an hour at times.

== Preparations and impact ==
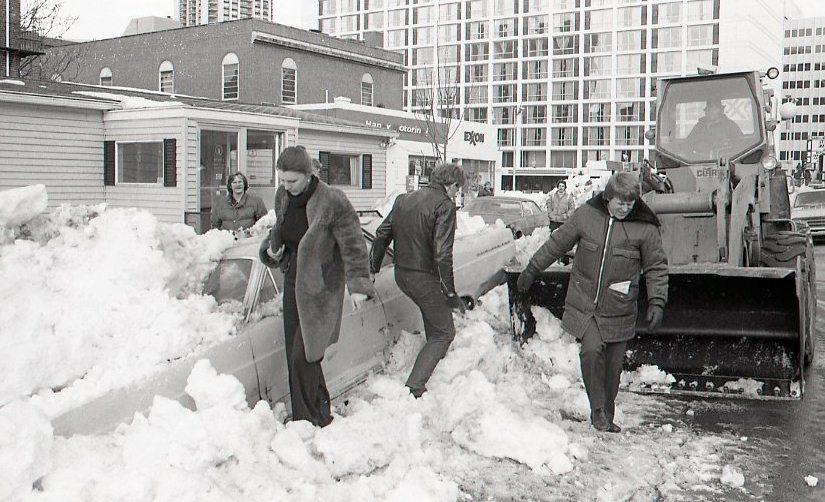
Car buried by snow in Boston

One of the major problems with the Blizzard of 1978 was the lack of foreknowledge about the storm's severity. Weather forecasting in New England is difficult, and meteorologists had developed a reputation as being inaccurate. Forecasting techniques and technology had improved dramatically in the 1970s, but the public was still quite skeptical. Snow failed to arrive in Monday's pre-dawn hours as predicted, and many locals felt it to be another failed forecast—despite the accuracy of National Weather Service (NWS) forecasters' predictions concerning the Great Blizzard—and they went to work and school as normal. Because of this, people had neither time nor incentive to prepare. The region was already reeling after storms in January 1978 that left nearly two feet of snow in some areas of New England, and had caused the collapse of the roof of the Hartford Civic Center.

=== Massachusetts ===
The government of Massachusetts had a system for notifying major employers to send employees home early in the event of heavy storms. Thousands of employees were sent home starting in the early afternoon of February 6, but thousands more were still caught by the storm. Some did not make it home for several days. Many people were stranded in their cars along roads throughout New England. Fourteen people died on I-95/MA-128 near Boston because snow piled high enough to prevent poisonous exhaust fumes from escaping from their idling vehicles. I-95 eventually had to be evacuated by cross-country skiers and snowmobilers. More than 3,500 cars were found abandoned and buried on roads during the cleanup. This number excludes the countless other vehicles buried in driveways, on the sides of streets, and in parking lots. Other transportation links were disrupted and shut down throughout the region, stranding public-transit commuters in city centers.

Snowplows were also stranded in traffic as the snow continued to fall. At one point on I-93 north of Boston, a jackknifed tractor trailer blocked traffic in both directions, with a similar event occurring on Route 128 near Route 138 in Canton. The Neponset River also flooded I-93 in Milton, causing the highway's complete closure.

A massive effort was made to clear Logan Airport runways for 200 National Guard troops' arrival on 27 C-130 and C-141 military flights from Fort Bragg and Fort Devens, who were called out by the governor.

Some 11,666 college-hockey fans in Boston Garden, then the site of the 26th edition of the annual "Beanpot" college ice hockey tournament, held at the time of the blizzard's outbreak, found weather much different from what they had expected. Some spectators spent the next few days living at the arena, eating hot dogs, and sleeping in the bleachers and locker rooms. Because of the blizzard, the second round of the Beanpot that year was not held until March 1, 1978, the latest date ever for the tournament's concluding games.

Throughout eastern Massachusetts, automobile traffic was banned for the remainder of the week. Thousands of people walked and skied on the quiet city streets and over the frozen Charles River.

The storm's straight-line surface winds destroyed buildings along the coast, often aided by flooding and waves. Wind gusts of 100 mph (160 km/h) were recorded in Plum Island and 110 mph (180 km/h) at First Cliff in Scituate, Massachusetts. Duxbury Beach was hit with 85 mph (137 km/h) gusts and 93 mph (150 km/h) in Chatham.

=== Rhode Island ===
This blizzard was one of the worst in Rhode Island's history, catching off guard many residents and the state government. Although Governor J. Joseph Garrahy had ordered an emergency evacuation of all public buildings, shortly before noon on February 6, too many people had lagged. Providence County, Rhode Island, was the hardest hit by the blizzard; the towns of Lincoln, Smithfield, Woonsocket, and North Smithfield all reported totals of at least 40 inches (100 cm) snow.

Brown University students had returned to Providence on Sunday February 5, following intersession. Second semester classes commenced, as did blizzard snowfall, on Monday February 6. The volume of snow caused cancellation of classes for the remainder of the week. With vehicular movement in Providence impossible due to snowfall, many Brown students donned Red Cross badges, their skis, and delivered provision to snowbound senior citizens and other vulnerable people. Students not delivering food to Providence residents joined Operation Dig Out to clear campus sidewalks of snow. Operation Dig Out was followed by the celebratory Operation Blow Out.

=== New York ===
In New York City, it was one of the rare times that a snowstorm closed the schools; the New York City Board of Education closed schools for snow again only once in the next 18 years, on April 7, 1982. Most suburban districts in the area close for snow several times each winter, but they rarely do in the city itself because of relatively easy access to subways, whose ability to run is not appreciably affected by moderate snowstorms. The New York Knicks were forced to postpone a basketball game for the first time ever, due to the airports being closed and the Portland Trail Blazers being unable to arrive in time.

Many people were caught in the storm while driving, and many others were trapped in their homes and workplaces, with snow drifts of up to 15 feet (4.6 m), in some places blocking the exits. In many cases, those who had become ill or had been injured during the storm had to be taken to hospitals by snowmobile. Other people left their homes and went for help by cross-country skis and sleds.

=== Other regions ===
The storm caused coastal flooding. The fierce northeast winds from the storm—with the low-pressure area stalled off the island of Martha's Vineyard—combined with high tides and storm surge, resulting from the storm's low pressure. This sent water over low land along the shores of Long Island Sound, Cape Cod Bay, and other bodies of water, causing some of the worst recorded coastal flooding. The flood continued through two days of tide cycles, a total of four successive high tides. Thousands of homes throughout coastal Massachusetts were damaged or destroyed, as was "Motif Number 1", in Rockport, an often-painted fisherman's shack renowned in art circles. (A replica was constructed later the same year.) The Peter Stuyvesant, a former Hudson River Day Line boat turned into a floating restaurant, was sunk in Boston Harbor. The region's fishing fleet was damaged by the storm.

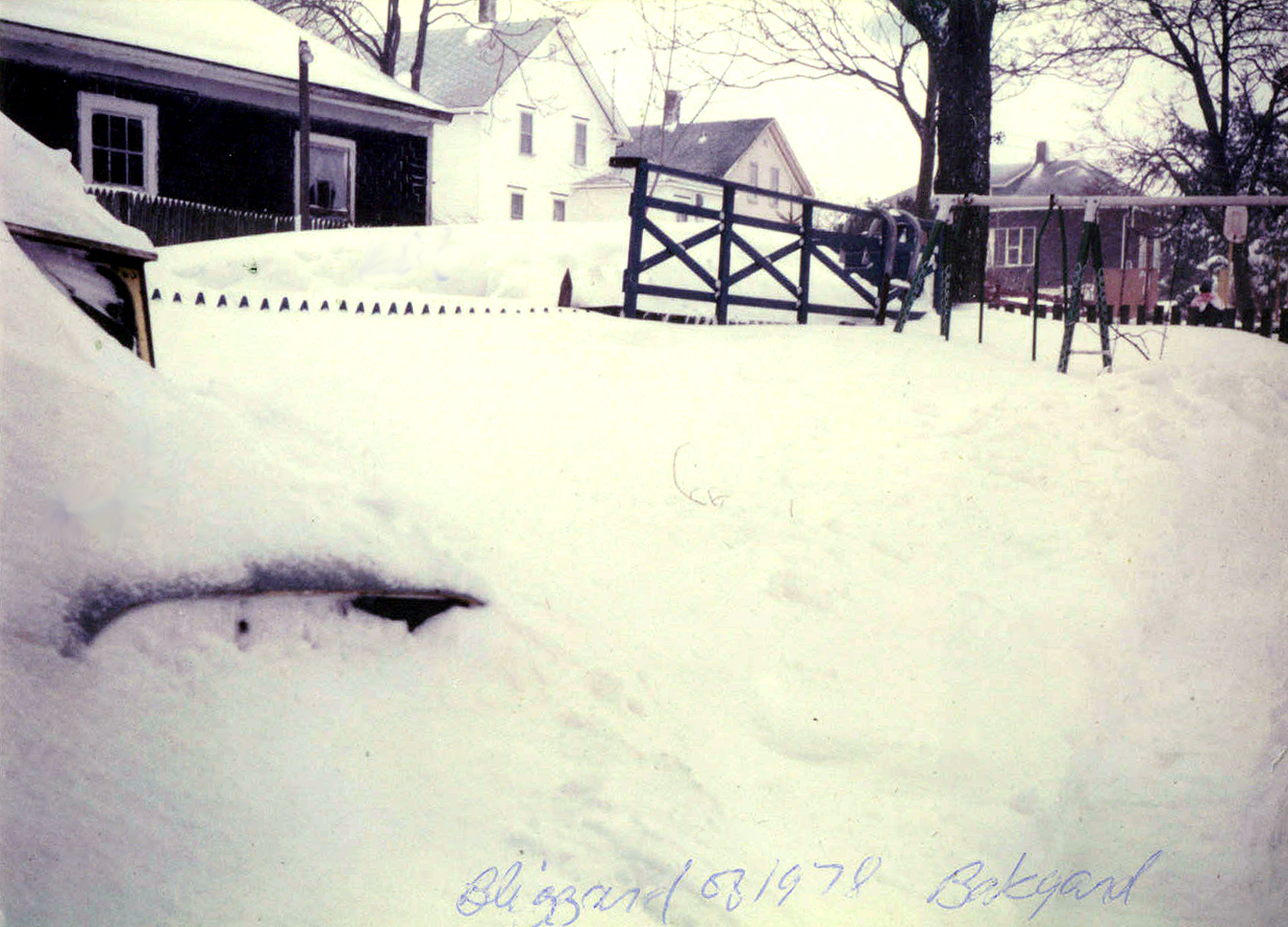
Maple Street, Woonsocket, Rhode Island

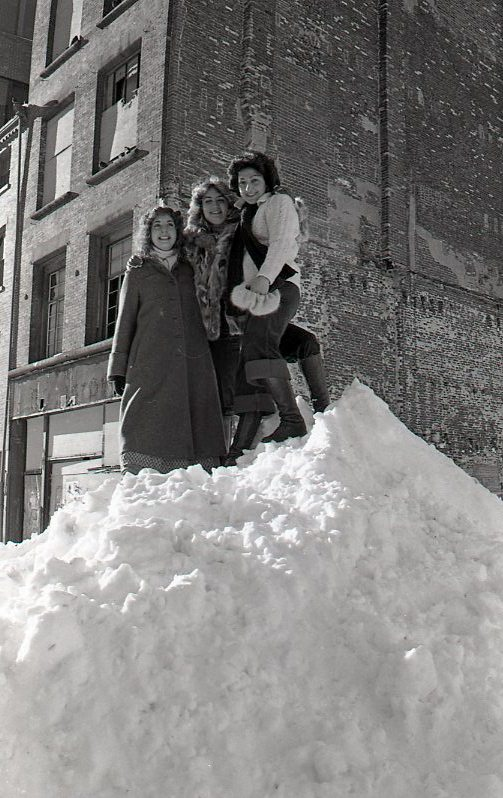
Women standing atop a snow pile in Boston

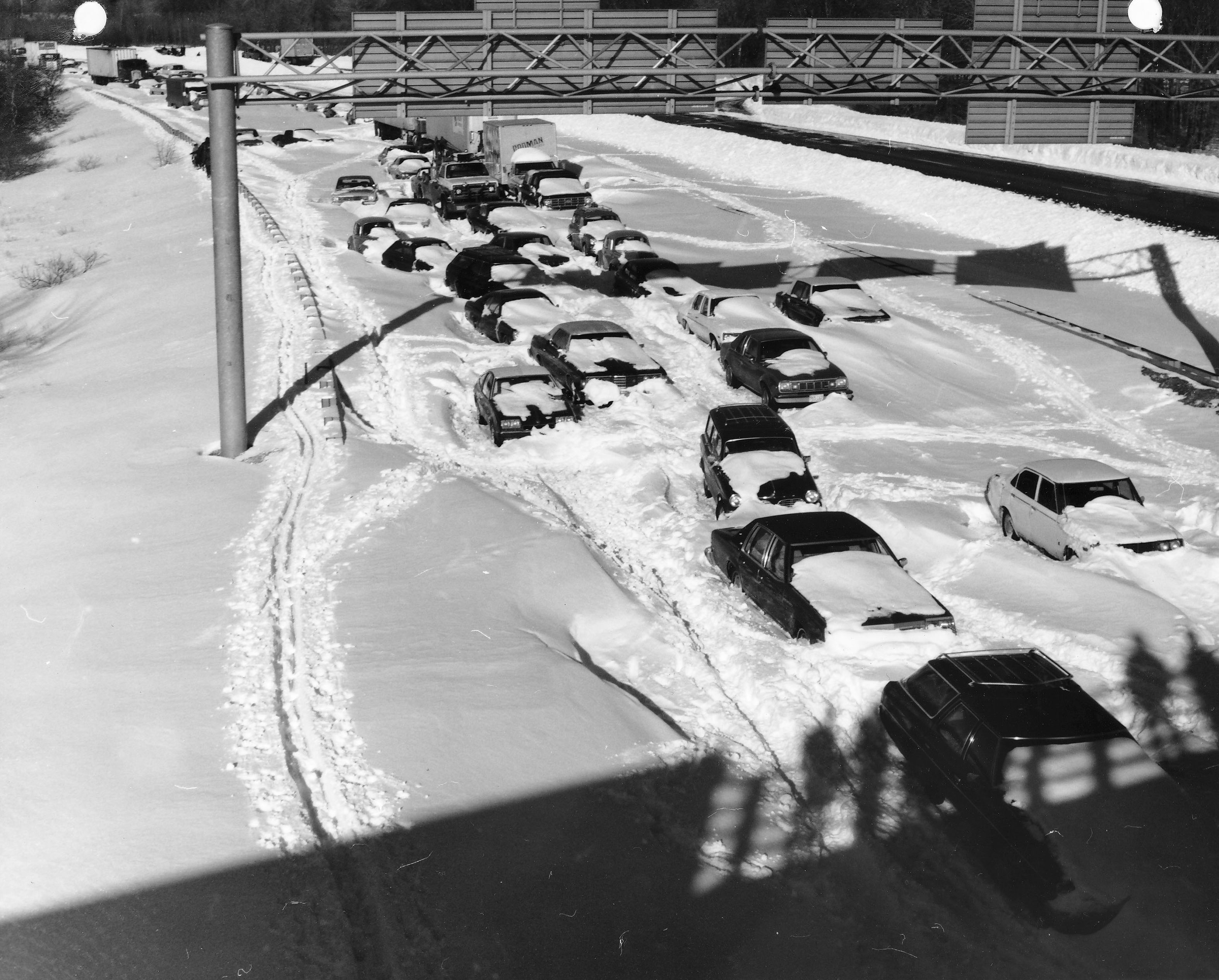
Cars and trucks stuck in snow on Route 128 near Needham, Massachusetts

=== Aftermath and recovery ===
Boston and Providence recorded all-time highs for 24-hour and storm snowfall. Many people were left without heat, water, food, and electricity for over a week after the storm finished. Approximately 10,000 people moved into emergency shelters. Some 2,500 houses were reported as seriously damaged or destroyed and 54 people were killed, many because of fallen electrical wires. Several people were found dead in downtown Providence, near the central police station; they may have been seeking shelter. Ten-year-old Peter Gosselin, of Uxbridge, Massachusetts, disappeared in the deep snow just feet from his home's front door and was not found until three weeks later. Most of the Interstate highway system in the region was shut down, with some stretches not reopening to traffic until the following week. Air and rail traffic also were shut down.

The snow fell too quickly for plow trucks to keep up. Plows were further hampered by the number of cars stuck on the roads. In Boston, the deep snow overwhelmed the city's sanitation department, because there was no more room along streets and sidewalks to put the snow; much of it was hauled to nearby harbors and dumped. Throughout the region, the high winds caused enormous drifts.

A state of emergency was declared by governors in the affected states, and the United States National Guard was called out to help clear the roads. Additional troops were flown into Boston to help. It took six days to clear the roads of snow and of the cars and trucks buried in it. Governor Ella T. Grasso ordered all roads in Connecticut closed except for emergency travel, for three days; Governor Michael Dukakis, of Massachusetts, did the same for his state. The parking lot of Fenway Park was used for the National Guard to stage its efforts. In Massachusetts, there was no travel ban again until 35 years later, when Governor Deval Patrick announced a travel ban on February 8, 2013, running from 4 p.m. that day until 4 p.m. the next day, because of the February 2013 nor'easter, whose snowfall rivaled and, in some places, beat that of the Blizzard of '78; in the "Blizzard of '13", the ban was declared before the worst hit; in the Blizzard of '78 this happened after the storm's worst.

Extensive beach erosion occurred on the east coast of Massachusetts. Especially hard-hit were Cape Cod and Cape Ann, both on the eastern shore of Massachusetts. In Truro, on Cape Cod, the Atlantic Ocean broke through to the Pamet River for the first time during this storm, completely washing away the link between the North and South Pamet roads. The town chose not to reconstruct the link, though the right-of-way is open to pedestrians. Monomoy Island was split into north and south parts.

Many homes along the New England and Long Island coastlines were destroyed or washed into the ocean. Many roofs collapsed across New England from snow load.

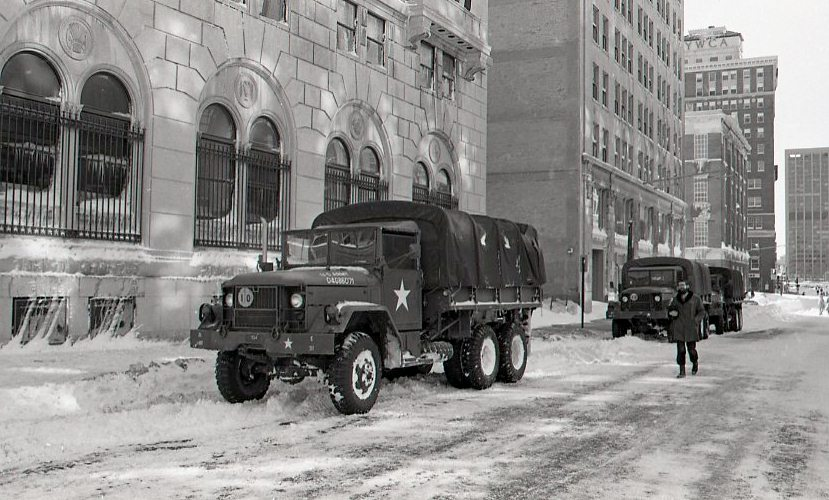
National Guard vehicles in Boston

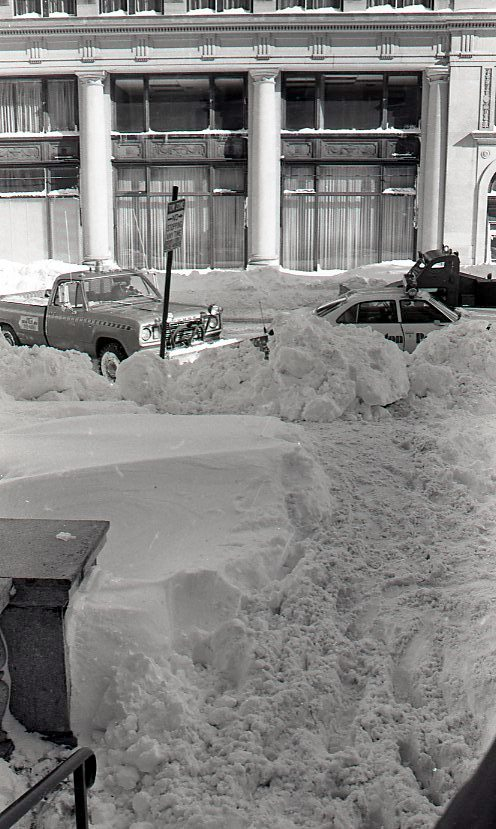
Snow removal in Boston

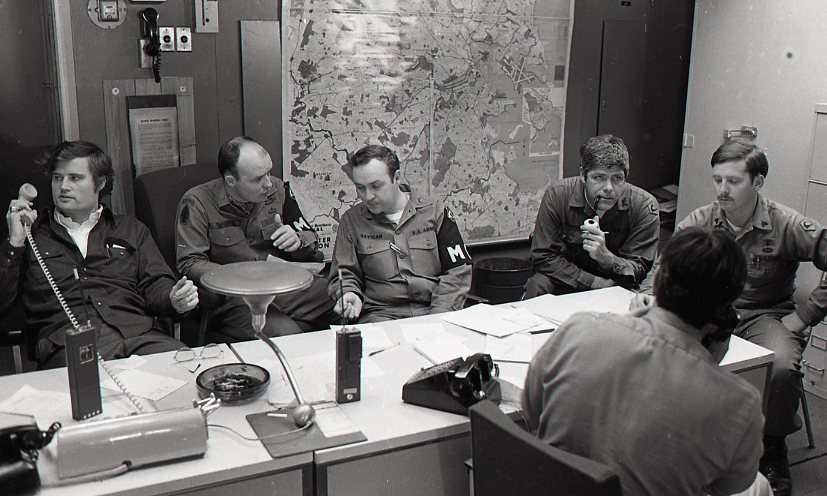
National Guard emergency management center in Boston

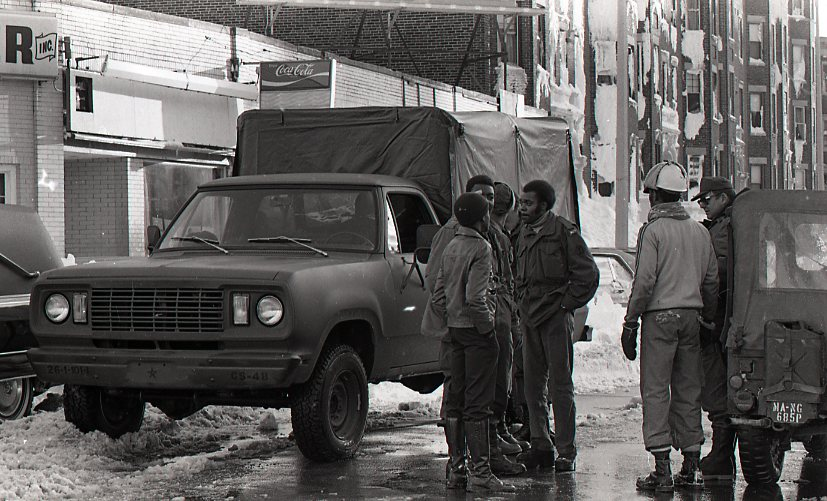
National Guardsmen work with local workers and volunteers in Boston

== See also ==
- February 2026 North American blizzard – Another historic northeast blizzard that broke several records set by this blizzard
