= David Thieme =

American designer (1942–2025)

- Born: 1942; Minneapolis, U.S.
- Died: August 12, 2025 (aged 83)
- Education: Pratt Institute
- Occupations: Designer, Oil Trader and former CEO of Essex Overseas Petroleum Corporation

David Thieme (1942 – August 12, 2025) was an American designer, son of the artist and designer Anthony Thieme. He was the owner of the Essex Overseas Petroleum Corporation, the company that sponsored Team Lotus, between 1979 and 1981, and also the official entry for Porsche in the 1979 24 Hours of Le Mans.

== Education and affairs ==
Thieme studied industrial design at the Pratt Institute in Brooklyn. In 1973 he used the money that he had achieved with his work as a designer and founded Essex Overseas Petroleum Corporation, an oil-trading company. Based in a room of the Hôtel de Paris Monte-Carlo in Monaco, the company was a one-man show, and was capable of making much money - some sources claim the firm was making about 70 million dollars of profit per year.

== Motorsport connections ==
Thieme's passion for racing cars, and the fact that he struck up a friendship with Colin Chapman in 1978, brought him to Formula 1. Between 1979 and 1981 he became first a major sponsor and ultimately the main sponsor of Team Lotus. With major team presentation parties in 1980 and 1981, in venues like the Royal Albert Hall, Thieme brought glamour and extravagance to motorsport, having even hired the Michelin starred chef Roger Vergé to cook for all his guests at the motorhomes.

In 1979 Essex, also sponsored the official Porsche entries for the 24 Hours of Le Mans, but the two 936s, #12 (driven by Jacky Ickx, Brian Redman and Jürgen Barth) and the #14 (with Bob Wollek and Hurley Haywood) did not finish the race, although the number 14 car took pole position and the number 12 car set the fastest lap.

== Fraud charges and jail ==
In April 1981, David Thieme was arrested at an airport in Zurich because of accusations of fraud to the amount of $7.6 million from the bank Credit Suisse. After two weeks of investigation he was released on bail, which according to sources was $150,000 and paid by Mansour Ojjeh. Subsequently the Essex empire collapsed and Thieme disappeared.

== Personal life and death ==
According to what was stated Thieme lived in Paris with his wife, the daughter of comedian André Pousse. Thieme died on August 12, 2025, at the age of 83.
