= Paul Strisik =

American painter

Paul Strisik (April 22, 1918 – July 22, 1998) was an American plein air painter.

== Background ==
Paul Strisik was born in Brooklyn, New York. From 1937 to 1940 he owned and operated the Hall Fish and Line Co. in New York State before enlisting in the US Navy in 1941. He was stationed in French Morocco where he served as Chief Photographers Mate. In the 1950s he moved to Rockport, Massachusetts, and later attended the Art Students League of New York where he was taught by Frank DuMond.

Strisik was an en plein air painter who worked in both oil and watercolor. While primarily a New England artist, he also painted European subjects and, between 1976 and 1992, lived and painted part-time in Santa Fe, New Mexico.

During his life, Strisik was a member of both the Rockport Art Association and the North Shore Art Association, and an Academician with the National Academy of Design. He also wrote several books on painting, including The Art of Landscape Painting and Capturing Light in Oils.
