= Elise Schmezer =

German singer

Elise Kratky Schmezer (1810–1856) was a German singer and teacher who composed one opera and many songs.

Schmezer’s father Josef Kratky taught trumpet, trombone, and horn in Graz (today in Austria). She performed as a singer in Graz until her marriage to the tenor Friedrich Schmezer in the 1830s and his appointment as a singer/director in Braunschweig, Germany, in 1836. Elise Schmezer composed and taught voice after their move to Braunschweig.

Several composers dedicated works to Elise Schmezer:

- 1844 – Piano Trio No. 4, Op. 31 by Alexander Fesca
- 1845 – Modern Salon Compositions for Piano, Op. 1 by Louis Köhler
- 1850 – Douze Études for Piano by Charles Mayer

In 1853, Schmezer’s opera Otto der Schütz premiered in Brunswick at the Herzogliches Hoftheater. The libretto by Friedrich Schmezer was based on works by Alexandre Dumas and Johanna Kinkel.

Schmezer’s compositions were published by Bachmann & Nagel, Damkohler, Heinrichshofen, Carl Luckhardt, Mayer, and A. M. Schlesinger. They included:

== Opera ==
- Otto der Schütz (libretto by Friedrich Schmezer; orchestrated by Carl Zabel)

== Vocal ==
- Opus 4, Lieder, Romanzen und Balladen für Tenor

No. 1. “Der Troubadour” (text by Ferdinand Freiligrath after Sir Walter Scott
No. 2. “Rothe Rose” (text by Ferdinand Freiligrath after Robert Burns)
No. 3. ”Thürmerlied” (text Emanuel Geibel)

- Opus 5, Lieder, Romanzen und Balladen fur Tenor

No. 1 “Valencia’s Rose” (text by Gustav Brandt)
No. 2 “Die Sultanin” (text by Ignaz Hub)
No. 3 "Der Zigeunerbube" (text by Emanuel Geibel)

- Opus 6, Lieder, Romanzen und Balladen

No. 1 “Wenn ich in deine Augen seh’” (text by Heinrich Heine)
No. 2 “Ich möchte sterben wie der Schwan” (text by Emanuel Geibel)
No. 3 “Der Postillon” (text by Otto Friedrich Gruppe)

- Opus 7, Lieder, Romanzen und Balladen

No. 1 “Schön Rohtraut” (text by Eduard Mörike)
No. 2 “Das Geheimnis” (text by Friedrich Schiller)
No. 3 “Widmung” (text by Friedrich Rückert)

- Opus 8, Lieder

No. 1 “Neuer Frühling” (text by Heinrich Heine)
No. 2 “Der Gruss” (text by Anonymous)
No. 3 “Der Csikos” (text by Johan Nepomuk Vogl)
No. 4 “Tyrolerlied” (text by Zille)

- Opus 10, Vier Lieder für hohe Stimme

No. 1 “Gondoliera (Keine Rosen ohne Dornen)” (text by Otto Inkermann as C. O. Sternau)
No. 2 “Auf Posten” (text by Wilhelm Hauff)
No. 3 “Zigeunerlied aus dem Persischen” (text by Georg Friedrich Daumer)
No. 4 “Gondoliera (Felice notte Marietta)” (text by Otto Inkermann as C. O. Sternau)

- Opus 11, Berg und See, aus Amaranth (text by Oscar von Redwitz-Schmölz)
- Opus 12, Jung Walther aus Amaranth (text by Oscar von Redwitz-Schmölz)
- Opus 13, Die Verwandlung (text by Christian Levin Friedrich Christian Sander)
- Opus 16, Vier Lieder

No. 4 “Leise zieht durch mein Gemüt” (text by Heinrich Heine)

- Opus 17, Drei Lieder für Sopran oder Tenor mit Pianoforte

No. 1 “Der Ursprung der Harfe”
No. 2 “Du wundersüßes Kind” (text by Otto Indermann as C. O. Sternau)
No. 3 “Was treibt dich umher, in der Frühlingsnacht?” (text by Heinrich Heine)

- Opus 18, Lieder mit englischem Texte von Robert Burns

No. 1 “Wärst du auf öder Haid allein”
No. 2 “Das Hochlandskind”
No. 3 “Die Birke von Aberfeldy”

- Opus 19, Two Songs
- Opus 20, Two Songs
