= Virginia Helena Gruppé =

American painter of landscapes and seascapes (1907–1980)

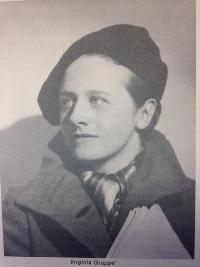
- Born: 1907; Katwijk aan Zee, Netherlands
- Died: 10 March 1980 (aged 72–73); Murray, New York, U.S.
- Other names: Virginia Gruppe Quirk
- Education: Cornell University, University of Rochester
- Spouse: Vincent Quirk
- Father: Charles P. Gruppé
- Relatives: Emile Gruppe (sibling)

Virginia Helena Gruppé, also known as Virginia Gruppé Quirk (1907–1980) was an American painter, known for her watercolors of landscapes, and coastal and marine paintings.

== Biography ==
Virginia Helena Gruppé was born in 1907 at Villa Nellie in Katwijk aan Zee, the Netherlands, to American parents Helen Elizabeth (née Mitchell, 1868–1948) and Charles P. Gruppé. She was the youngest child, and her siblings all established themselves in the arts, Paulo Mesdag (1891–1979) as a cellist, Karl Heinrich (1893–1982) as a sculptor, and Emile Albert Gruppé was a painter. She attended Cornell University and the University of Rochester.

Gruppé was married to Vincent Quirk, a chemist specializing in art restoration. Together they opened Gruppe Galleries in Holley, near Rochester and she maintained the gallery for 30 years.

Gruppé died on 10 March 1980 from a heart attack in her home in Murray, New York. In 31 March 1980, less than a month later, her husband Vincent died from pneumonia. They had been married for over 40 years.
