= Charles P. Gruppé =

American painter (1860–1940)

Charles Paul Gruppé
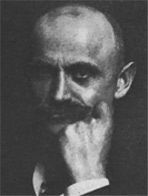
- Born: September 3, 1860; Picton, Canada West
- Died: September 30, 1940 (aged 80); Rockport, Massachusetts, U.S.
- Other name: C.P. Gruppe
- Spouse: Helen Elizabeth Gruppé (née Mitchell)
- Children: 4, including Emile Gruppe, Virginia Helena Gruppé

Charles Paul Gruppé (3 September 1860, Picton, Canada West – 30 September 1940, Rockport, Massachusetts) was a Canadian-born, American painter.

== About ==
Charles Paul Gruppé was born 3 September 1860 in Picton, Ontario, Canada. He moved to Rochester at the age of three with his mother Albertina Gruppe (1822–1900) and brother Herman and sister Clara, after the death of his father Henry W. Gruppe. He was a self-taught artist. In 1872, at the age of twelve, he was a founder of the Rochester Art Club.

Between 1897 and 1913, Gruppé lived in the Netherlands, where he painted with the Hague School and acted as a dealer for Dutch painters in the United States. He, his wife Helen Elizabeth (née Mitchell) and their children returned permanently to America in 1913 ahead of World War I. Gruppe owned a Queen Annes-style row house from July 1912 until 1972, at 138 Manhattan Avenue, New York City, New York.

All the Gruppé children were active in the arts; Paulo Mesdag (1891–1979) was a cellist, Karl Heinrich (1893–1982) was a sculptor, Virginia Helena Gruppé worked in watercolors, and Emile Albert Gruppé was a painter.

His work was part of the painting event in the art competition at the 1932 Summer Olympics.

He was a member of the Rochester Art Club, Pulchri Studio, the American Watercolor Society, New York Color Club, the National Arts Club, the Art Club of Philadelphia, and the Salmagundi Club. He died on 30 September 1940, in his summer home in Rockport, Massachusetts.

His work is included in many public museum collections including the Smithsonian American Art Museum, Detroit Institute of Arts (DIA), amongst others.
