= Anthony Thieme =

American painter

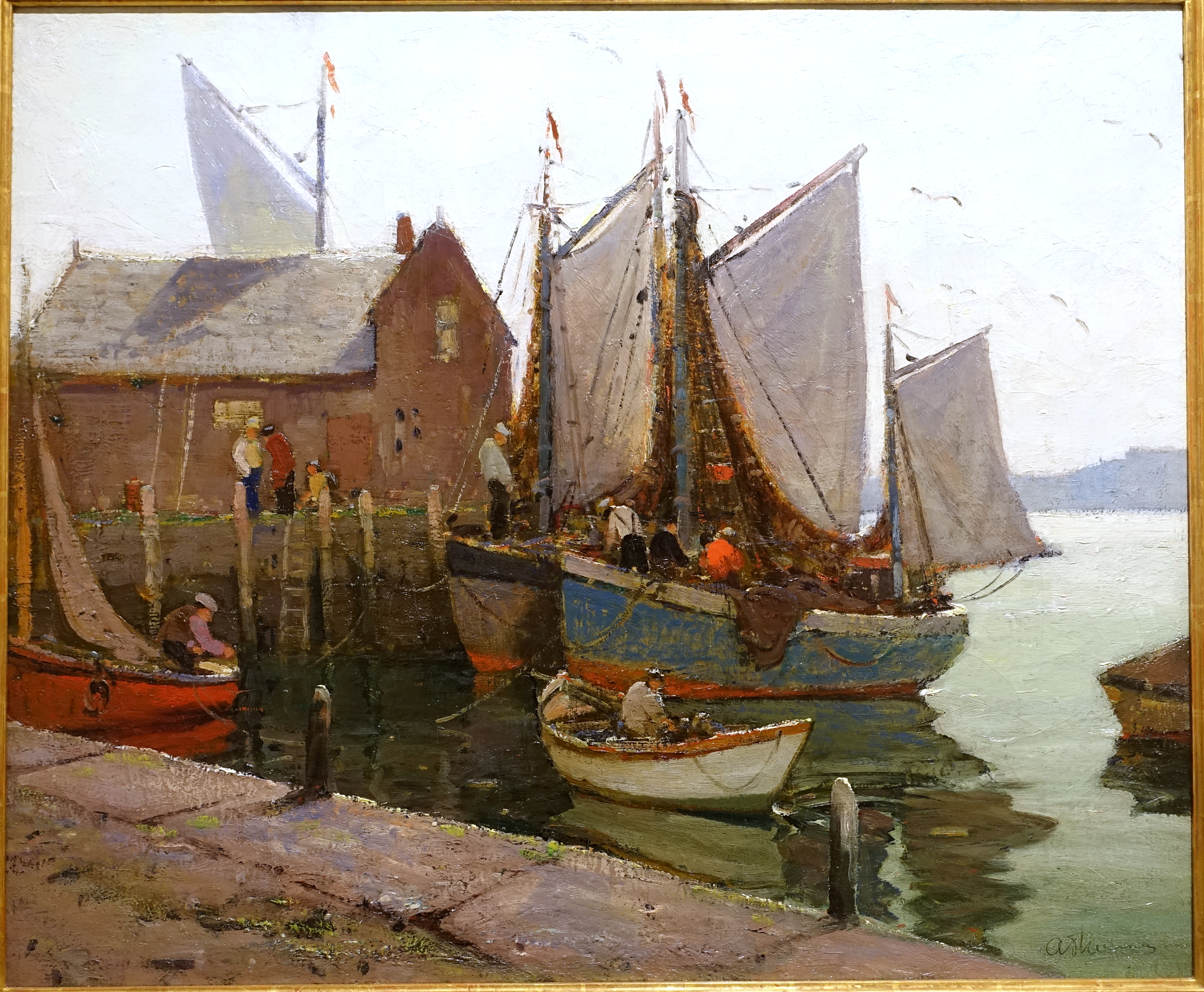
Rockport Waterfront by Anthony Thieme, c. 1930s

Anthony Thieme (20 February 1888 – 6 December 1954) was a landscape and marine painter and a major figure of the Rockport (MA) School of American regional art. He was a contemporary of important Rockport artists Aldro Hibbard, Emil Gruppe, W. Lester Stevens, Antonio Cirino, and Marguerite Pierson.

Born in Rotterdam on 20 February 1888, Thieme studied at the Academie of Fine Arts in Rotterdam for two years and then, briefly, at the Royal Academy, the Hague. He traveled widely in Europe, frequently finding work as a stage designer.

Thieme traveled to the United States at the age of 22. He quickly found work as a stage designer at the Century Theater in New York, designing sets for the Russian ballerina Anna Pavlova. When the commission ended, he traveled to South America, primarily Brazil and Argentina. Stage work again provided his livelihood. A return to Europe followed with further work in England, France, and Italy.

Returning to the United States with a contract for additional stage work, Thieme found himself in Boston. He discontinued work on the stage in 1928 and from then on made his living with the sales of his paintings and etchings. Thieme married Lillian Beckett in 1929 and moved to Rockport, MA. He established the Thieme School of Art. He exhibited his work frequently at the Grand Central Art Galleries in New York.

He continued to travel widely; Mexico, Guatemala, Florida, and France were major destinations, always painting en plein air.

Thieme committed suicide on 6 December 1954 in Greenwich, CT. The circumstances of his death are not fully understood. There have been stories of deep depression or major illness, but no definitive rationale for his suicide has emerged.

Anthony Thieme was a full member of the American Watercolor Society, Art Alliance of America, the Salmagundi Club, the Boston Art Club, North Shore Art Association, Rockport Art Association, New York Water Color Club, Art Alliance of Philadelphia and the National Arts Club.
