= Otto Gruppe =

German mythographer

Otto Gruppe (18 July 1851, Berlin – 27 November 1921, Berlin) was a German mythographer, remembered for his Griechische Mythologie und Religion-Geschichte (1906), in which used surviving texts to survey the historical development of Greek mythology and religion. He was also the author of Geschichte der Klassischen Mythologie und Religionsgeschichte während des Mittelalters in Abendland und während der Neuzeit (History of Classical Mythology and History of Religion in Medieval Western Europe and the Modern Age).

Otto Gruppe was the son of the philosopher, scholar-poet, and philologist Otto Friedrich Gruppe (1804–1876).
