= Otto Friedrich Gruppe =

German philosopher

Otto Friedrich Gruppe (15 April 1804 – 7 January 1876) was a German philosopher, scholar-poet and philologist who served as secretary of the Prussian Academy of Arts in Berlin. Poems by Gruppe were set to music by Johannes Brahms, Richard Strauss, Karl Löwe, Elise Schmezer, and Franz Schreker. He rediscovered the cycle of Latin elegies by the Augustan poet Sulpicia and demonstrated their poetic value.

As a philosopher, he reacted against Hegel, his teacher in Berlin; his work was attacked by Karl Marx, and severely criticised by others. But Gruppe was rediscovered as a philosopher by Fritz Mauthner in an article on Gruppe printed in Maximilian Harden's Die Zukunft 22 (Berlin, 1913). More recently, Gruppe has been interpreted as a precursor of Wittgenstein by Hans Sluga in 1980; his Gegenwart und Zukunft der Philosophie in Deutschland (1855) was reprinted in 1996.

Gruppe was born in Danzig (Gdańsk) and died in Berlin. His son was the mythographer Otto Gruppe (1851–1901).
