= Harry Aiken Vincent =

American artist (1861-1931)

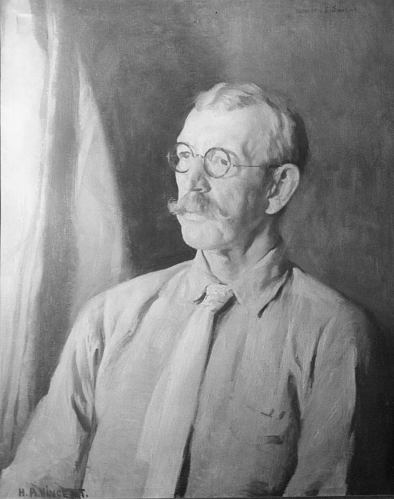
- Portrait of Harry Aiken Vincent by Howard Everett Smith ca 1920, National Portrait Gallery
- Born: 1861; Chicago, Illinois, U.S.
- Died: September 28, 1931 (aged 69–70); Rockport, Massachusetts, U.S.
- Known for: Painting
- Movement: Impressionism

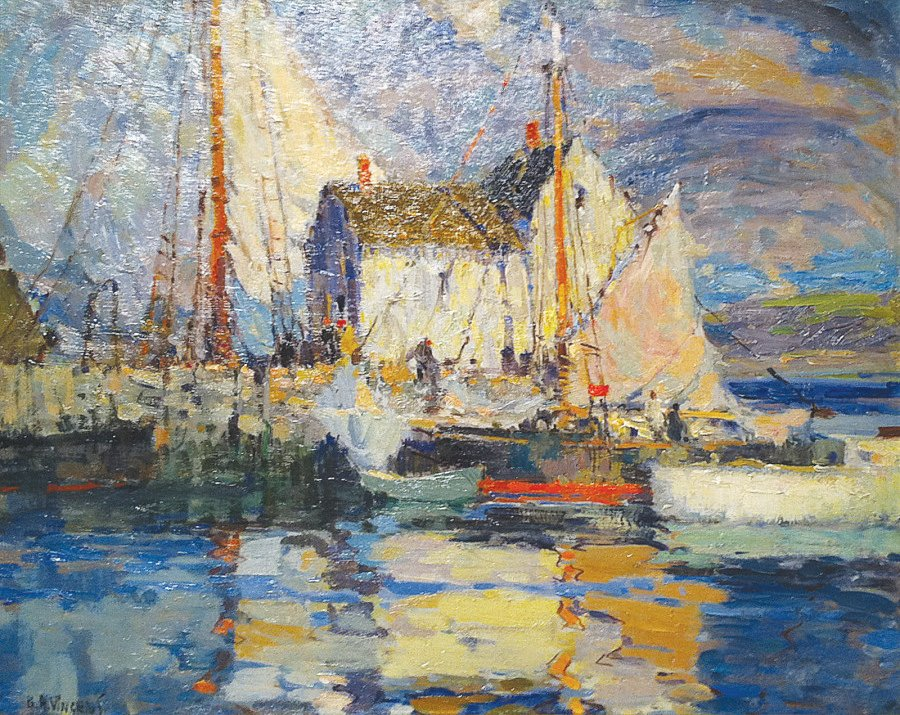
Drying the Sails after the Rain by Harry Aiken Vincent

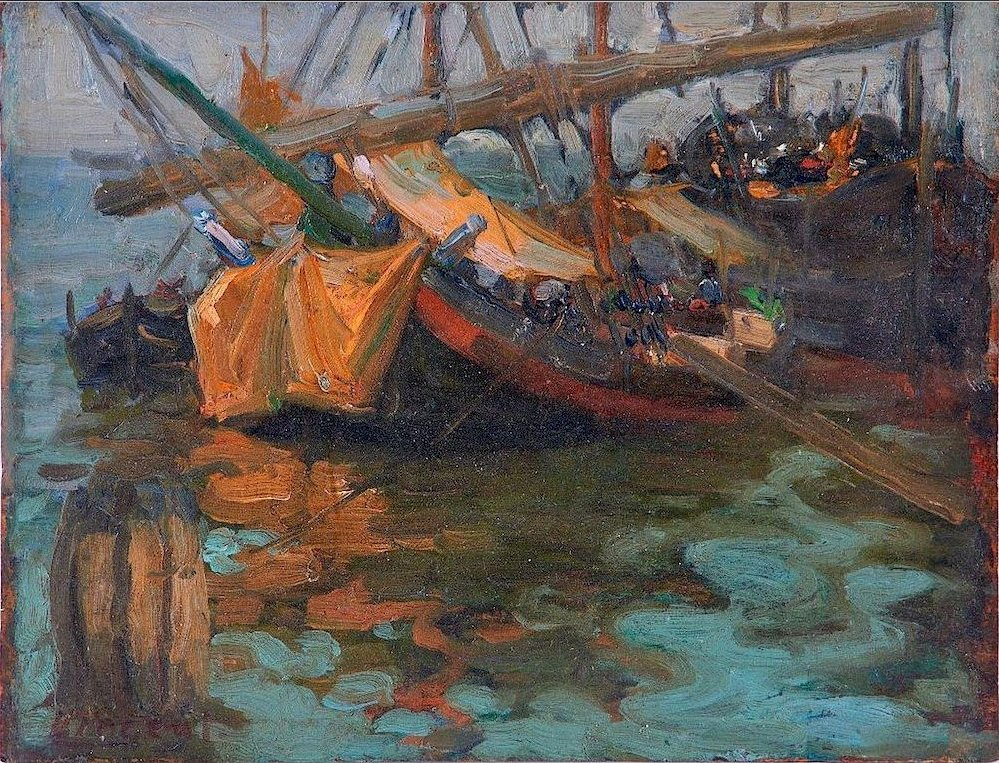
Venetian Fishing Boats by Harry Aiken Vincent

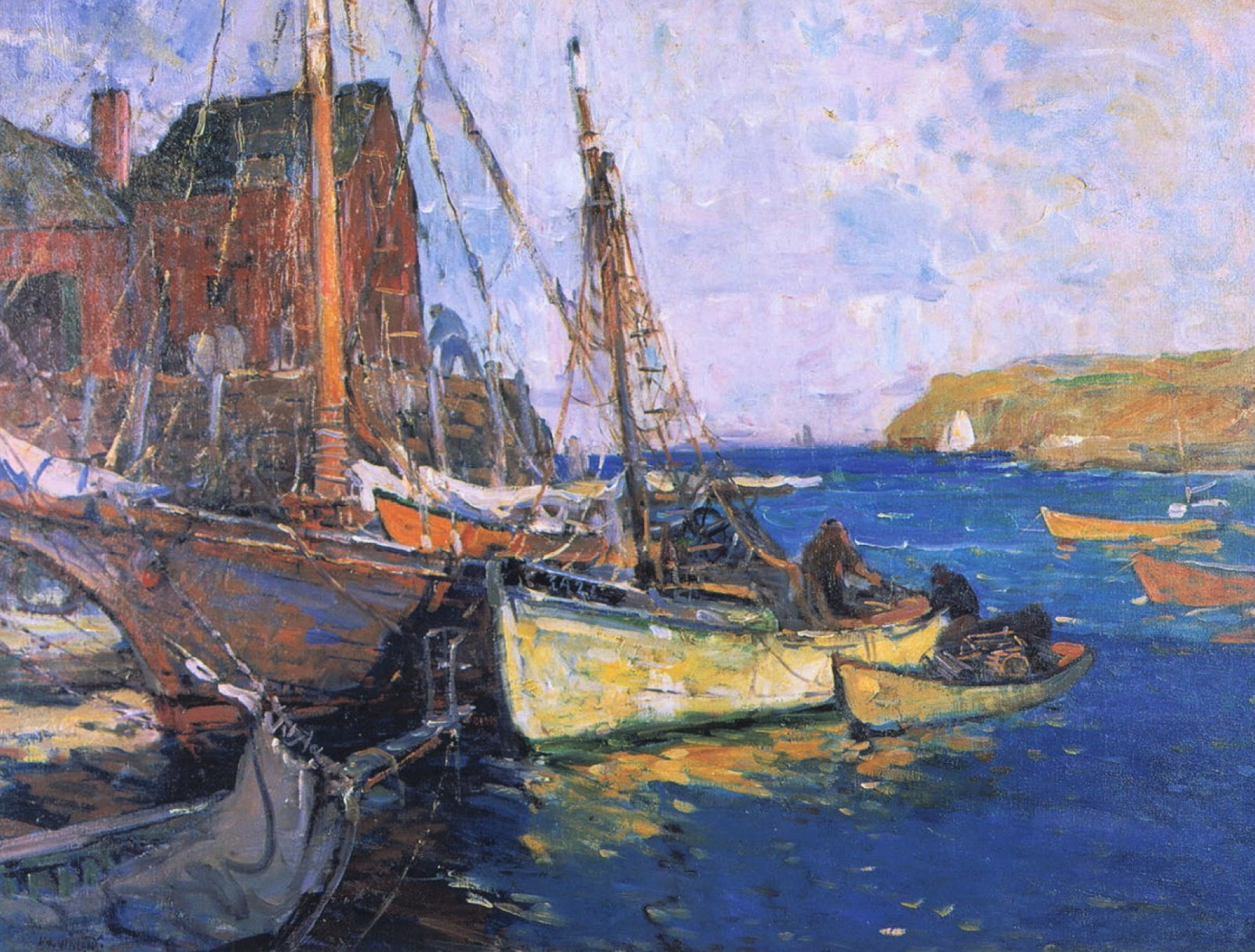
Harbor Scene by Harry Aiken Vincent

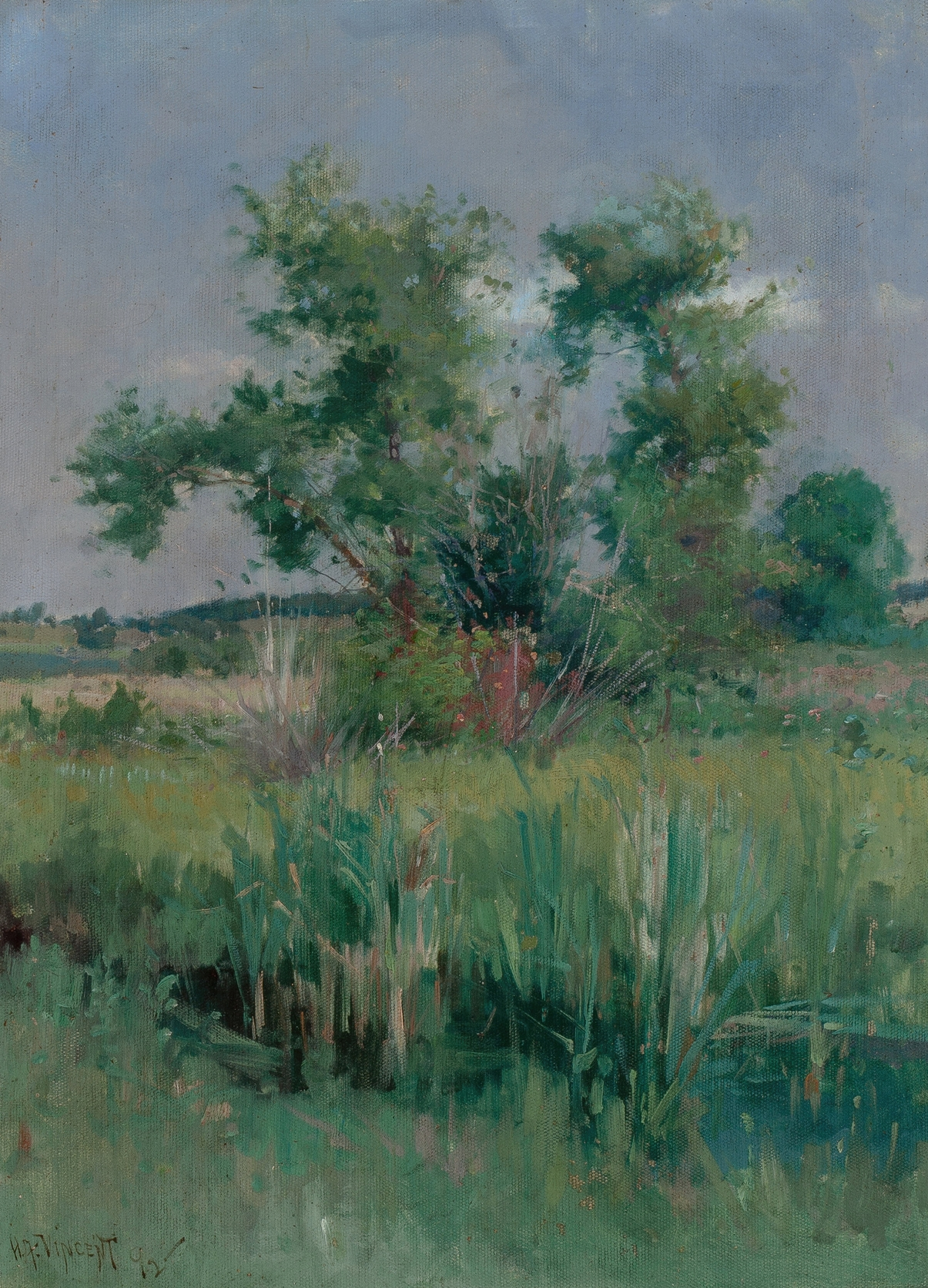
Impressionist view of trees and a stream by Harry Aiken Vincent, 1892

Harry Aiken Vincent (1861 – September 28, 1931) was a largely self-taught American artist known for his plein air landscape paintings.

Many of his oil paintings portray marine scenes at the start or end of the day, featuring boats and fishing activity in New England, particularly on Cape Ann, and in France. The treatment of water, sky, light and color in his works was representative of the American school of Impressionism. He was also skilled at watercolor and drawing in charcoal.

== Biography ==
Vincent was born in Chicago and began his artistic career working for Thomas G. Moses of Sosman and Landis as a scenic painter for theaters, creating elaborate backdrops.

His earliest known oil paintings often depicted rural scenes of towns and farms outside of Chicago. In 1893, he exhibited at the World's Colmbian Exposition in Chicago.

Vincent moved to the New York City area in the late 1890s, when his work increasingly drew the recognition of his peers and the attention of collectors. He maintained a studio at 155 West 29th Street in New York City between 1907 and 1917.

In 1907, he won the Shaw Prize awarded for a work in black and white by the Salmagundi Club. He also won the Turnbull Prize in 1918, and the Porter Prize in 1925. In 1928, he was recognized with the Samuel Twybill Shaw prize for watercolor. He also won the Paul L. Hammond prize given by the New York Watercolor Club for his painting Rockport Harbor.

In the latter part of his career, until his death on September 28, 1931, Vincent lived in Rockport, Massachusetts, on Atlantic Avenue facing the inner harbor. He became a respected senior member of the Rockport Art Association, which he helped to found in 1921, serving as its first president, and the North Shore Art Association. Like other Cape Ann artists, he created many views of Gloucester harbor, and interpretations of an iconic fish shack on a wharf in Rockport, known fondly as Motif Number 1. His obituary in the New York Times pointed to Vincent's paintings of the old lobster house as the inspiration for at least fifty other artists taking on the same subject. Street scenes and landscapes of the nearby granite quarries also attracted his eye, but he was continuously drawn to seaside settings, and scenes of daily life of fishermen and sailors, mending sails or unloading their catch.

In the 1920s, he found new subjects through travels in Europe, including England, Italy (Venice and Chioggia) and France (Saint-Tropez, Menton), as well as Morocco (Marrakech). The Pont-Aven artists' colony in Brittany had been popular with American and European painters in the late 19th and early 20th century. Vincent also found his way there and produced a series of scenes of Concarneau, a small fishing village.

=== Personal life ===
Vincent was married twice, to Catherine F. Ryan in Chicago in 1884, with whom he had two children, and then to Mildred Deitz in New York City in 1916.
