= Johanna Kinkel =

German composer, writer and educationist

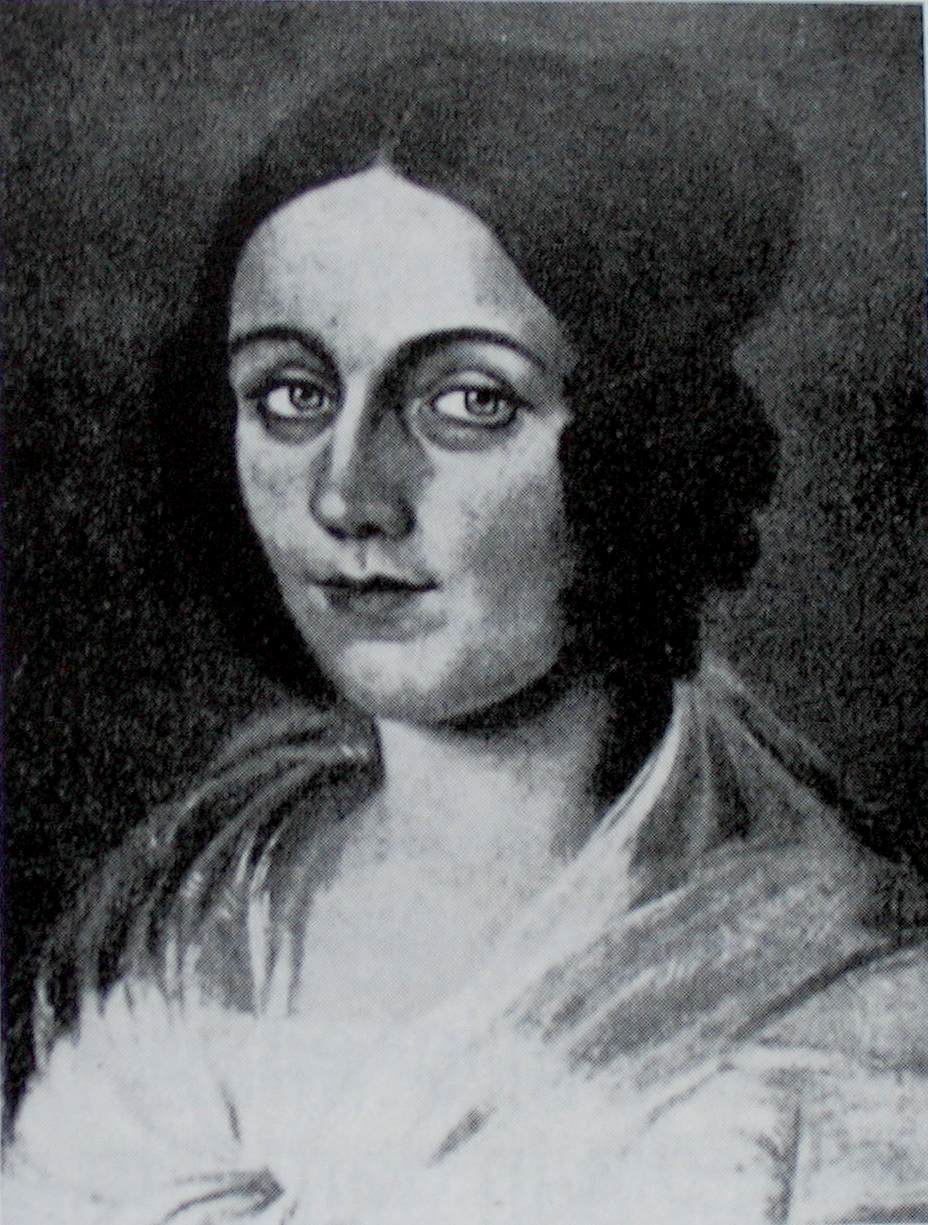
Johanna Kinkel

Johanna Kinkel (8 July 1810 – 15 November 1858), born Maria Johanna Mockel, was a German composer, writer, pedagogue, and revolutionary.

== Biography ==
Kinkel was born in Bonn to Catholic parents Marianna and Peter Joseph Mockel, a school teacher at the Bonner Lycée. She composed her first musical work, "The Bird Cantata" ("Die Vogelkantate"), op. 1, in 1829 for her musical society in Bonn and the work was published in 1838 by Trautwein. She spent a few years living and composing in Berlin, where she attended salons and formed friendships with women such as Bettina von Arnim and Fanny Hensel. She maintained a career as a published composer and writer as well as a music pedagogue throughout her life.

In 1832, Johanna Mockel married the 29 year old music and bookseller Johann Paul Matthieux. The marriage quickly turned restrictive and abusive as Matthieux forbade his young wife from any activity beyond her domestic duties and tyrannized her to her psychological limits.

In 1840, she was divorced from the Cologne bookseller Matthieux.

Her second marriage, in 1843, was to the German poet Gottfried Kinkel, with whom she had four children. Following the 1848 Revolutions she was forced to abandon Germany and flee to London. She was found dead in her garden in 1858 from a fall; although suicide was suspected, there was no way to verify this. Her tombstone was inscribed Freiheit, Liebe und Dichtung (meaning Freedom, Love, and Poetry).

Kinkel was an author of considerable merit. She wrote on musical subjects, including regular review articles of music events for the Bonner Zeitung, a newspaper she and her husband edited in cooperation with Carl Schurz. An autobiographical novel of hers, Hans Ibeles in London, was published posthumously in 1860. She also had a substantial output of musical compositions. Many of these compositions were written for the Maikäferbund (Maikäfer Group — the Maikäfer being the beetle Melolontha melolontha which emerges from the ground in May), a group of poets which she directed and Gottfried also helped lead. This group was founded in 1840 and lasted until the 1848 revolution. It had an annual festival. She also wrote music for her children which was published.

In 1853, the German composer Elise Schmezer premiered her opera Otto der Schütz, which was based on earlier works by Alexandre Dumas and Johanna Kinkel.

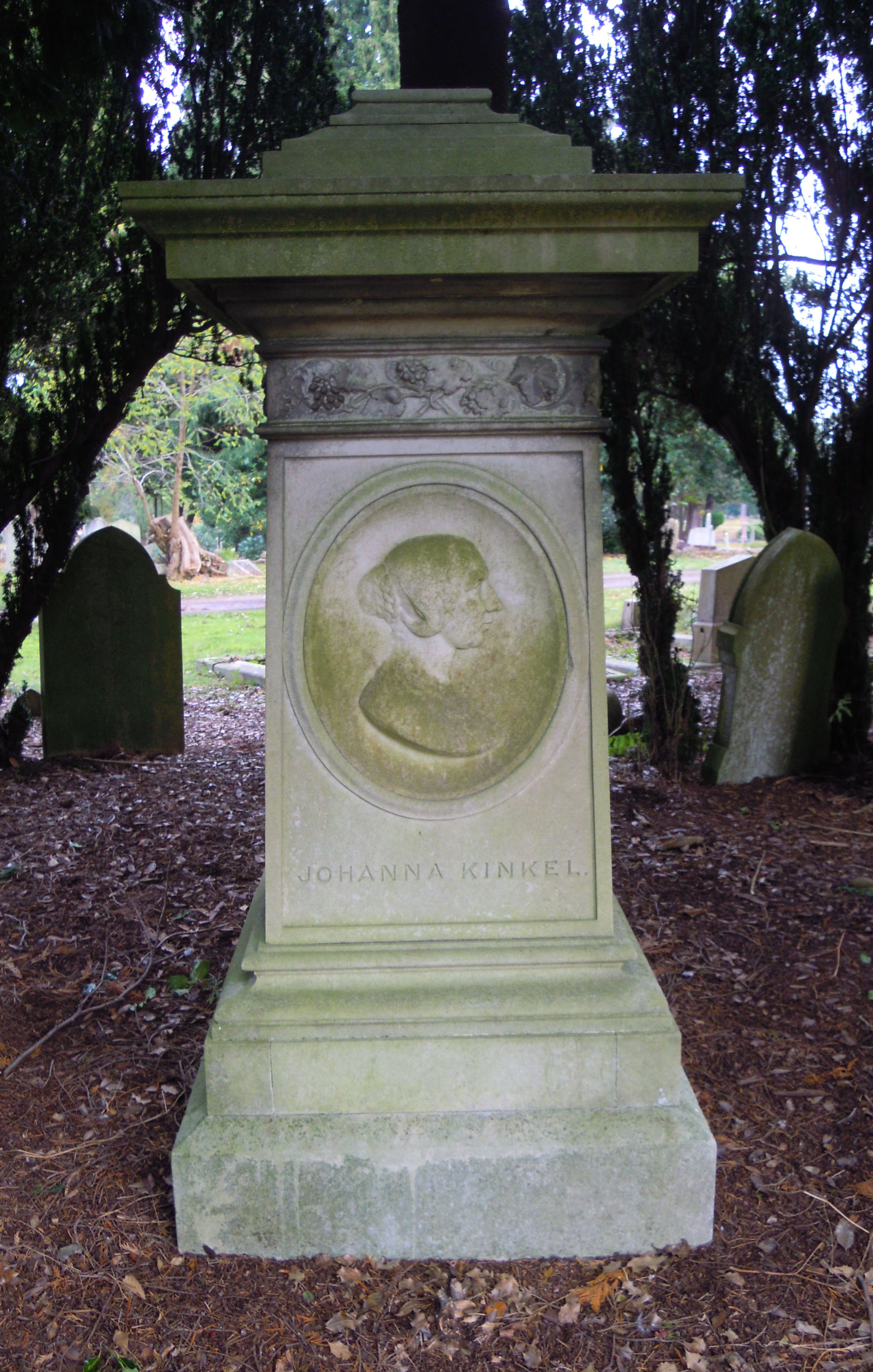
Kinkel's grave in Brookwood Cemetery

She died on 15 November 1858 in London and is buried in Brookwood Cemetery with her daughters Marie Kinkel (January–February 1861) and Johanna Kinkel (1845–1863).
