= Aldro Hibbard =

American painter (1886 – 1972)

Aldro T. Hibbard
- Born: August 25, 1886; Falmouth, Massachusetts, US
- Died: November 12, 1972 (aged 86); Rockport, Massachusetts, US
- Education: School of the Museum of Fine Arts at Tufts
- Known for: Landscape Painting

Aldro Thompson Hibbard (August 25, 1886 – November 12, 1972) was an American plein air painter known for his landscape paintings, particularly his winter scenes in Vermont. Hibbard primarily worked with oil paint, as he found watercolor difficult to use during the winter months in the Vermont mountains. He spent much of his life in Rockport, Massachusetts.

== Early life ==
Aldro Hibbard was born on August 25, 1886 in Falmouth, Massachusetts, to James Thompson Hibbard and Katherine Swift. He had an elder sister, Adeline Hibbard. Raised in the Boston suburbs of Roxbury and Dorchester, Hibbard graduated from Dorchester High School in 1906, where he was captain of the baseball team.

During his youth, he spent summers with his family in Falmouth, Massachusetts. Between 1911 and 1916, he played baseball for the Cottage Club, later known as Falmouth's town team, which subsequently became part of the Cape Cod Baseball League.

Hibbard enrolled in the Massachusetts Normal Art School (now the Massachusetts College of Art and Design) in 1909, where he studied with Ernest Lee Major, Joseph DeCamp, and Frederic Andrew Bosley, painters known for their portraits and still-life works. Hibbard commuted daily from Dorchester, Boston, to attend classes six days a week and also took night classes. Hibbard completed the four-year program in three years and, in 1909, enrolled at the School of the Museum of Fine Arts Boston, which is now known as the School of the Museum of Fine Arts at Tufts, to continue his studies.

At the Museum School, he studied under Frank Weston Benson, Phillip Leslie Hale, and Edmund Charles Tarbell, instructors associated with the American Impressionist movement. After four years of study, Hibbard graduated in 1913 and received the Paige Traveling Scholarship.

With funding to travel to Europe, Hibbard departed Boston aboard the SS Arabic in September 1913, bound for Cobh, Ireland. He traveled through England, France, Spain, Morocco, and Italy, where he studied and sketched works by European masters, exploring both urban and rural landscapes.

Following the outbreak of World War I, Hibbard returned to England and, in November 1914, boarded the SS Arabic to bound for Boston.

== Career ==
The National Academy of Design awarded Hibbard the 1922 First Hallgarten Prize for Late February and the 1928 Second Altman Prize for Snow Mantle. He also received gold medals from the Pennsylvania Academy of the Fine Arts in 1922, 1927, and 1931.

Hibbard collaborated with other artists, including Charles R. Knapp and Harry Aiken Vincent, to establish the Rockport Art Association. He served as the association's president for over 20 years. In addition to his leadership role, he founded the Hibbard School of Painting in Rockport, where he taught during the summers. He spent some of his winters painting in Vermont.

Hibbard was a member of several American art organizations, including the Rockport Art Association and the North Shore Art Association. He was a National Academician of the National Academy of Design, receiving the title 'Associate National Academician' in 1923 and 'National Academician' in 1933.

== Legacy ==
His paintings, associated with the Boston School, are held in the collections of several museums, including the Museum of Fine Arts Boston, the Currier Museum of Art, the Portland Museum of Art, and the Whistler House Museum of Art. Some of Hibbard's paintings have been sold through the Invaluable auction site.

On February 3, 2012, Hibbard's painting Winter in New England was sold at Skinner Auctioneers and Appraisers for $88,875, exceeding its estimated value of $25,000-$35,000.

== Death ==
Hibbard died on November 12, 1972.

== Sources ==
- A.T. Hibbard, N.A.: Artist in Two Worlds, by John L. Cooley, published 1968.
- Rockport Sketchbook, by John L. Cooley, published 1965.
- "Aldro T. Hibbard, Painter of New England Winters", American Artist, June 1940.
- "The Legacy of Cape Ann," by James Keny, American Art Review, Oct./Nov. 1995.
- "A New View of Aldro Hibbard", by Charles Movalli, American Artist, May 1979.
- Art For All, The Cape Ann School, by Lisa B. Martin.
- The Inspiration of Cape Ann, by Tom Davies, Rockport Art Association, 1993.
- Gloucester, Views of the Art Colony by American Masters, by R.H. Love, R.H. Love Galleries, Oct./Nov. 1991
