= North Shore Art Association =

Coordinates: 42°36′33.1″N 70°39′6.9″W

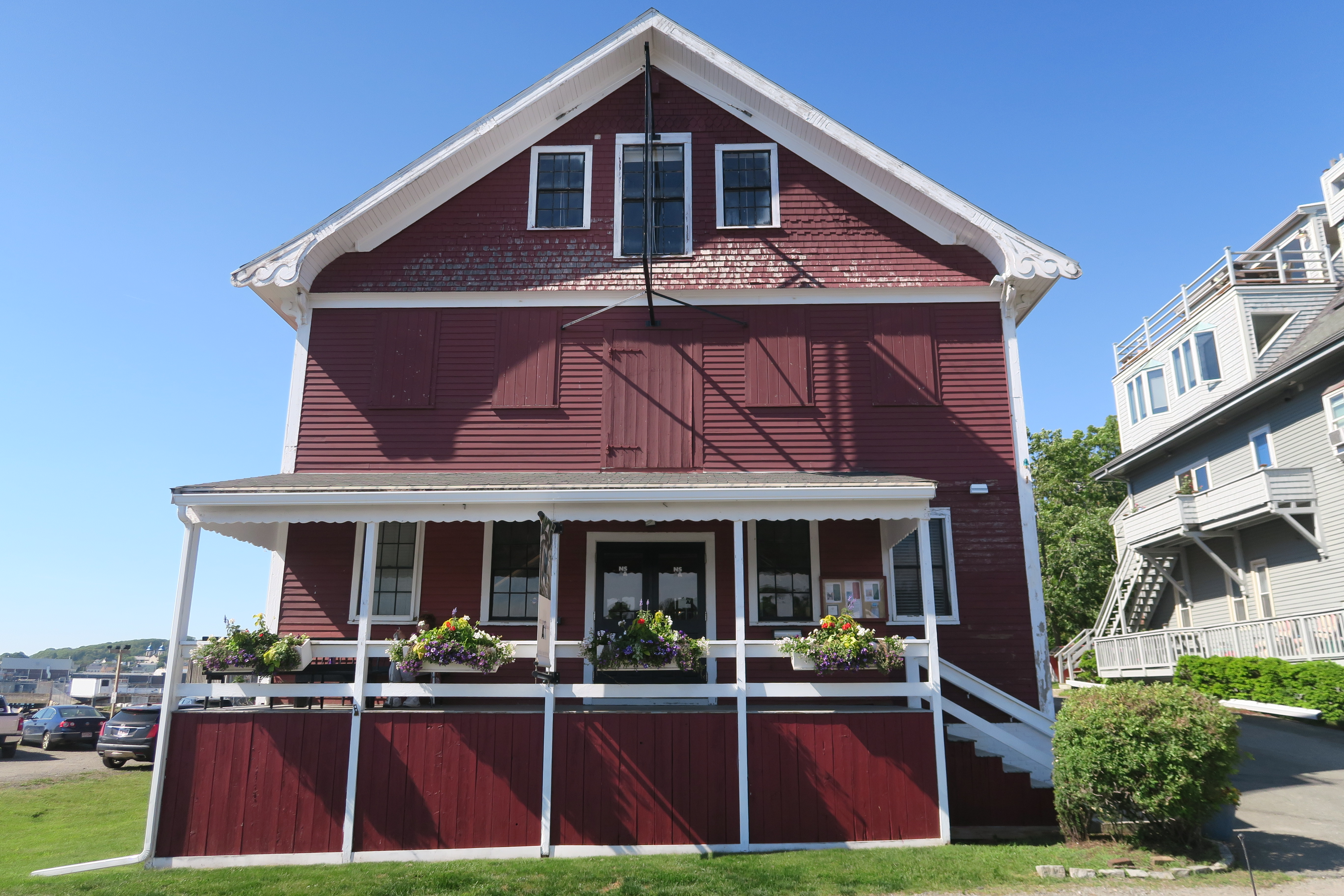
The North Shore Art Association

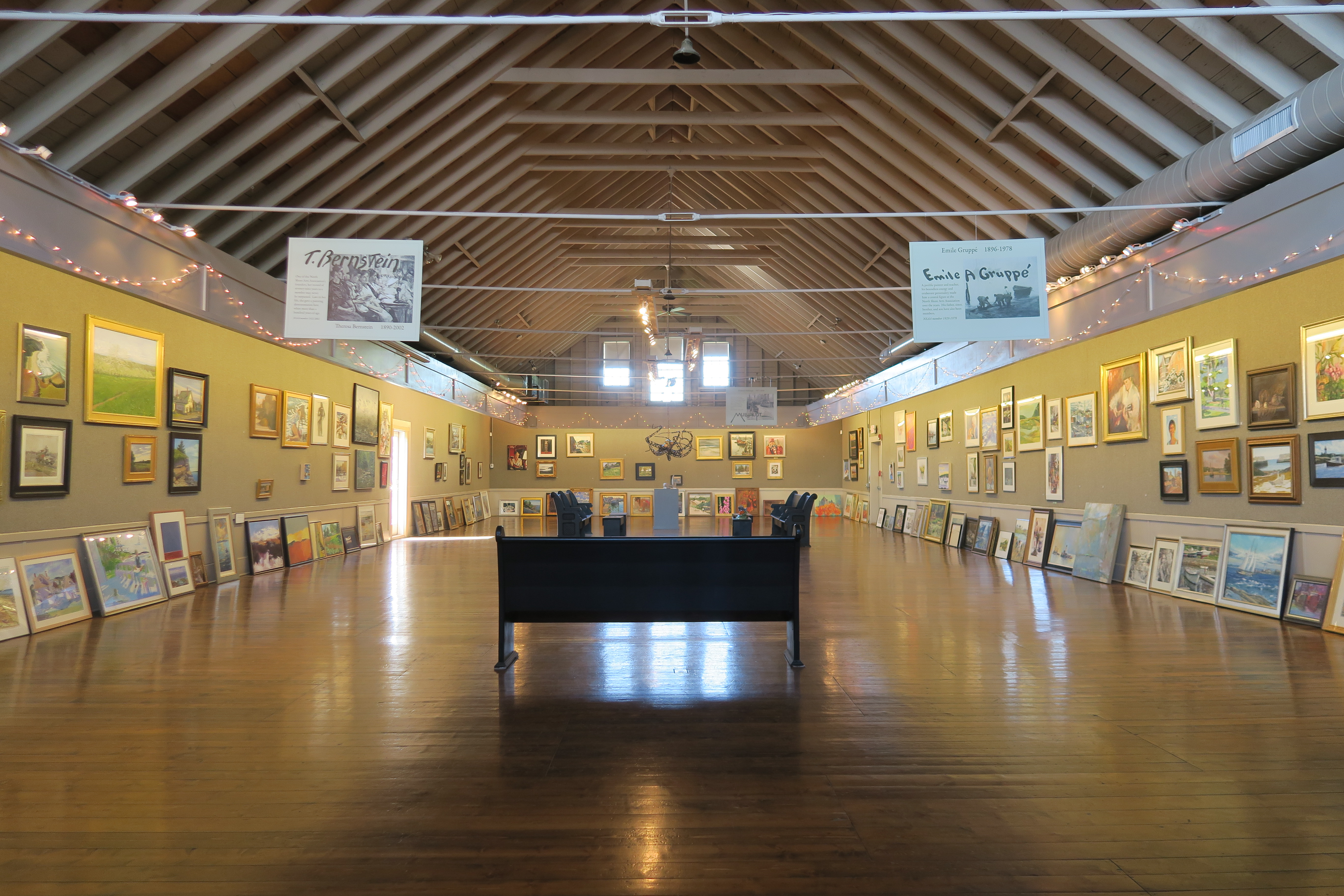
Upstairs Main Gallery

The North Shore Art Association of East Gloucester, Massachusetts is one of the oldest art associations in the United States. Founded in 1922, it was the gathering place of some of the great American artists of the 20th century.

Childe Hassam, Emile Gruppe, Harry Aiken Vincent, Paul Strisik, Fredrick Mulhaupt, Winslow Homer and many others were early members of the NSAA. Other members include Louise Herreshoff.
