= Rockport Art Association =

Rockport Art Association is an art association in the United States. It started as an artist's cooperative and became a gathering place of New England artists of the 20th century. The artists Aldro Hibbard, Antonio Cirino, Paul Strisik, Anthony Thieme, W. Lester Stevens and Harry Aiken Vincent were contemporaries closely tied to its early days.

== Information ==
The Rockport Art Association was founded in 1921. Its history has expanded over the past 100 years. In 1921, a group of artists that were attracted to the seaside village of Rockport decided to form the association. The association began in the previous art studio of Aldro T. Hibbard. The Rockport Art Association is commonly called by its acronym of RAA. RAA was originally established as an artist cooperative for art lovers and creators. In the year of 1929, the Rockport Art Association had been placed in its permanent location of an Old Tavern building on Main Street. The RAA had taken location in a sea captain’s house and over the years it has also been an inn, a tavern, and a stage coach stop before it was founded in its permanent location. The RAA currently has over 280 artist and photography members.

The Rockport Art Association has a museum collection that includes paintings, graphics and sculpture representing a pictorial history of life and art on Cape Ann and beyond. The RAA is also known to hold several special events, exhibitions, and educational series Such as artist painting demonstrations and plein air workshops, a National Art Exhibition feature diverse works from across the country. RAA has evolved into RAA&M< ROckport Art Association & Museum. This allows for a balance between exhibits featuring artist members, contributing members and the Pieces from the collection of over 700 works. More information can be found on the website: RockportArtAssn.org
