= Stube =

Alpine and Italian traditional living area

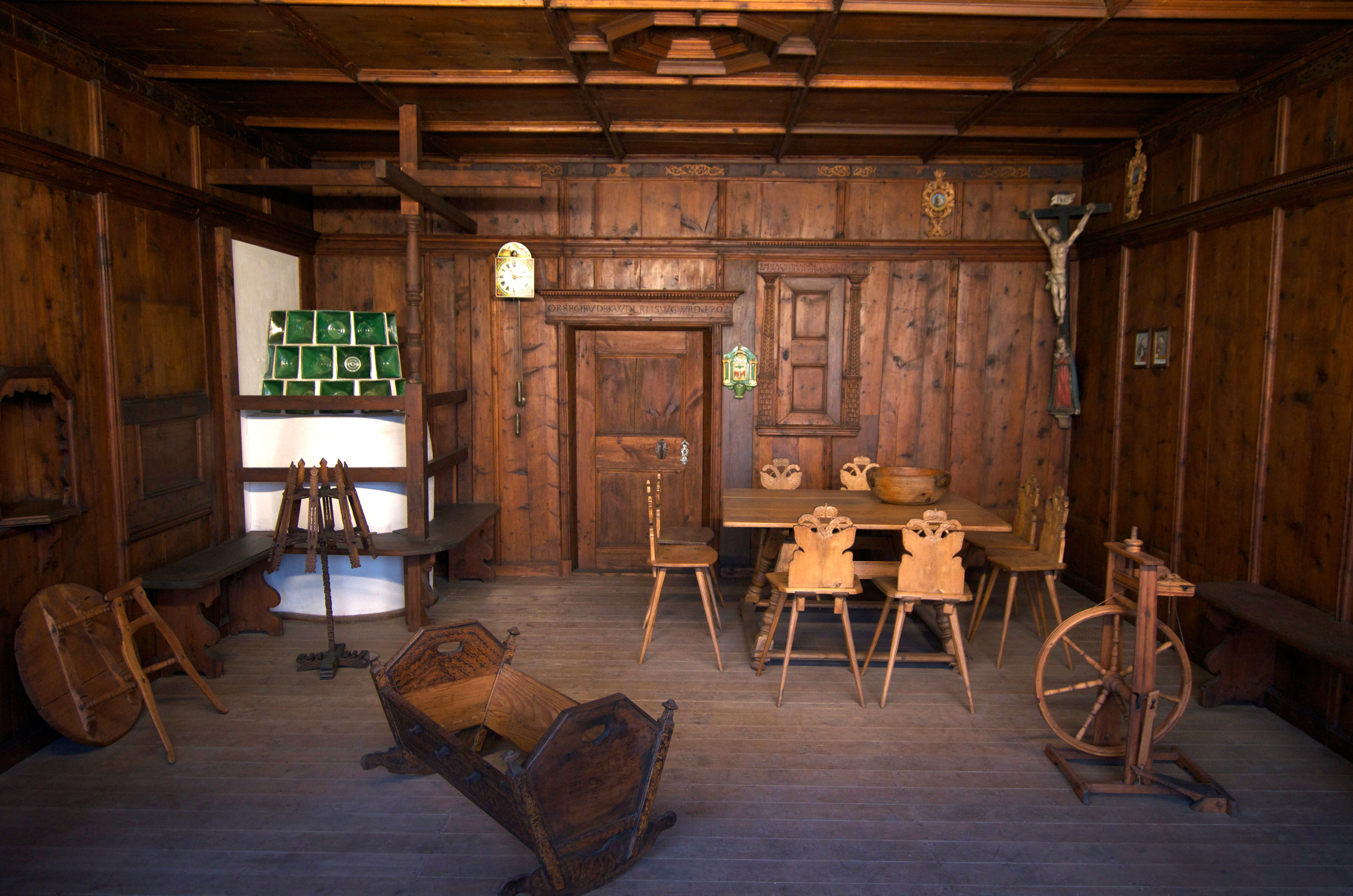
A stube at the Germanisches Nationalmuseum in Nuremberg.

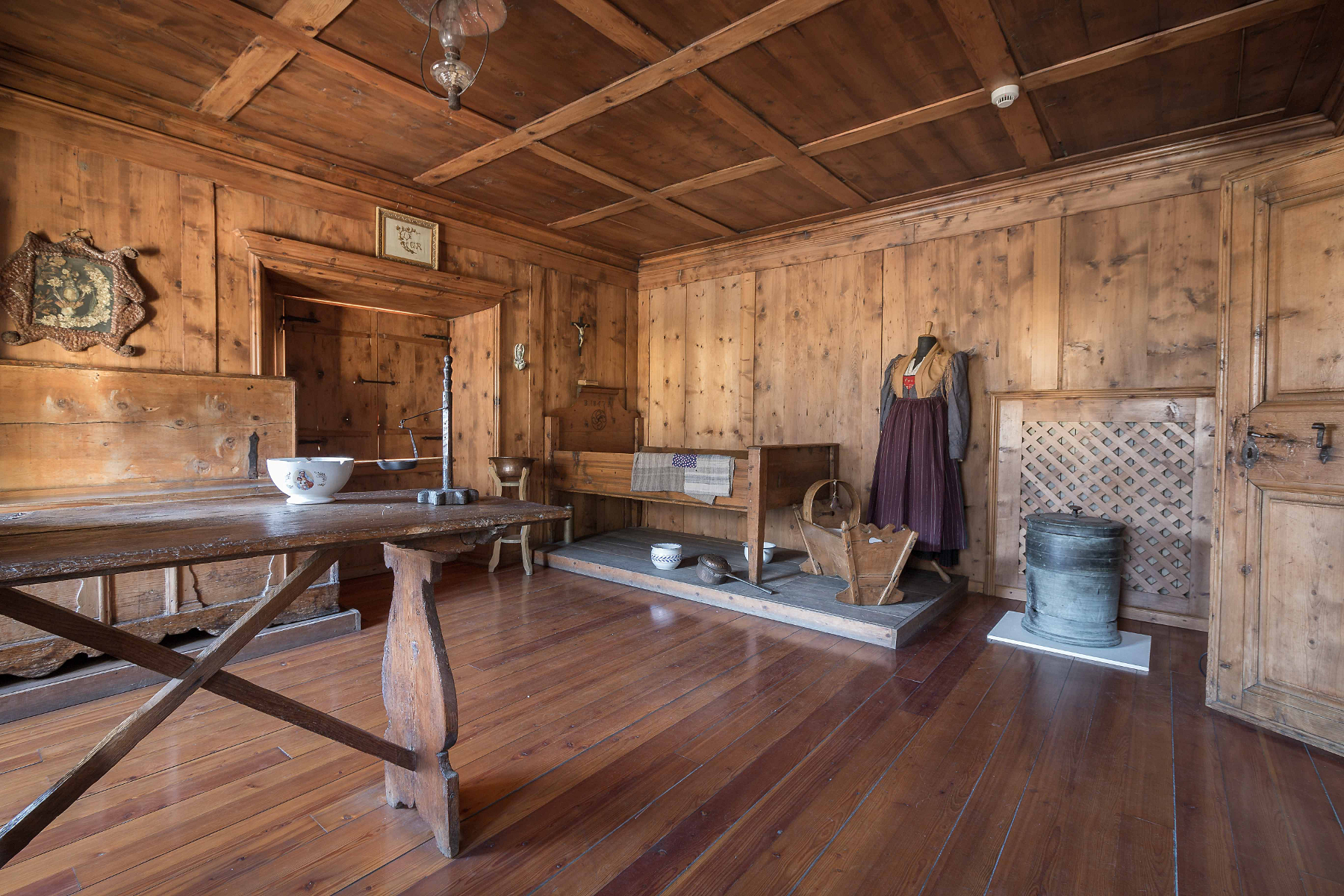
A stüa at the Museo Etnografico Tiranese, Lombardy

A stube (stiva (Romansh), stüa (Ladin and Lombard)) is the traditional living area of the German-speaking Alpine areas (Austria, Germany, Switzerland), and the Italian regions of Valtellina, South Tyrol, Trentino and Ladinia.

It is a room heated by a large stone- or tile-covered stove and entirely lined with wood to keep the heat inside; the woods mostly used for the wall panels are chestnut, walnut, spruce, and Swiss pine. The logs are inserted into the stove through a small door that opens on an adjacent room, usually the kitchen or the corridor.

In the beginning, the term stube was used to indicate a room heated by a stove where the family would gather to chat, sew, weave, pray, and even sleep. Beyond their original function, during the Middle Ages, richly decorated stüe quickly became status symbols, serving as a "state room" in noble houses, where guests were welcomed, private or community notarial deeds were drawn up, and meetings were held.

In another sense derived from the concept of "heated room", it used to refer to a bathing room, giving rise to the German occupational surnames Stübler/Stubler, Stüberer, Stübner, Stuber for "stube-keeper". The word is also part of a number of compound words, for rooms of some specific kind, such as Bierstube, "beer hall", etc., see wikt:Stube.

== See also ==
- Parlor
