= Preparing for the Matinee =

1907 painting by Edmund C. Tarbell

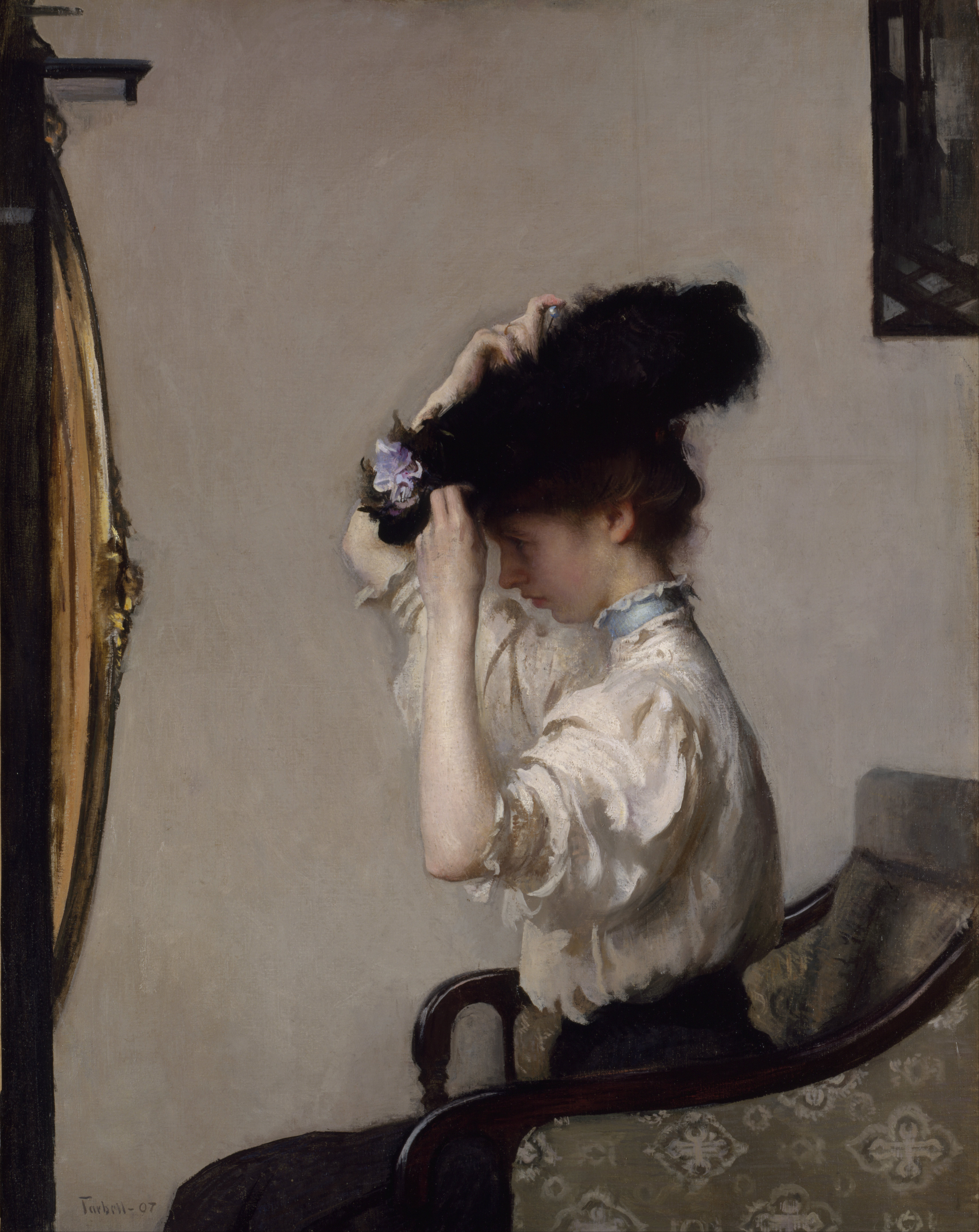
- Artist: Edmund C. Tarbell
- Year: 1907
- Medium: oil on canvas
- Dimensions: 116 cm × 90 cm (45.5 in × 35.5 in)
- Location: Indianapolis Museum of Art

Preparing for the Matinee is an oil painting by American artist Edmund C. Tarbell, created in 1907. It is currently part of the permanent collection at the Indianapolis Museum of Art.

== Description ==
A young woman, identified as Charlotte Barton of Boston, sits in a green patterned chair, adjusting her pearl-tipped hatpin in a gilded mirror. A corner of Vermeer’s The Music Lesson can be seen in the upper right corner. She is dressed very elegantly, and, as suggested by the title, is going out to the matinee. The loose brushstrokes of her shirt, hair, and hat are elegantly contrasted with the solidness of the chair she is sitting in.

== Historical information ==
Born, raised, and educated in and around the Boston, Massachusetts area, Tarbell was interested in the lives of the women who lived in the area. Tarbell was the leader of the Boston School, a group of artists who painted women in interior and exterior settings, usually active in mundane, domestic activities. Using impressionist techniques, they bring to life these seemingly dull activities with their lively brushstrokes. Tarbell concentrated on the world of upper-class women, depicting them elegantly in the latest fashions. These women exemplified the Boston Brahmin lifestyle.

=== Acquisition ===
The painting was originally purchased by Washington University in St. Louis in 1909, and loaned to the City Art Museum. It was sold by the Kende Galleries in New York in 1945 to the J.W. Young Art Gallery at Chicago. John G. Rauch of Indianapolis purchased the painting from the gallery, and his wife subsequently donated it to the Indianapolis Museum of Art in 1982.
