= Stuber =

Stuber, Stueber, Stüber may refer to:

- Stüber, historical coin in several German regions from the 15th century to the early 19th century
- Stuber (surname)
- 58499 Stüber, asteroid
- Stuber–Stone Building, in Detroit, Michigan
- Stuber (film), 2019 American action comedy film
