= Stuber (surname) =

Stuber, Stueber, Stüber is a German-language surname of two possible origins: one from a place named Stuben, another is the occupations of bath-keeper. Notable people with the surname include:

- Abe Stuber (1903-1989), American football player and coach of football and basketball
- Andrew Stueber (born 1999), American football player
- Christine Stüber-Errath, German former figure skater
- Dedrick Brandes Stuber, American painter
- Emmett Stuber (1904–1989), American football coach
- Georges Stuber (1925–2006), Swiss football goalkeeper
- Marguerite Stuber Pearson (1898-1978), American artist
- Ruth Stuber Jeanne (1910–2004), American marimbist, percussionist, violinist, and arranger
- Scott Stuber, American film producer
- Werner Stuber (1900–1957), Swiss Olympic horserider

== See also ==
- Steuber, a surname of different origin, indicating the occupation of miller
