= Matinée =

Matinée may refer to:

== Film and television ==
- Matinee (1993 film), an American comedy film by Joe Dante
- Matinee (2012 film), an Indian film by Aneesh Upasana
- "Matinee" (Wonder Man), an episode of Wonder Man

== Music ==
- Matinée (album), a 2007 release by Jack Peñate
- "The Dark of the Matinée", also known as "Matinée", a 2004 song by Franz Ferdinand

== Other uses ==
- Matinée (disco), alcohol-free discothèques for teenagers in South America
- Matinee, a machinima production software tool
- Matinee, a necklace length approximately 20–24 inches

== See also ==
- Matinée idol
