= Denman Ross =

American painter and art professor

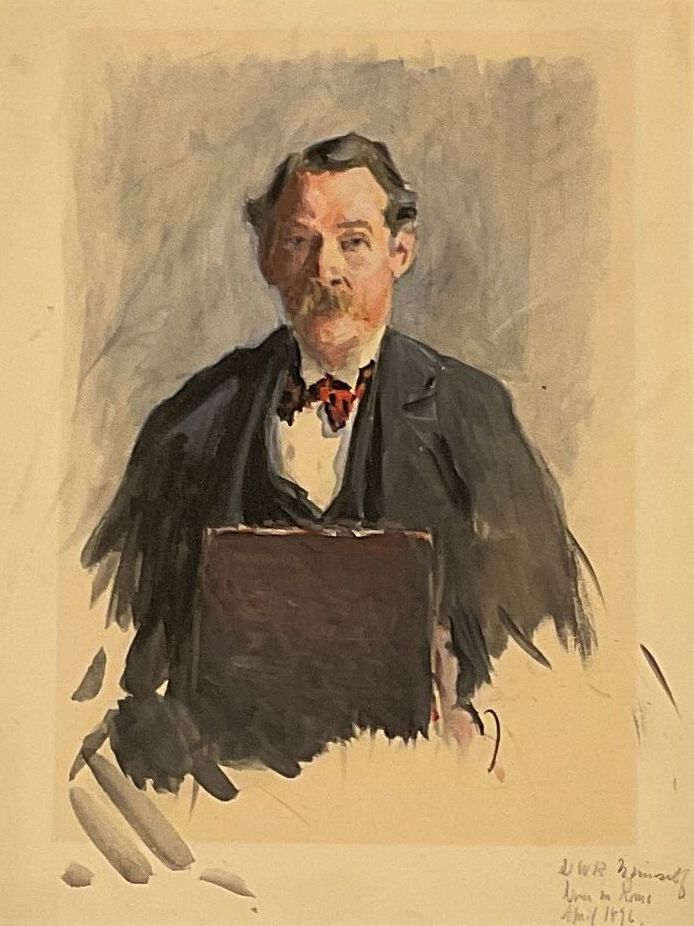
- Self-portrait, 1896
- Born: Denman Waldo Ross; January 10, 1853; Cincinnati, Ohio, US
- Died: September 12, 1935 (aged 82); London, England
- Resting place: Mount Auburn Cemetery, Cambridge, Massachusetts, US
- Education: Harvard University
- Occupations: Art historian, art collector, painter, educator

Denman Waldo Ross (January 10, 1853 – September 12, 1935) was an American painter, art collector, and scholar of art history and theory. He was a lecturer on art and design at Harvard University and a trustee of the Museum of Fine Arts, Boston.

== Early life and education ==
Ross was born in Cincinnati, Ohio to John Ludlow Ross, a wealthy businessman, and Fanny Walker Ross (née Waldo). (Note: The Ross family was established in America in 1664 by George Ross, who had been banished from Scotland as a religious dissenter. The Waldo family can be traced back to Cornelius Waldo, who was living in Ipswich, Massachusetts by 1647.) He had two older siblings who died before he was born.

At the outbreak of the Civil War in 1861, the family moved to Boston, joining John Ross's brother Matthias Denman Ross and his wife Mary, who was Fanny Ross's sister, at their house at 76 Boylston St., across from Boston Common.

Ross was enrolled at an elementary school in Newton Corner. When his father's business took the family to New York City in 1862, Ross was tutored at home by his cousin Louise Nathurst, who was seven years his senior. By 1868, the family was living with M. Denman Ross in Jamaica Plain and the younger Ross entered Charles Knapp Dillaway's preparatory school, whose curriculum was designed for Harvard aspirants.

In 1871, Ross matriculated at Harvard College. His father bought a house at 24 Craigie St., a few blocks from the school, and Denman lived at home. He studied history with Henry Adams and received a bachelor's degree in 1875, graduating with honors in history and election to Phi Beta Kappa.

Ross resumed his studies at Harvard as a post-graduate in the fall of 1876. For his thesis, Studies in the Early History of Institutions, he received a PhD in History in 1880.

== Career ==
Ross came to be interested in art soon after this, and began teaching courses in design and art theory at Harvard by 1889. Ross would spend much of the rest of his life lecturing on these and related topics, working with the Museum of Fine Arts, Boston on their burgeoning Oriental Art department, and traveling the world in search of artworks to add to his personal collection. Ross was also a member of some of Boston's elite inner circles, and is known to have brushed elbows not only with other prominent people associated with the Museum of Fine Arts and the art world, but also with the likes of Louis Brandeis, John Singer Sargent, Joseph Lindon Smith, Isabella Stewart Gardner and various members of Boston's most prominent families.

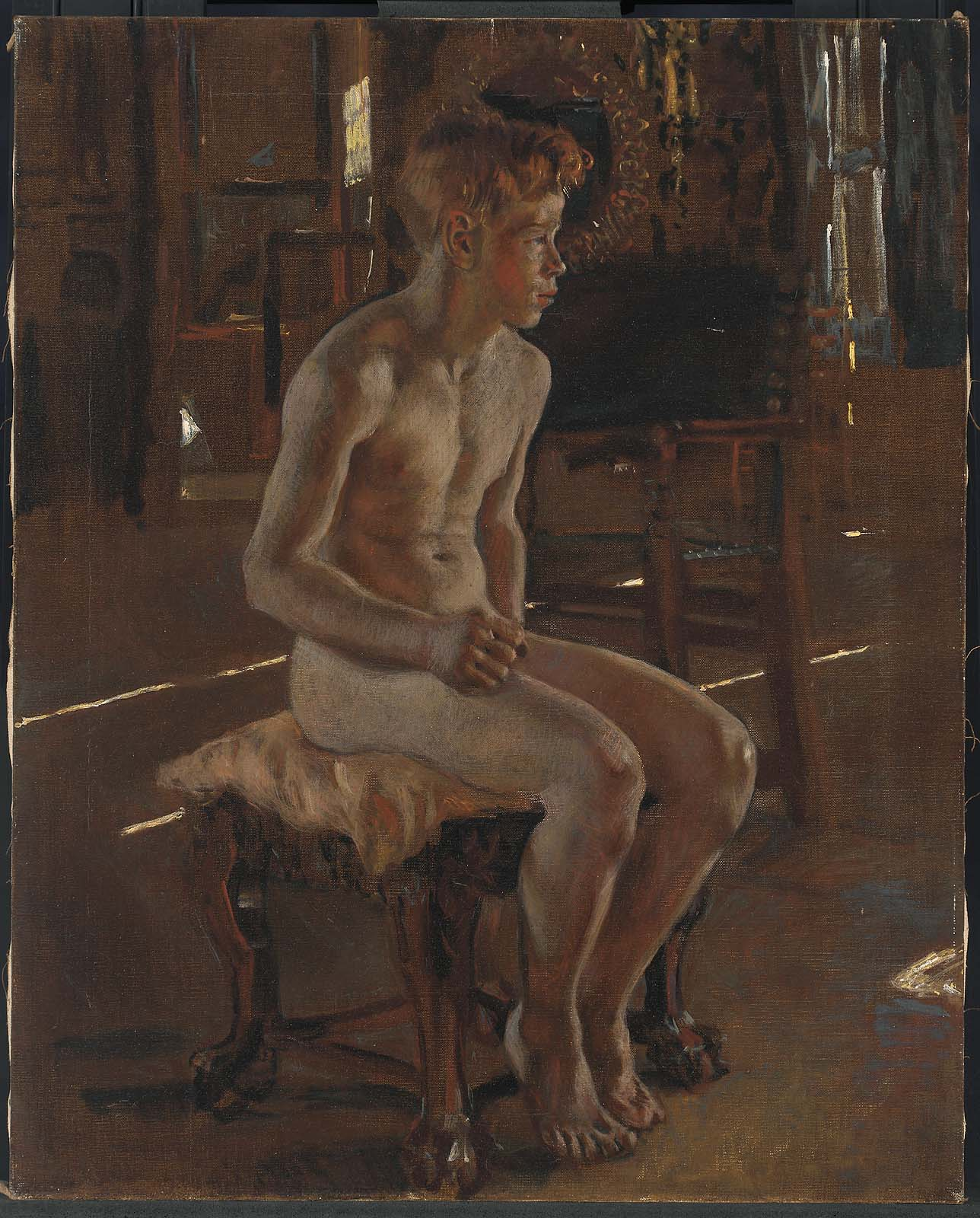
A Study of Cross-lights, c. 1910

A number of his students at Harvard, the Museum of Fine Arts, and elsewhere he lectured, went on to become prominent artists. Hyman Bloom and Jack Levine were among these, as was Marie Danforth Page. The collection of objects donated by Ross to the Museum of Fine Arts over the course of his career as a collector covers a wide geographical, chronological, and material diversity. He collected a myriad of European art objects, along with a great many Chinese and Japanese paintings and textiles.

In 1907, he published a manual of design : "A Theory of Pure Design: Harmony, Balance, Rhythm" by Houghton-Mifflin and co. and he contributed essays on design to magazines including Photo Era.

== Business ==
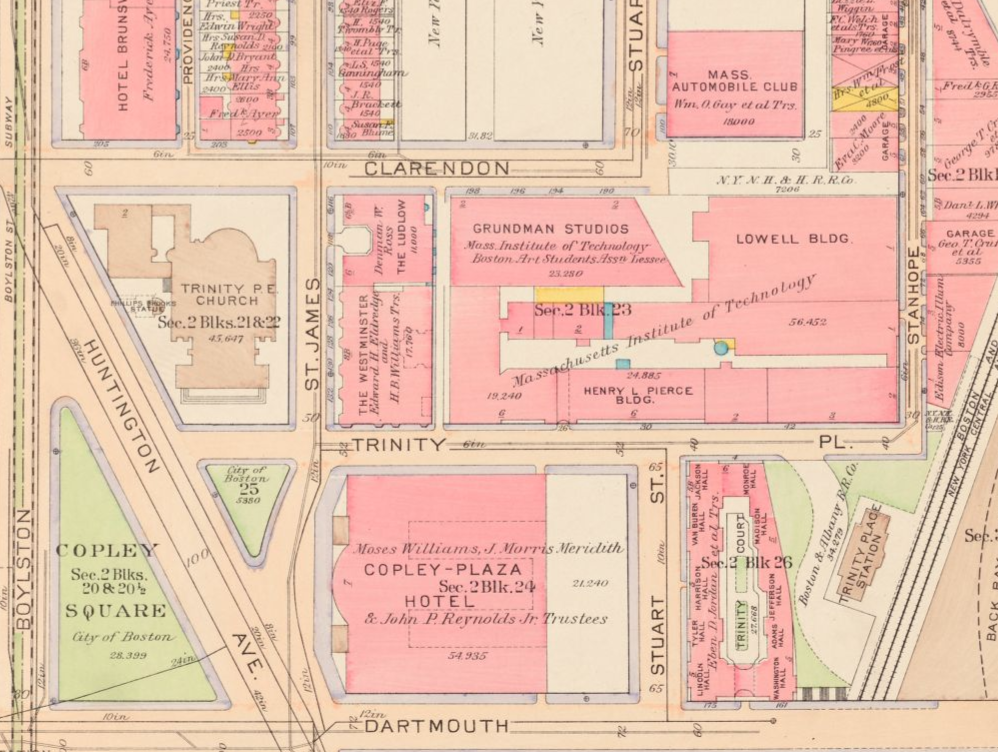
Ross's Hotel Ludlow in Copley Square.

Although Ross did not enter into any of the family businesses, he did make one venture into property development. His father and uncle gave him a piece of property in Copley Square, on the corner of Clarendon St. and St. James Ave., across from Trinity Church and close to the new Museum of Fine Arts. Ross spent two years planning a residential hotel; the Hotel Ludlow, christened with his father's middle name, opened in 1889.

The six–story Romanesque Revival building contained about thirty rooms and suites, plus a dining room for residents. The top floor contained an apartment for his friend Joseph Lindon Smith and family, with a studio that could accommodate twelve students and a woodworking shop for Smith's brother and father, who made picture frames.

The Ludlow was financially successful; Ross used the profits to buy more art which he exhibited in the hotel, causing Smith to refer to it as the "Palazzo Rossi". The building was demolished sometime between 1938 and 1945.

== Death ==
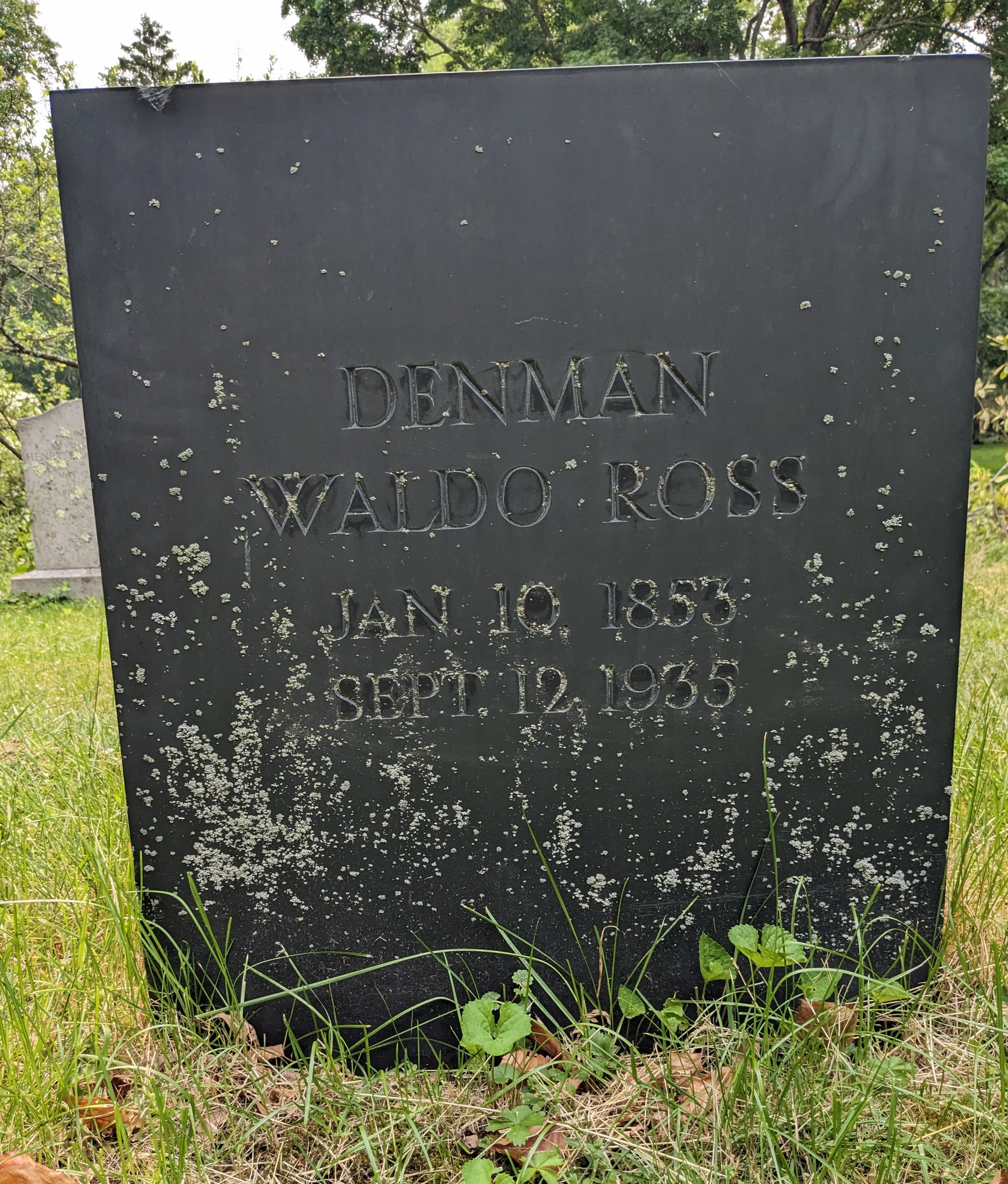
Denman Waldo Ross headstone

On September 12, 1935, Ross died at the Savoy Hotel in London of a cerebral hemorrhage that he had suffered three days earlier; he and his assistant Arthur E. Brown had been in Europe for several months. Ross was cremated and his ashes were placed in a Tang dynasty burial urn, a gift from Messrs. Yamanaka, dealers in Chinese and Japanese antiques who had been personal friends. Ross's ashes were returned to Cambridge and interred in the family plot in Mount Auburn Cemetery.

== Legacy ==
By collecting and sharing what he believed to be the best examples of world art, Ross put into practice his philosophy that great art should be available to everyone. Over a span of forty years, Ross donated over eleven thousand items to the Museum of Fine Arts, Boston (MFA) and nine thousand items to the Fogg Museum at Harvard.

Donations to the MFA include a stone head from Angkor Wat, a set of ukiyo-e folding screen paintings of Kyoto's pleasure quarters, and a number of Chinese Buddhist steles and paintings. Patrica Ross Pratt notes three gifts that were particularly significant.

- Torso of a fertility goddess (yakshi), from the Great Stupa at Sanchi. Indian, Sunga period, 25 B.C. – A.D. 25. Purchased in Paris in 1913.
- Seated bodhisattva, Chinese, Eastern Wei dynasty, about A.D. 530. Also purchased in Paris in 1913.
- The thirteen emperors scroll Attributed to Yan Liben (Chinese, about 600–673) Tang dynasty, second half of the 7th century C.E..

The MFA established the Denman Waldo Ross Society in 2003 to honor individuals, corporations, and foundations who assist with the continued growth and enhancement of the museum's world-renowned collections.

== Selected bibliography ==
- Ross, Denman W. (1880). Studies in the Early History of Institutions. Vol. I–II. The theory of village communities. Cambridge, Mass.: University Press.
- —— (1880). Studies in the Early History of Institutions. Vol. III. The theory of village communities. Cambridge, Mass.: Charles W. Sever.
- —— (1880). Studies in the Early History of Institutions. Vol. IV. The theory of primitive democracy in the Alps. Cambridge, Mass.: University Press.
A paper read before the American Association for the Advancement of Science, August 27, 1880.
- Ross, Denman W. (1883). The Early History of Land-holding Among the Germans. Boston: Soule & Bugbee.
- ——— (1907). A Theory of Pure Design: Harmony, Balance, Rhythm. Boston: Houghton, Mifflin and Company.
- ——— (1912). On Drawing and Painting. Boston: Houghton Mifflin Company.
- Ross, Denman W. (1919). The Painter's Palette; A Theory of Tone Relations, an Instrument of Expression. Boston: Houghton Mifflin Company.
- —— (November 1923). Experiments in Drawing and Painting. The Century Association of New York.

== Gallery ==
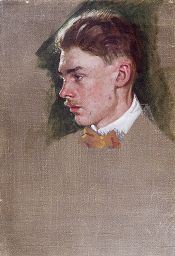
Portrait of Carl Peter Teigen

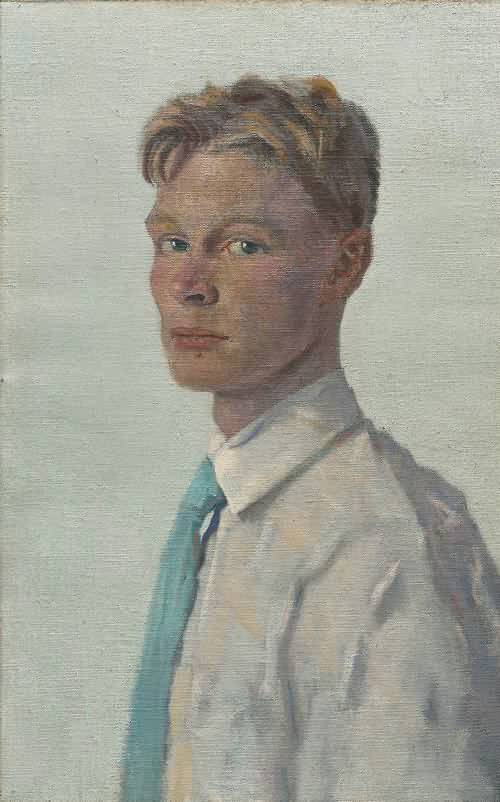
Portrait of a Youth

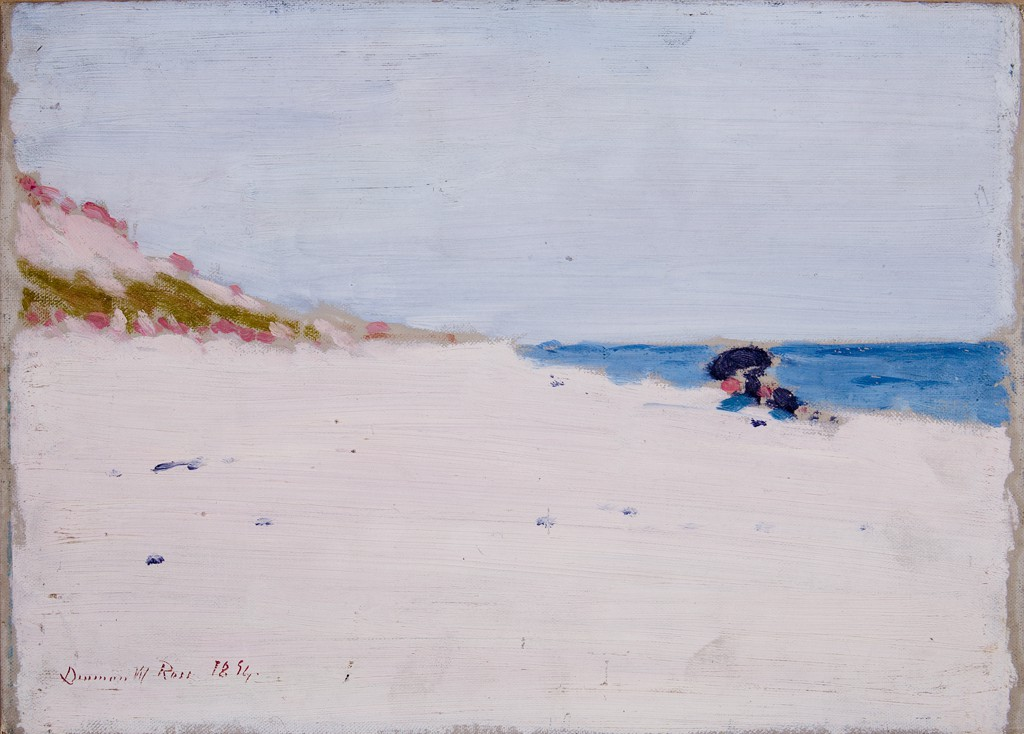
Highland Light, North Truro, 1894

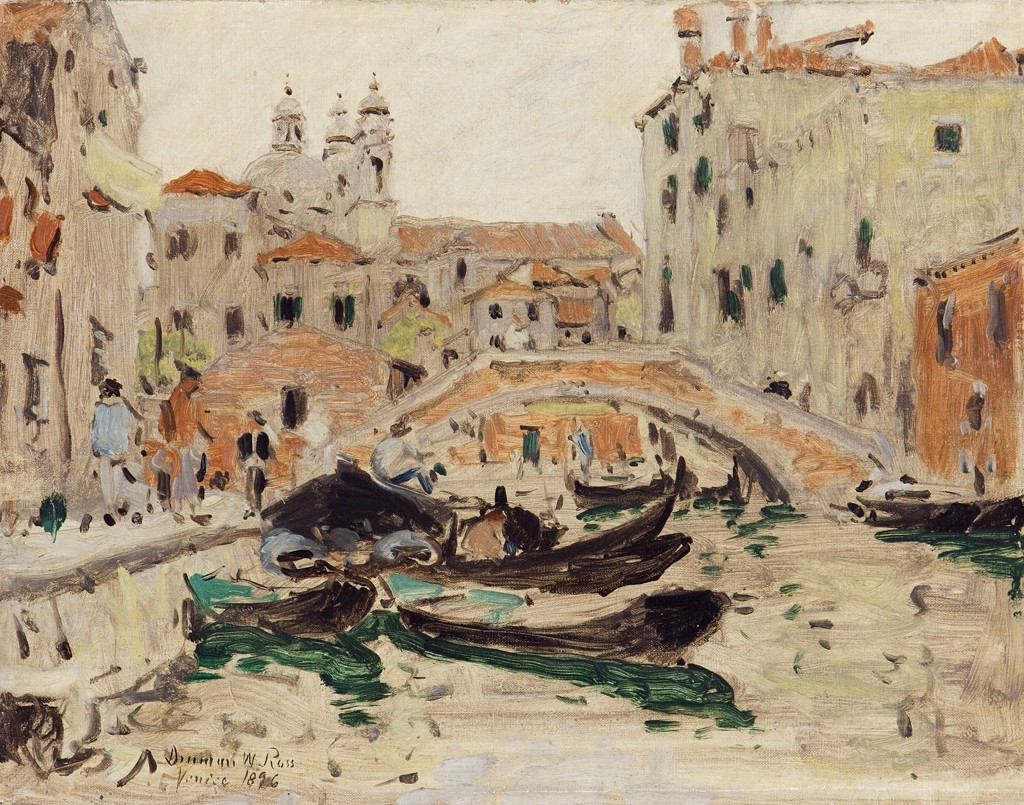
View of the Canal, Venice, 1896

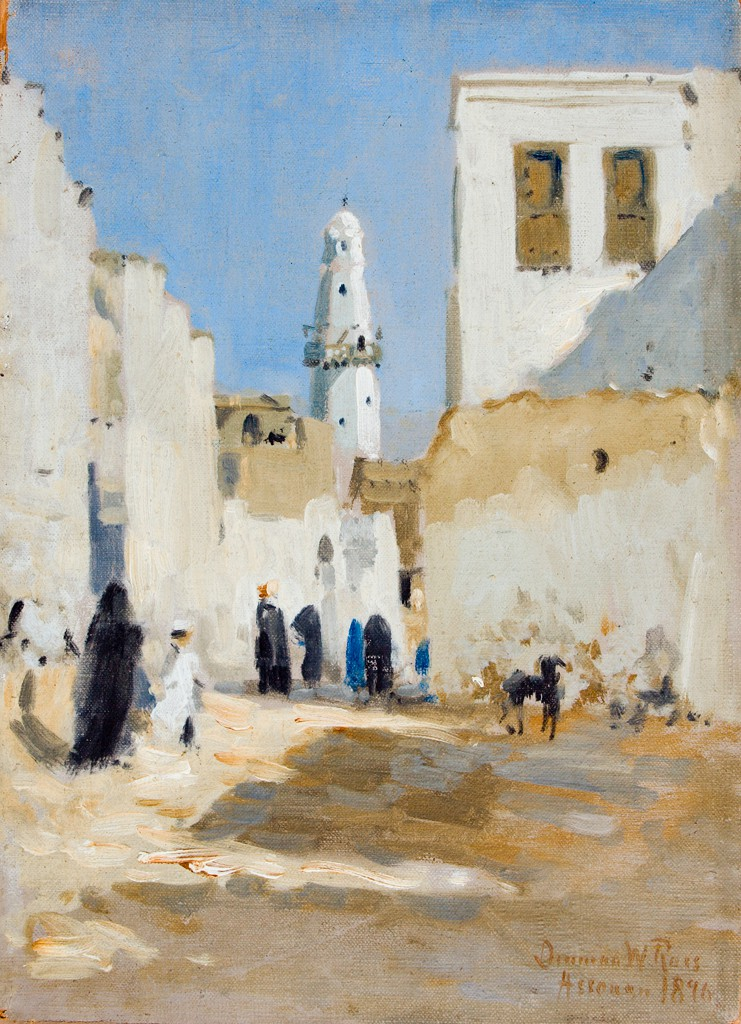
Assouan, Egypt, 1896

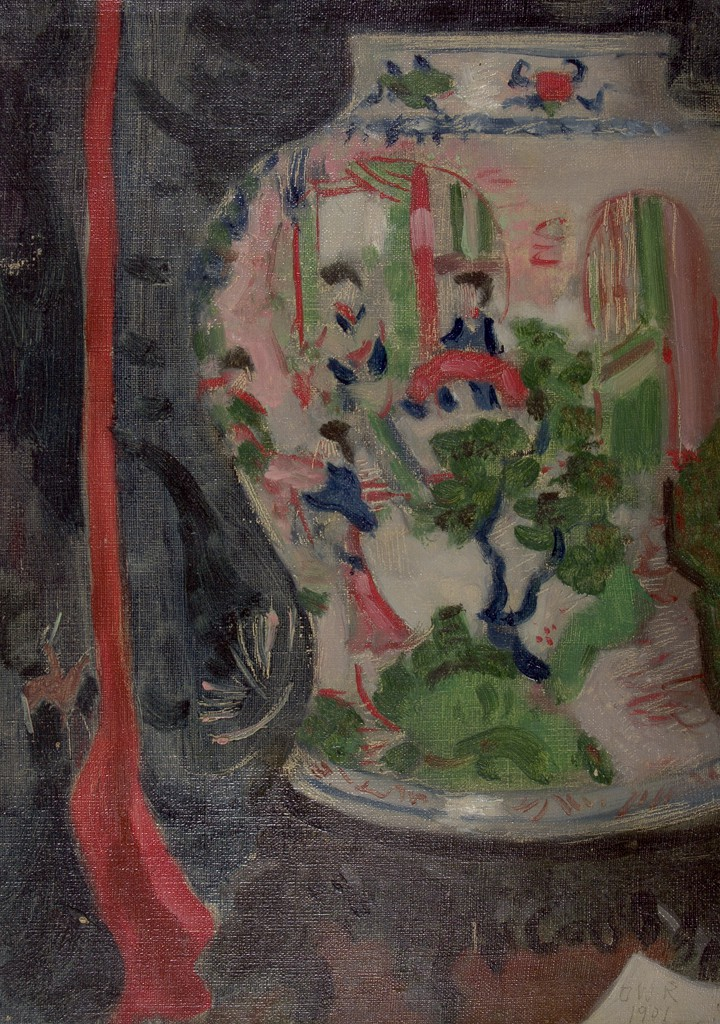
Still Life with Asian Vase and Red Ribbon, 1901

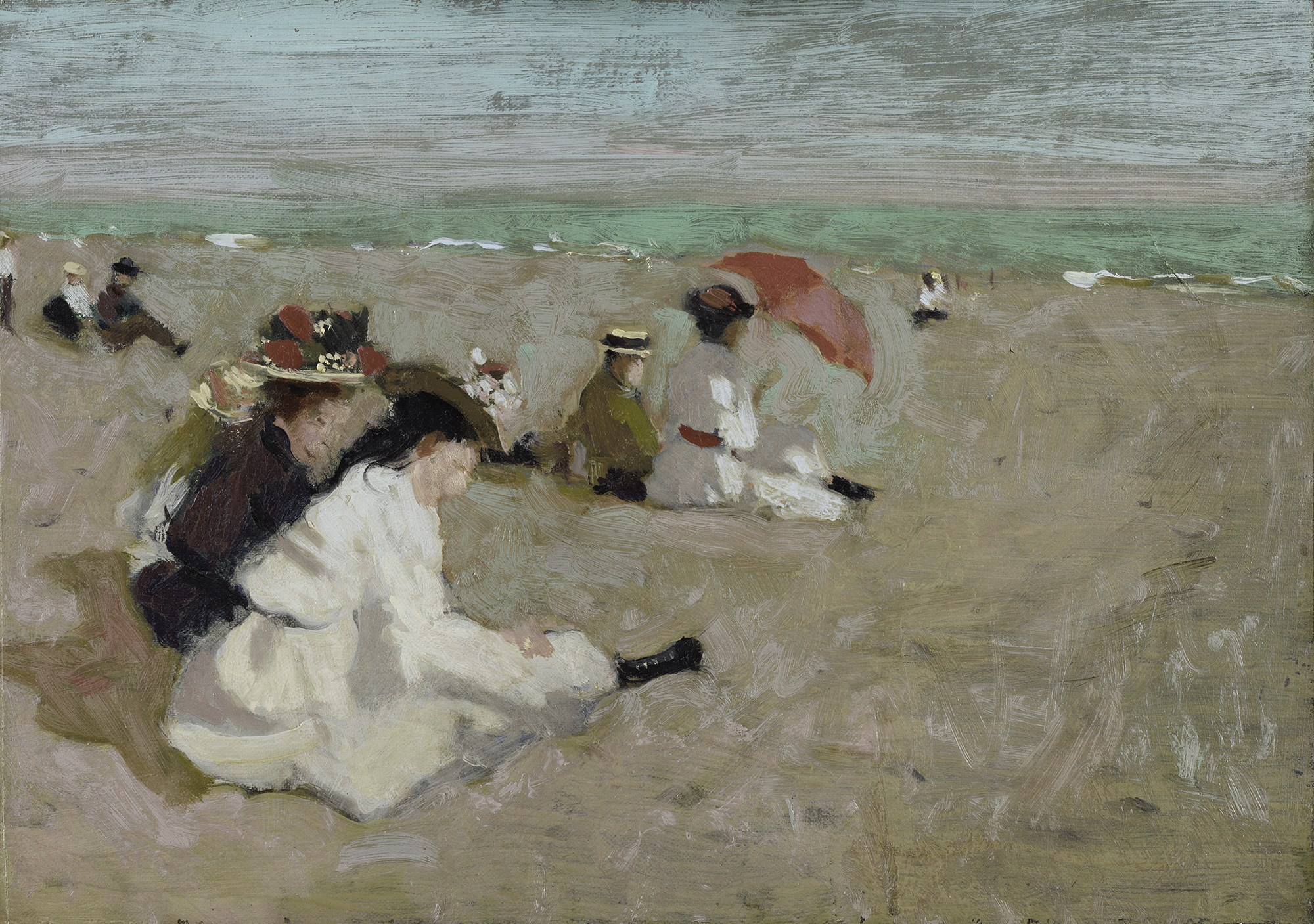
The Beach, 1908

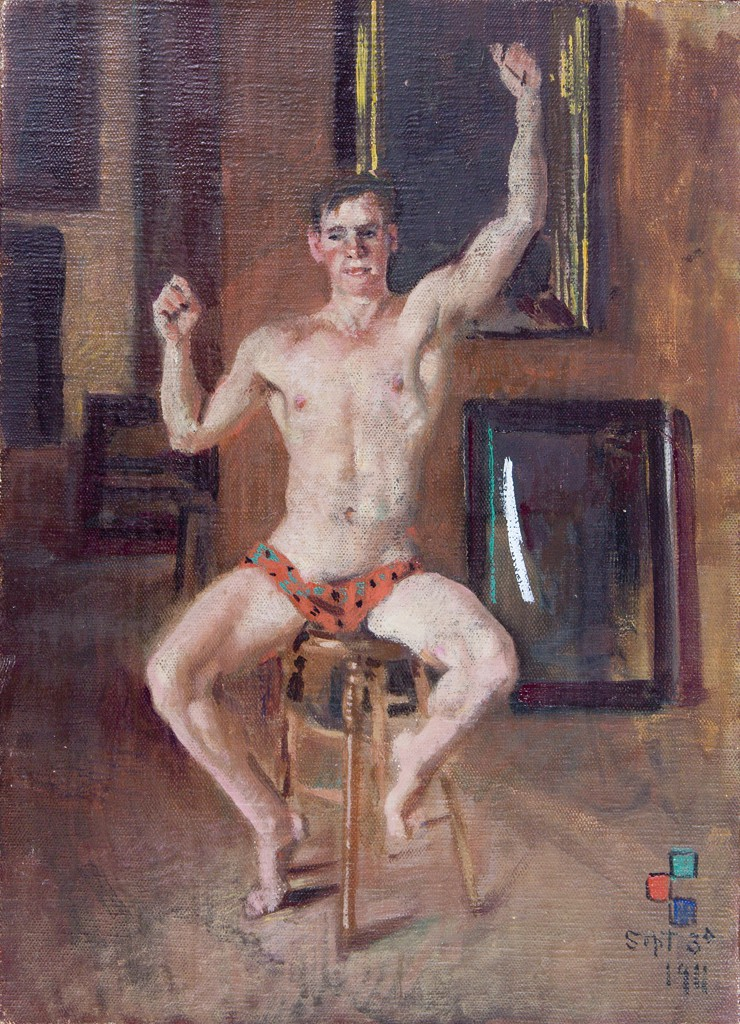
Portrait of a Seated Young Man, 1911

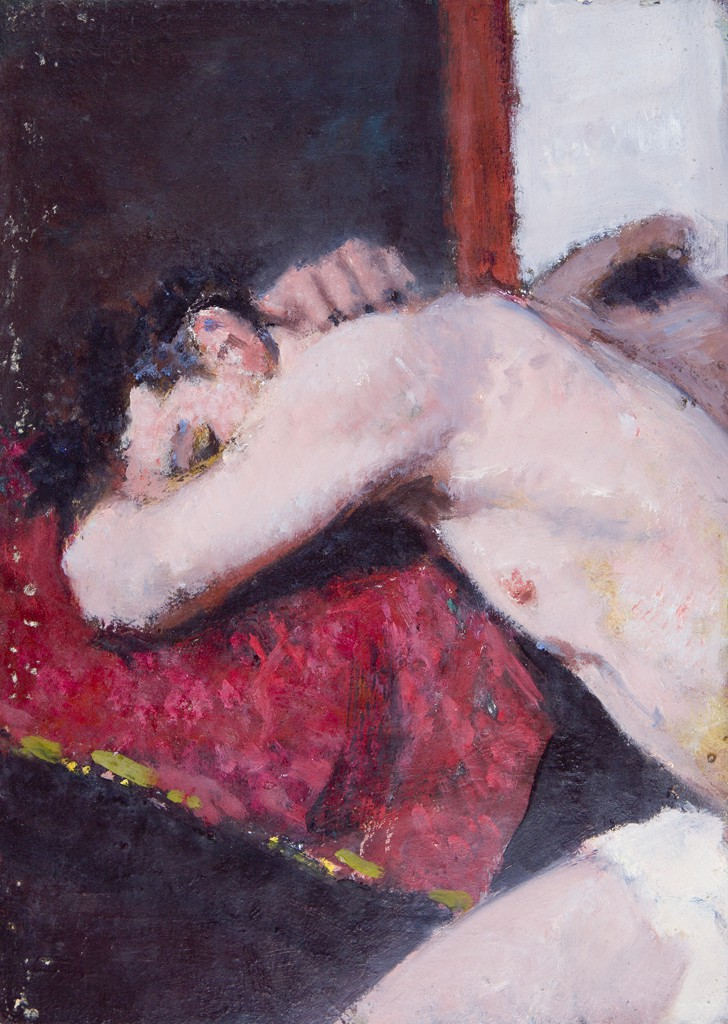
Portrait of David, 1922

== Sources ==
- Pratt, Patricia Ross (2020). The Best of Its Kind: The Life of Denman Waldo Ross: Teacher, Collector, Painter 1853–1935. Philadelphia: Northern Liberties Press. ISBN 978-1-933153-38-4.
