= Edmund C. Tarbell =

American painter (1862–1938)

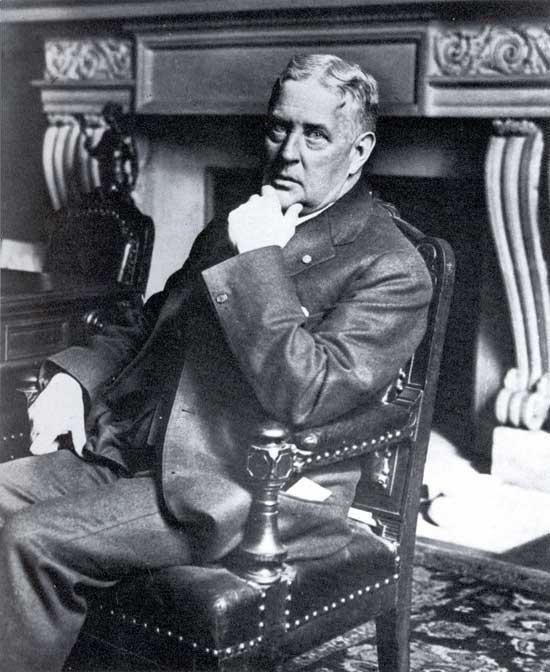
- Tarbell, c. 1919
- Born: April 26, 1862; Groton, Massachusetts, US
- Died: August 1, 1938 (aged 76); New Castle, New Hampshire, US
- Education: School of the Museum of Fine Arts, Boston
- Known for: Impressionism, Painting
- Movement: Ten American Painters

Edmund Charles Tarbell (April 26, 1862 – August 1, 1938) was an American Impressionist painter. A member of the Ten American Painters, his work hangs in the Boston Museum of Fine Arts, Metropolitan Museum of Art, National Gallery of Art, Smithsonian American Art Museum, Corcoran Gallery of Art, DeYoung Museum, National Academy Museum and School, New Britain Museum of American Art, Worcester Art Museum, and numerous other collections. He was a leading member of a group of painters which came to be known as the Boston School.

== Early life and education ==
Edmund C. Tarbell was born in the Asa Tarbell House, which stands beside the Squannacook River in West Groton, Massachusetts. His father, Edmund Whitney Tarbell, died in 1863 after contracting typhoid fever while serving in the Civil War. His mother, Mary Sophia (Fernald) Tarbell, remarried a shoemaking-machine manufacturer. Young "Ned" (as he was nicknamed) and his older sister, Nellie Sophia, were left to be raised by their paternal grandparents in Groton, a frontier town during the French and Indian Wars that the early Tarbell family helped settle.

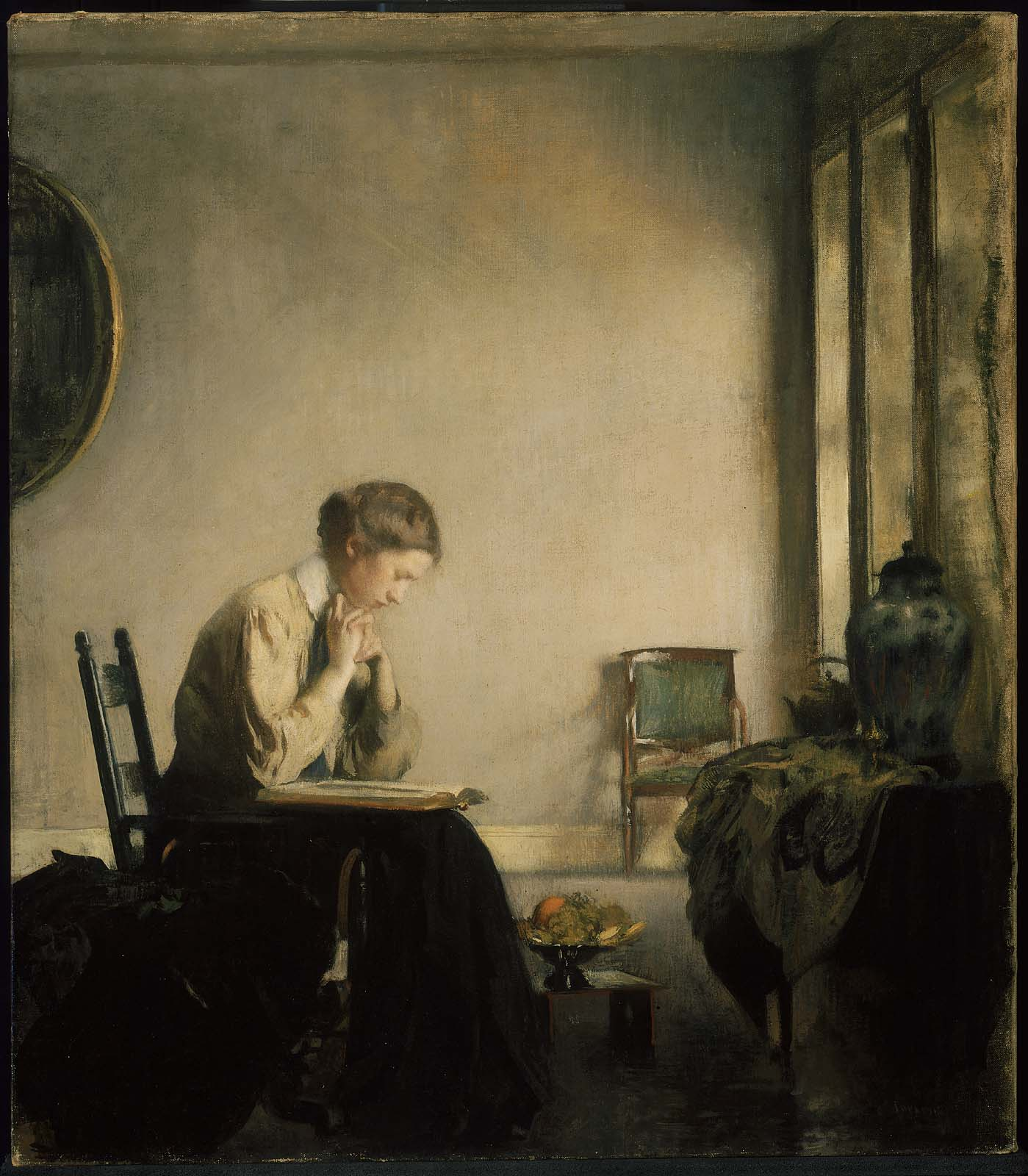
Girl Reading, 1909

As a youth, Tarbell took evening art lessons from George H. Bartlett at the Massachusetts Normal Art School. Between 1877 and 1880, he apprenticed at the Forbes Lithographic Company in Boston. In 1879, he entered the School of the Museum of Fine Arts, Boston, studying under Otto Grundmann. He matriculated in the same class with Robert Lewis Reid and Frank Weston Benson, two other future members of the Ten American Painters.

Tarbell was encouraged to continue his education in Paris, France, then center of the art world. Consequently, in 1883 he entered the Académie Julian to study under Gustave Boulanger and Jules Joseph Lefebvre. Paris exposed him to rigorous academic training, which invariably included copying Old Master paintings at the Louvre, but also to the Impressionist movement then sweeping the city's galleries. That duality would inform his work. In 1884, Tarbell's education included a Grand Tour to Italy, and the following year to Italy, Belgium, Germany and Brittany.

Tarbell returned to Boston in 1886, where he began his career as an illustrator, private art instructor and portrait painter.

== Marriage and family ==
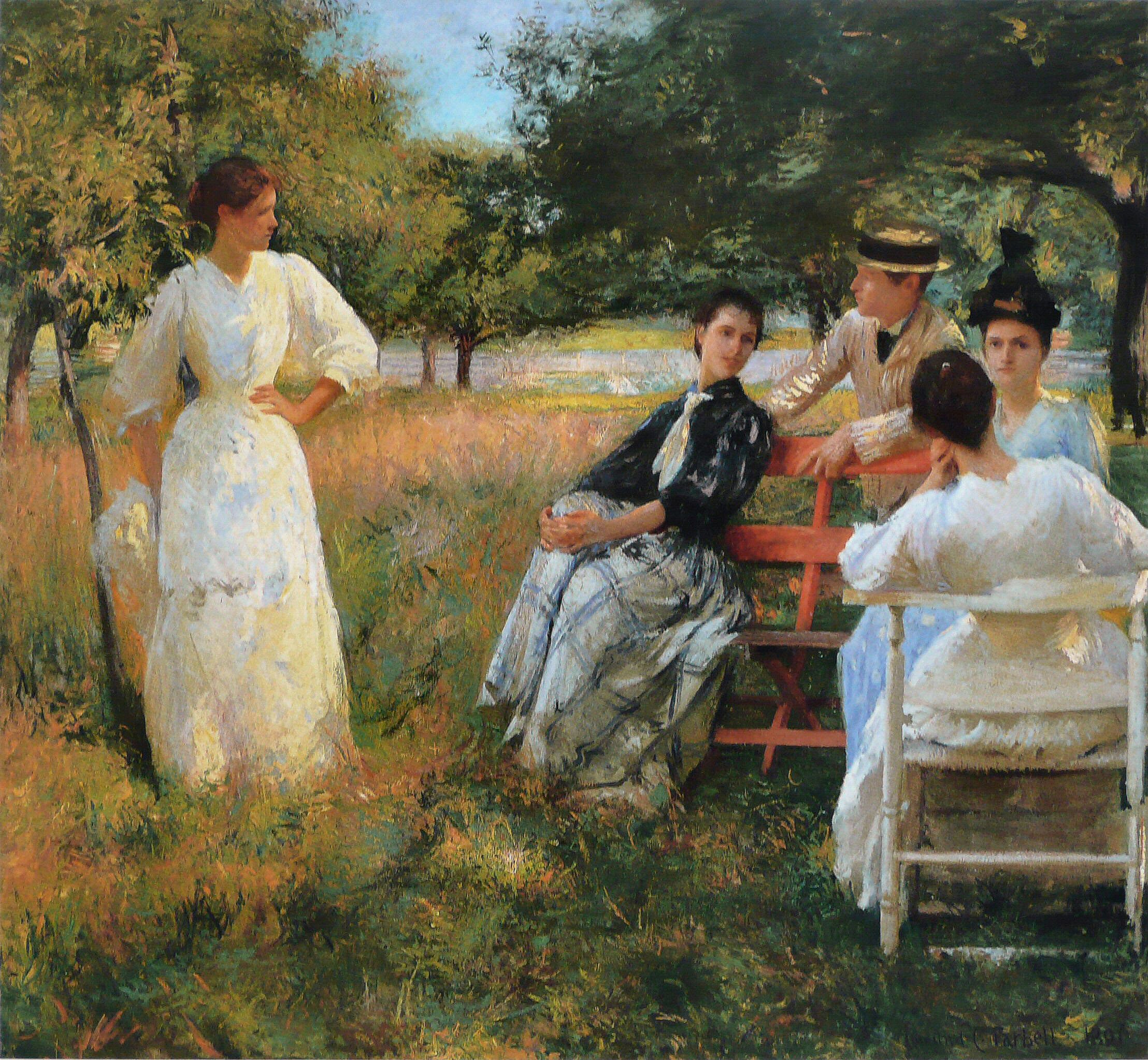
In the Orchard, 1891; Souther siblings, Mrs. Tarbell at far right

Two years after returning to Boston, Tarbell married Emeline Arnold Souther, an art student and daughter of a prominent Dorchester family. Preferring to work from posed models, Tarbell often painted those immediately at hand—his wife, four children (Josephine, Mercie, Mary and Edmund Arnold Tarbell), and grandchildren. The paintings illustrate their lives.

While teaching at the Museum School in Boston, Tarbell and his family lived from 1886 until 1906 in the Ashmont section of Dorchester, the house belonging to his stepfather, David Frank Hartford. Then they lived on Commonwealth Avenue in Boston at the Hotel Somerset, located beside The Fens and not far from his atelier in the Fenway Studios on Ipswich Street.

In 1905, they bought as a summer residence a Greek Revival house in New Castle, New Hampshire, an island on the Atlantic coast. Tarbell built his studio perched on the bank of the Piscataqua River, ambling there each morning along gardens of peonies, iris and hollyhocks. Through his north-facing wall of glass he could sketch sailboats as they tacked the busy shipping channel between Portsmouth and the ocean. He was an early and avid proponent of the Colonial Revival movement, collecting American antiques (back when most were considered used furniture) and arranging them with Chinese ceramics, Japanese prints and other objets d'art as studio props. Tarbell also collected salvaged architectural elements; his studio's facade featured a Federal fanlight doorway. In the new living room added to the main house, he installed a Georgian mantelpiece attributed to Ebenezer Dearing (1730–1791), a master Portsmouth ship woodcarver. The Tarbells eventually would retire to New Castle.

== Career ==
In 1889, Tarbell assumed the position of his former mentor, Otto Grundmann, at the Museum School, where he was a popular teacher. He gave pupils a solid academic art training: before they learned to paint, they had to render from plaster casts of classical statues. His students included Bertha Coolidge, Margaret Fitzhugh Browne, Marie Danforth Page, F. Luis Mora, Marguerite Stuber Pearson, and Lilian Westcott Hale. So pervasive was his influence on Boston painting that his followers were dubbed "The Tarbellites."

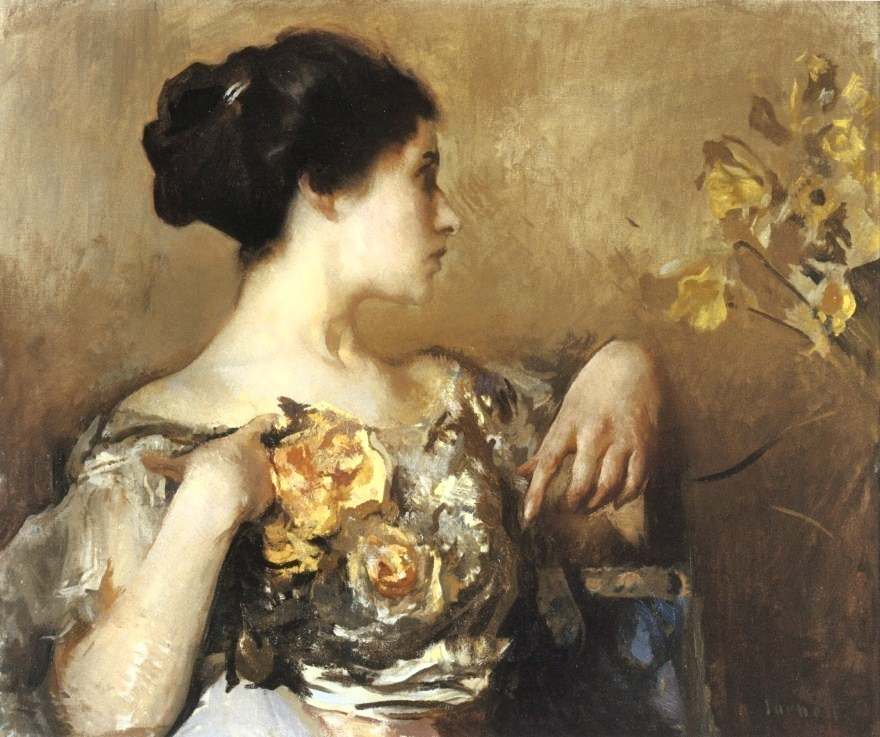
Lady with a Corsage, 1911

But in 1912, the Museum of Fine Arts hired Huger Elliott from the Rhode Island School of Design as Supervisor of Educational Work, charged with reorganizing the Museum School, which until then managed its own affairs. An upheaval ensued. He lectured Tarbell how to teach, then how to paint. Tarbell was incensed, making it no secret that he considered Elliott artistically inept. In December, Tarbell resigned together with Frank W. Benson, his friend and fellow instructor. The men in 1913 discussed founding a society to encourage art and artists in the city. With financial backing from Lilla Cabot Perry, painter and affluent Brahmin, The Guild of Boston Artists opened in 1914. Tarbell was its first president, serving through 1924.

In 1918, Tarbell was hired as principal of the art school at the Corcoran Gallery of Art in Washington, D.C., a position he held until 1926. But the Museum of Fine Arts wanted him back at the Museum School, appointing him in 1925 as Chairman of the Advisory Council. For two years he promoted and oversaw construction of the school's new building designed by Guy Lowell. In 1930, however, the school asked Augustus John to recommend English artists as instructors. Tarbell and Benson, advocates of indigenous talent, would again resign.

=== Works ===
His 1891 plein air painting entitled In the Orchard established his reputation as an artist. It depicts his wife with her siblings at leisure. Tarbell became famous for impressionistic, richly hued images of figures in landscapes. His later work shows the influence of Johannes Vermeer, the 17th-century Dutch painter. In such works, Tarbell typically portrays figures in genteel Colonial Revival interiors; these studies of light and tone are executed with restrained brushwork and color.

Tarbell painted portraits of many notable individuals, including industrialist Henry Clay Frick, Yale University President Timothy Dwight V, and U.S. presidents Woodrow Wilson, Calvin Coolidge, and Herbert Hoover. His work was also part of the painting event in the art competition at the 1932 Summer Olympics.

== Honors and legacy ==
- Tarbell won many art prizes and medals, an honorary doctorate from Dartmouth College in 1929, and served as juror of painting at the 1904 Louisiana Purchase Exposition, the 1915 Panama–Pacific International Exposition, and the 1926 Sesquicentennial Exposition.
- He was elected a full member of the National Academy of Design in 1906, and a fellow of the American Academy of Arts and Sciences in 1927.
- Tarbell's funeral service was held in Boston at King's Chapel, his obituary reading: "Great American Painter Dies," The Boston Traveler, August 3, 1938;

Edmund Tarbell contributed to America's place in the world of art. To him and his work Europe turned its eyes in admiration, as did the whole people in America. Tarbell's works were honest works. In him was none of the transient sensationalism which brought notoriety to others. Tarbell canvases will be speaking to the world centuries from now. His character was as true as his art.

== Sampling of paintings ==
- 1890 – Three Sisters
- 1890 – Woman in White
- 1891 – A Girl Sewing in an Orchard
- 1891 – In the Orchard
- 1892 – Girl with Horse
- 1892–3 – The Bath
- 1893 – Mother and Child in Pine Woods
- 1893 – A Summer Idyll
- 1893 – An Amethyst
- 1894 – Arrangement in Pink and Gray
  - Awarded the 1894 First Hallgarten Prize by the National Academy
- 1896 – Girl's Head and Shoulders
- 1897 – Girl in Pink and Green
- 1898 – Blue Veil
- 1899 – My Family at Cotuit
- 1899 – Across the Room
- 1900 – A Sketch
- 1902 – Schooling the Horses
- 1904 – Girl Crocheting
- 1904 – By the River (Riverbank)
- 1904 – Summer Breeze
- 1905 – A Girl Mending
- 1906 – Arthur Hunnewell
- 1906–7 – Girls Reading
- 1907 – Preparing for the Matinee
- 1907 – New England Interior
- 1907 – Josephine and Mercie
- 1909 – Girl Reading
- 1909 – Piscataqua River
- 1910 – A Girl Mending
- 1910 – Henry Clay Frick and Helen Clay Frick
- 1911 – My Children in the Woods
- 1911 – Woman with Corsage
- 1912 – Mercie Cutting Flowers
- 1912 – Dreamer
- 1913 – Reverie
- 1914 – Young Girl Studying
- 1914 – My Family
- 1916 – Nell and Elinor
- 1919 – Mary and the Venus
- 1922 – Mother and Mary
- 1926 – Peonies and Iris
- 1928 – Marjorie and Little Edmund

== Gallery ==
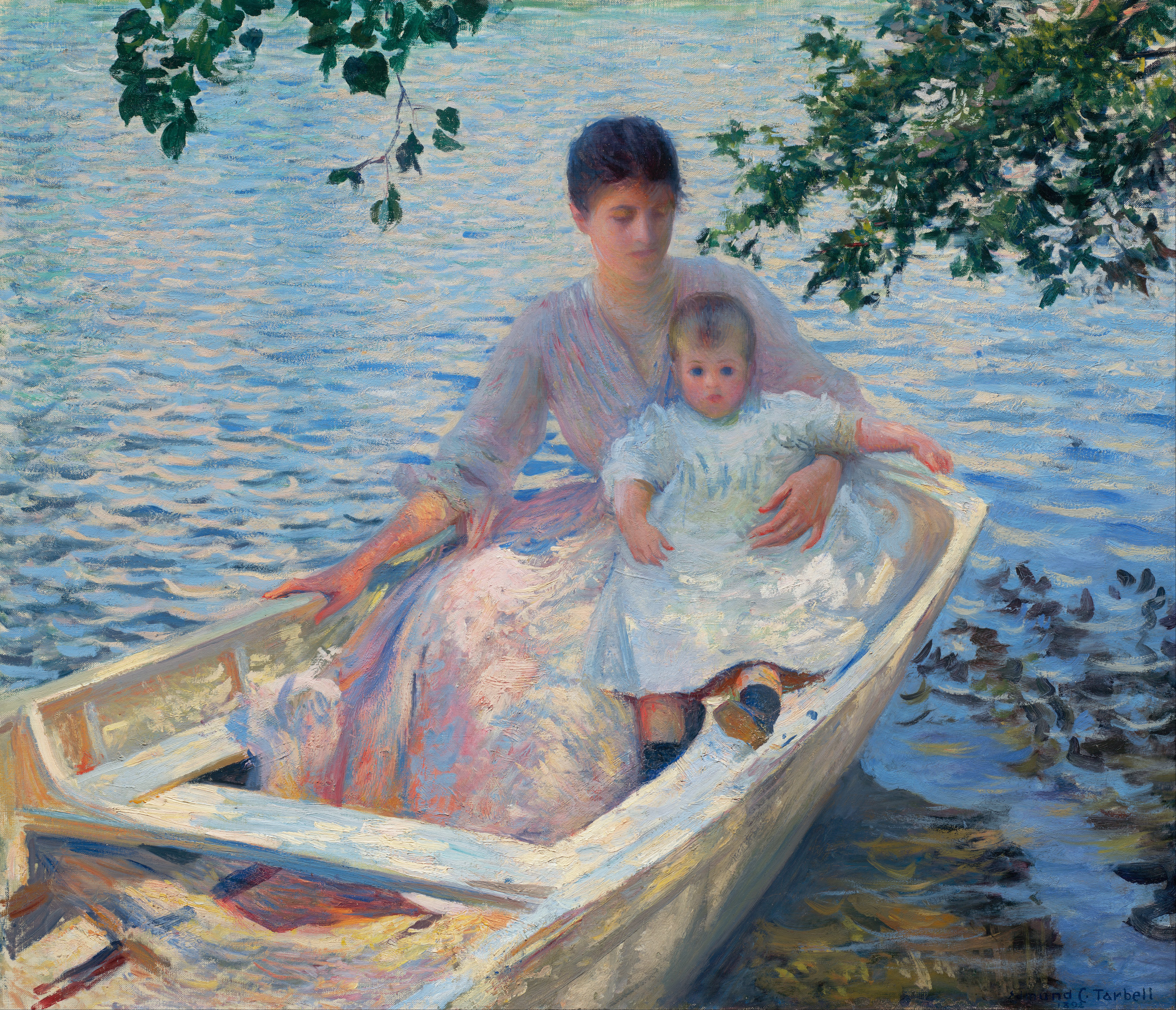
Mother and Child in a Boat, 1892; Emeline with Josephine

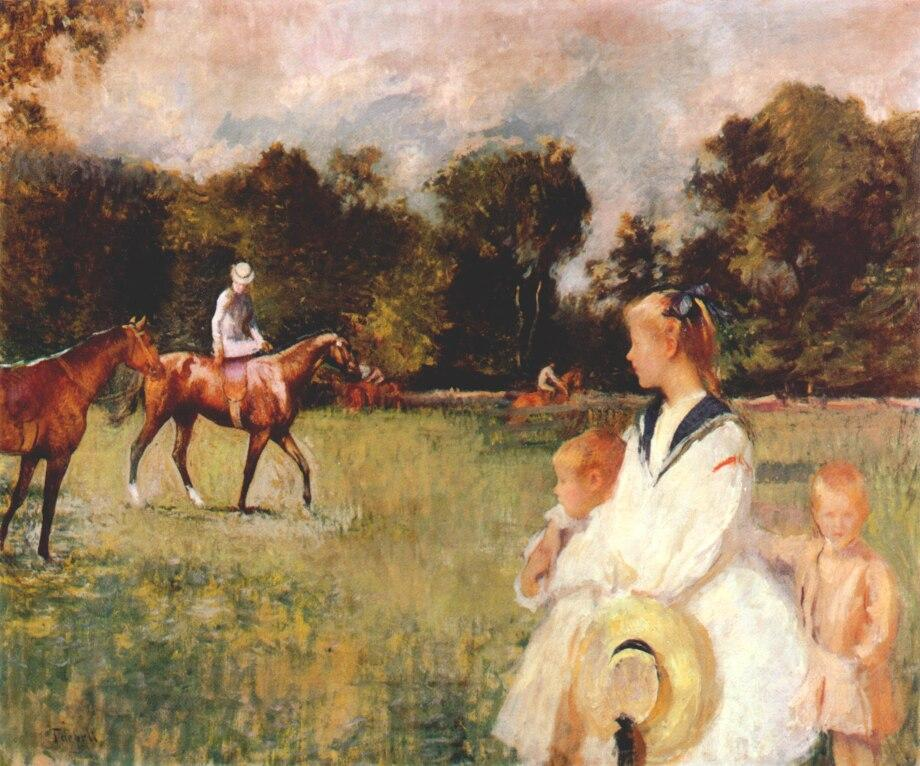
Schooling the Horses, 1902; Josephine and Edmund (twice)

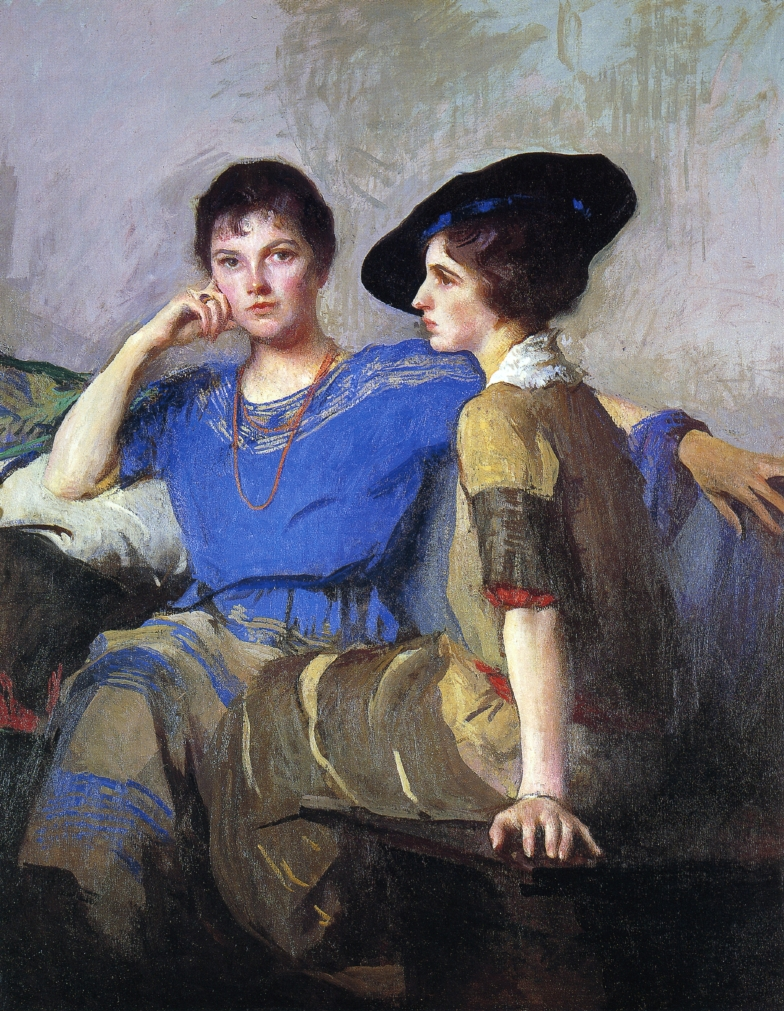
The Sisters, 1921; Josephine and Mary, now veteran posers

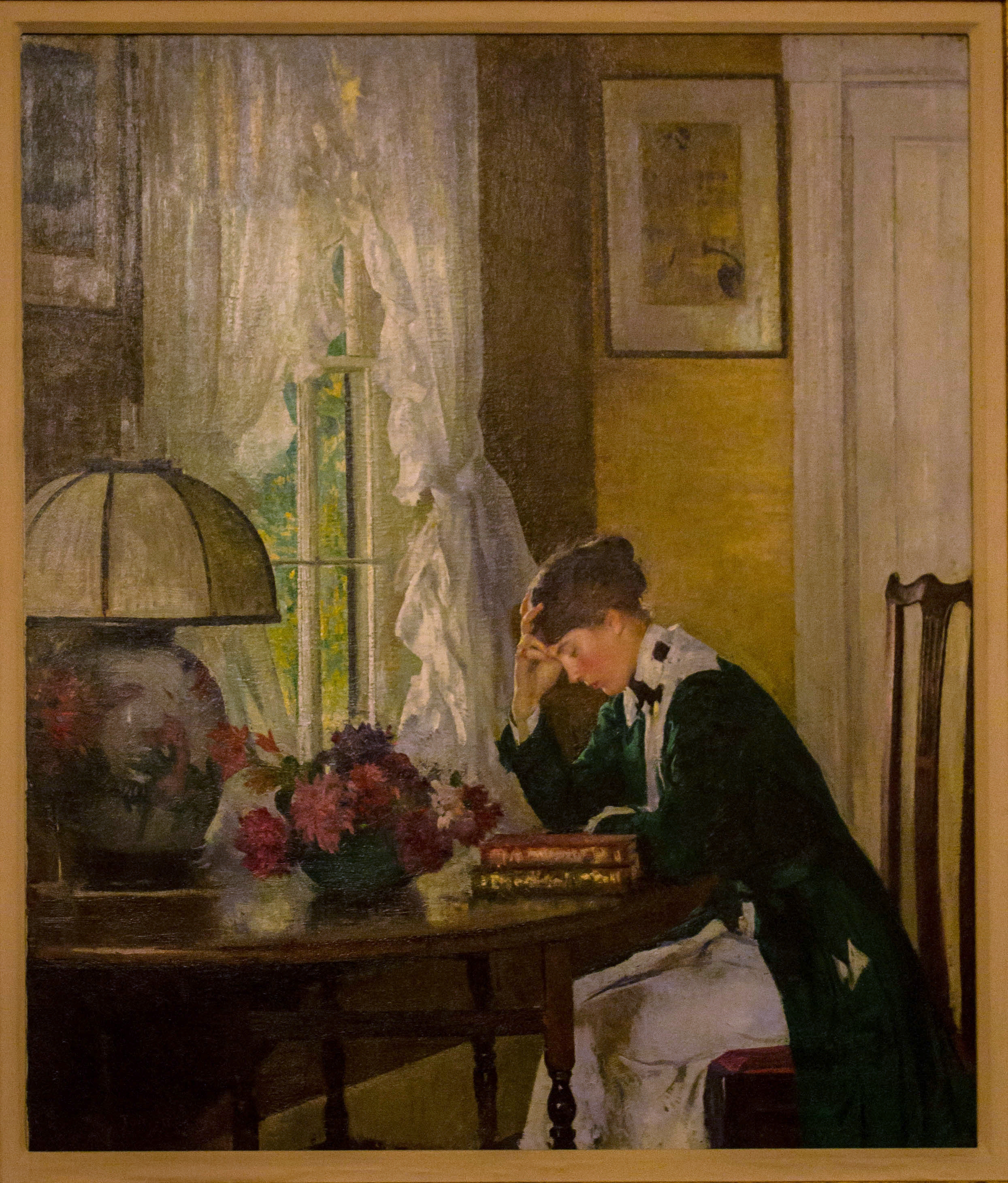
The Letter; Josephine at the family's island summer home

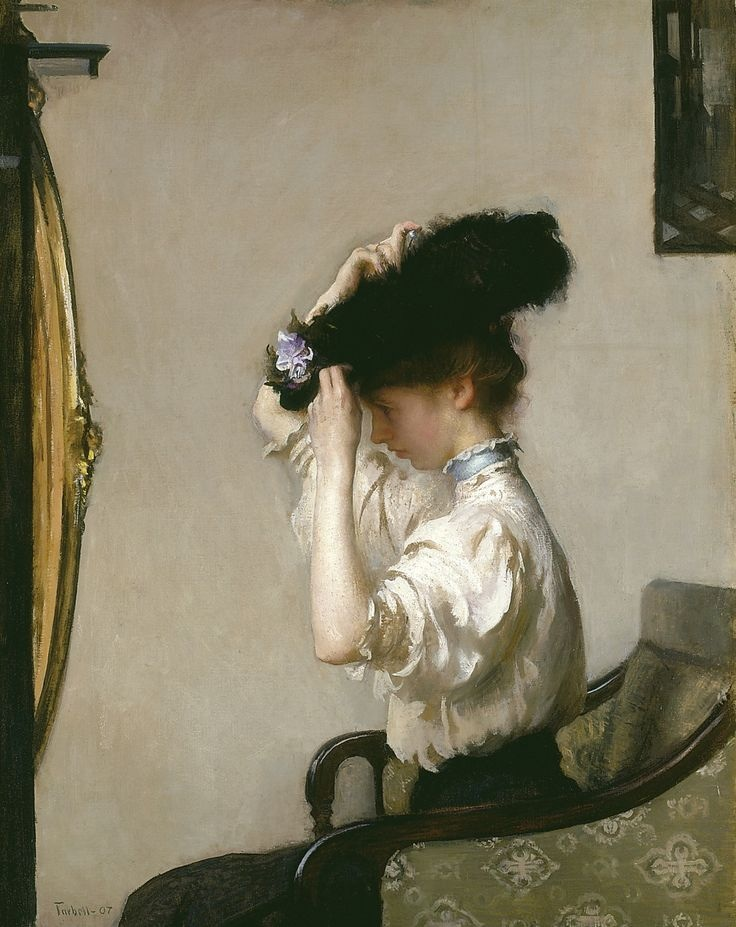
Preparing for the Matinee, 1907

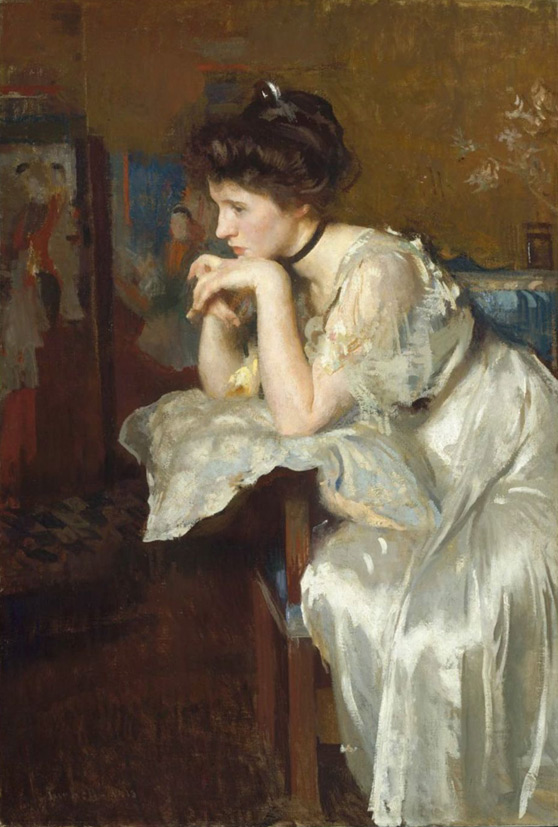
Reverie, 1913
