= Steuber =

Steuber is a surname of German origin, derived from the word stouben meaning "to whip up dust", a metonymic indication to the occupation of miller. Notable people with the surname include:

- Bob Steuber (1921–1996), American football halfback
- Tiffany Steuber (born 1977), Canadian curler

== See also ==
- Stueber/Stuber/Stüber, a surname of different origin, meaning "stube keeper"
