= Bertha Coolidge =

American painter (1880–1953)

- Born: 1880; Lynn, Massachusetts, U.S.
- Died: 1953 (aged 72–73)
- Education: School of the Museum of Fine Arts, Boston
- Occupation: Painter
- Style: Portrait miniature
- Spouse: Marshall Perry Slade (m. 1933)

Bertha Coolidge (1880–1953) was an American painter of portrait miniatures.

== Biography ==
Born in Lynn, Massachusetts, Coolidge studied at the School of the Museum of Fine Arts, Boston under Edmund Charles Tarbell and Frank Weston Benson before traveling to France, where in 1904 she had lessons with one Bourgois, of whom nothing further is known. She also studied in Munich, in 1907, likely with the artist Hermann Grüber. In 1913 she held a solo exhibition at the Copley Gallery in Boston; in 1914 several of her works were accepted for the Paris Salon. Other venues at which she showed work include the National Academy of Design, the Art Institute of Chicago, and the Panama–Pacific International Exposition. In 1916 her painting The Green Coat, currently in the collection of the Metropolitan Museum of Art, won the Dr. Bolling Lee Prize from the Art Association of Newport. Coolidge was a member of numerous artistic societies in the United States and France. Late in the 1910s she moved to New York City from Boston, and in 1930 began a new career as a bibliographer. She joined the women book collectors' club Hroswitha Club in 1944, and her collection of Maria Edgeworth was donated to Beinecke Library at Yale University. In 1933 she married Marshall Perry Slade, who manufactured woolen products.
