= Marie Danforth Page =

American painter (1869–1940)

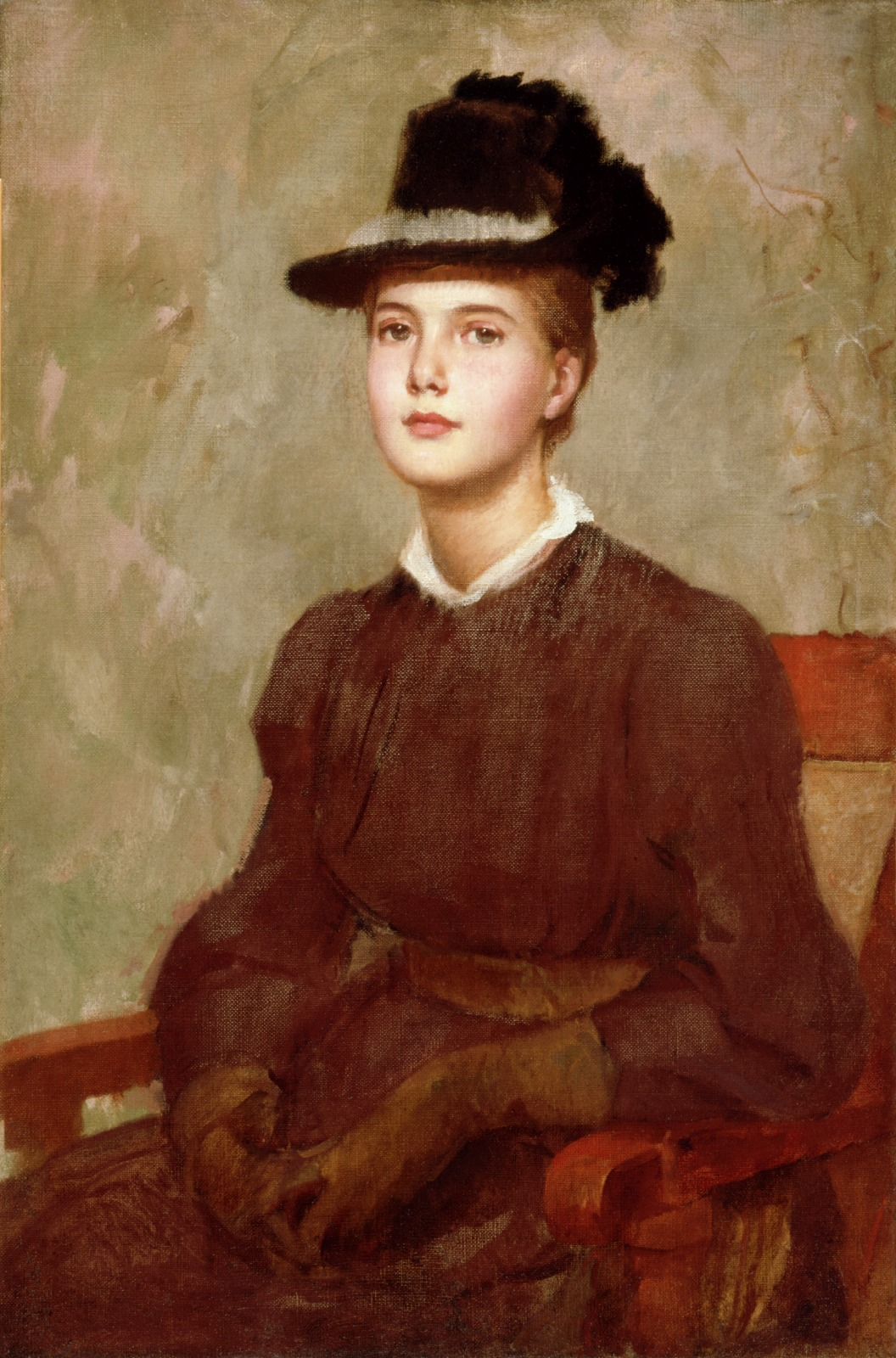
Portrait of Marie Danforth Page, Frank Duveneck, oil on canvas, c. 1889. In the collection of the Cincinnati Art Museum

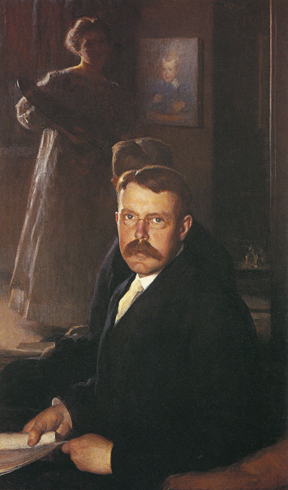
Calvin Gates Page, Marie Danforth Page, oil on canvas, 1909. Privately owned.

Marie Danforth Page (1869–1940) was an American painter, mainly of portraits.

A native of Boston, Page began drawing lessons with Helen M. Knowlton at 17. These continued until 1889, when she began five years of lessons at the School of the Museum of Fine Arts, Boston, under the tutelage of Frank Weston Benson and Edmund Charles Tarbell. In 1903 she traveled to Europe, where she copied paintings of Diego Velázquez while in Spain; on her return she took lessons at Harvard University in color theory with Denman Ross. She also studied informally with Abbott Handerson Thayer at some point. In 1896 she married Dr. Calvin G. Page, a research bacteriologist, and settled with him at 128 Marlborough Street in Boston, where she had a studio on the top floor. The couple would adopt two daughters, Susan and Margaret, in 1919.

Page soon began to receive commissions at home; some of these were simply for copies of works by people like Gilbert Stuart, but others were for original portraits. Three of her paintings were accepted for the Panama-Pacific Exhibition of 1915 in San Francisco, and one won a bronze medal. Further prizes followed, at the National Academy of Design – to which she was elected as an associate in 1927 – and the Newport Art Association, and her first one-woman show came in 1921 at the Guild of Boston Artists. She continued to win prizes, including an honorary MA from Tufts University, and show work until her death.

Page insisted throughout her career that sitters visit her in her studio instead of going to visit them; by the 1920s she was charging a respectable $1000 for a full-length portrait. Among figures whom she painted were Mary Emma Woolley, the president of Mount Holyoke College; the Boston Symphony Orchestra, in rehearsal under Serge Koussevitsky; and six professors at Harvard, where her husband taught at the medical school from 1911 until 1925. She also designed a poster, Building for Health, to be published during World War I. Her technique was bold and virile, and some contemporaries criticized it as too "masculine".

Page's papers are currently held by the Archives of American Art. One of her portraits, a c. 1911 painting of a boy titled Portrait of Henry, was included in the inaugural exhibition of the National Museum of Women in the Arts, American Women Artists 1830–1930, in 1987.
