= Photo-Era =

Defunct American photography magazine

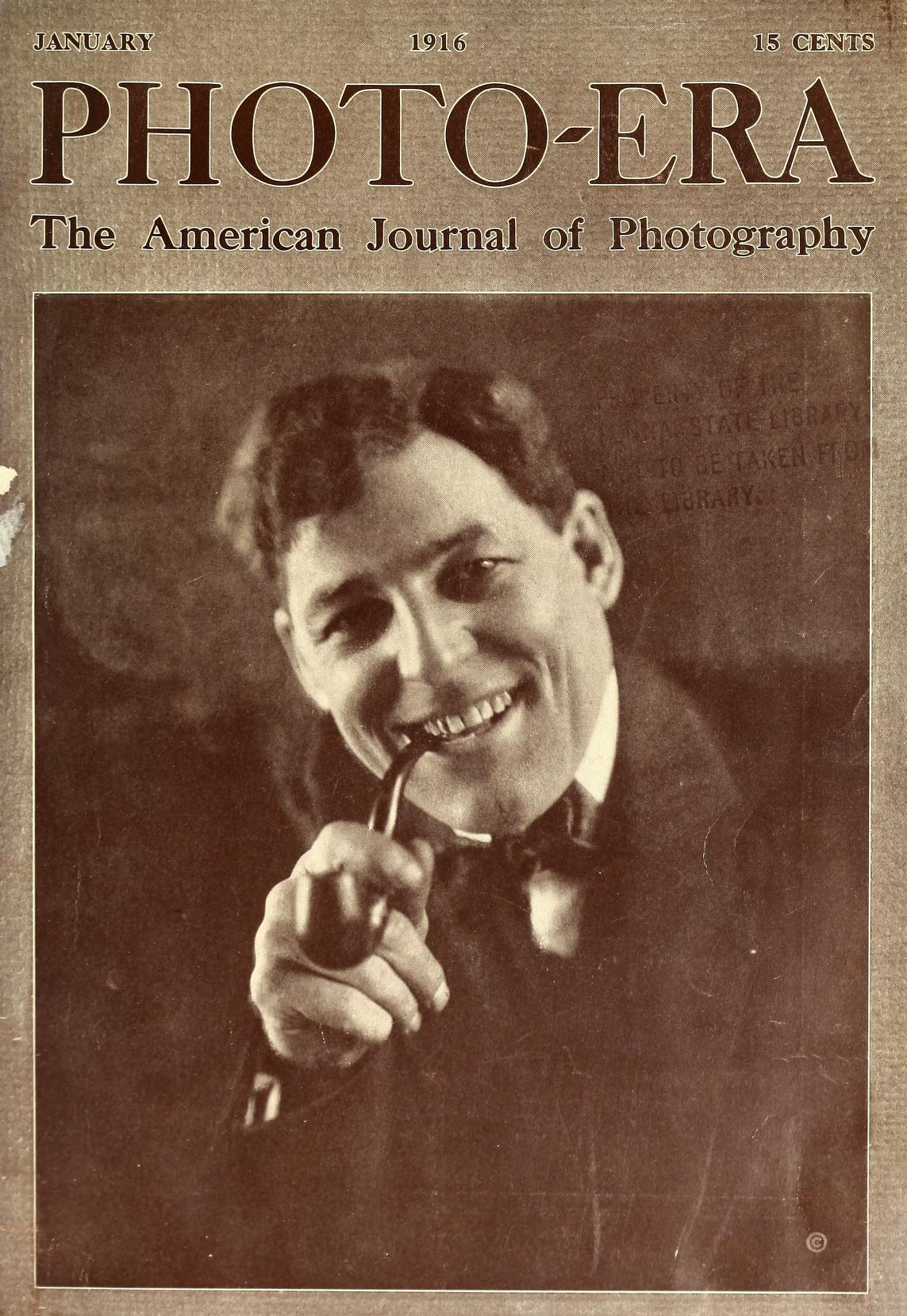
Photo-Era cover, January 1916

Photo-Era: The American Journal of Photography was an American magazine for amateur photographers published in Boston from 1898 to 1932.

== Publishers ==
Published by Photo Era Co. 185 Franklin Street, Boston, at its launch in May 1898, the magazine was sold for 15c a copy or $1.50 annual subscription. It advertised itself as "The New Illustrated Monthly of Progress in the Science and Art of Photography. An up-to-date publication for Amateurs and Professionals" with illustrations in color, photogravure and heliotype. The magazine headquarters moved later to Wolfeboro, New Hampshire.

== Contents ==
The target audience was mainly the dedicated amateur for whom the magazine published such articles as "How Design Comes Into Photography", by Harvard lecturer Denman W. Ross in December 1899, and "Water Front Scenes" by William S. Davies, Bruce Keith's "A Home Made Adjustable Daylight Enlarger", and "Photography in the Tropics", written by H. C. Cornthwaite in its September 1915 number, with instructions for successful photography in the opposite conditions in the snow in February 1900 alongside an interview with the first man to be photographed in the United States, nonagenarian Dr. Charles E West. The magazine included regular sections including the results of its Beginner and Advanced competitions; 'The Crucible', which detailed photographic formulae; 'On the Groundglass', discussing individual images and series; and 'News Events'.

== Editors ==
In 1906 Wilfred A. French (1855–1928), formerly of photographic supply firm Benjamin French & Co. purchased the magazine and became managing editor, later selling it but remaining associate editor. A. H. Beardsley was president of Photo Era Publishing Company and editor until the cessation of publication in 1931. Phil M. Riley was associate editor from 1904 to 1912, and C. B. Neblette was associate editor from 1927. Capt. R. H. Ranger, inventor of the photoradiogram wireless photo transmitter-receiver, was also briefly associate editor. Other editors were Juan C. Abel who was Manager from inception, and Thomas Harrison Cummings. J. W. Barber, Joseph Prince Loud, Henry Lewis Johnson, and George Jepson constituted an Advisory Board from the date of establishment.

== Contributors ==
Among prominent contributors were Sadakichi Hartmann, often writing under the name Sidney Allan; and New Jersey professor of art Warren R. Laity.
