= Museo Etnografico Tiranese =

Ethnographic museum in Tirano, Lombardy, Italy

Coordinates: 46°13′05″N 10°09′17″E

Museo Etnografico Tiranese (MET)
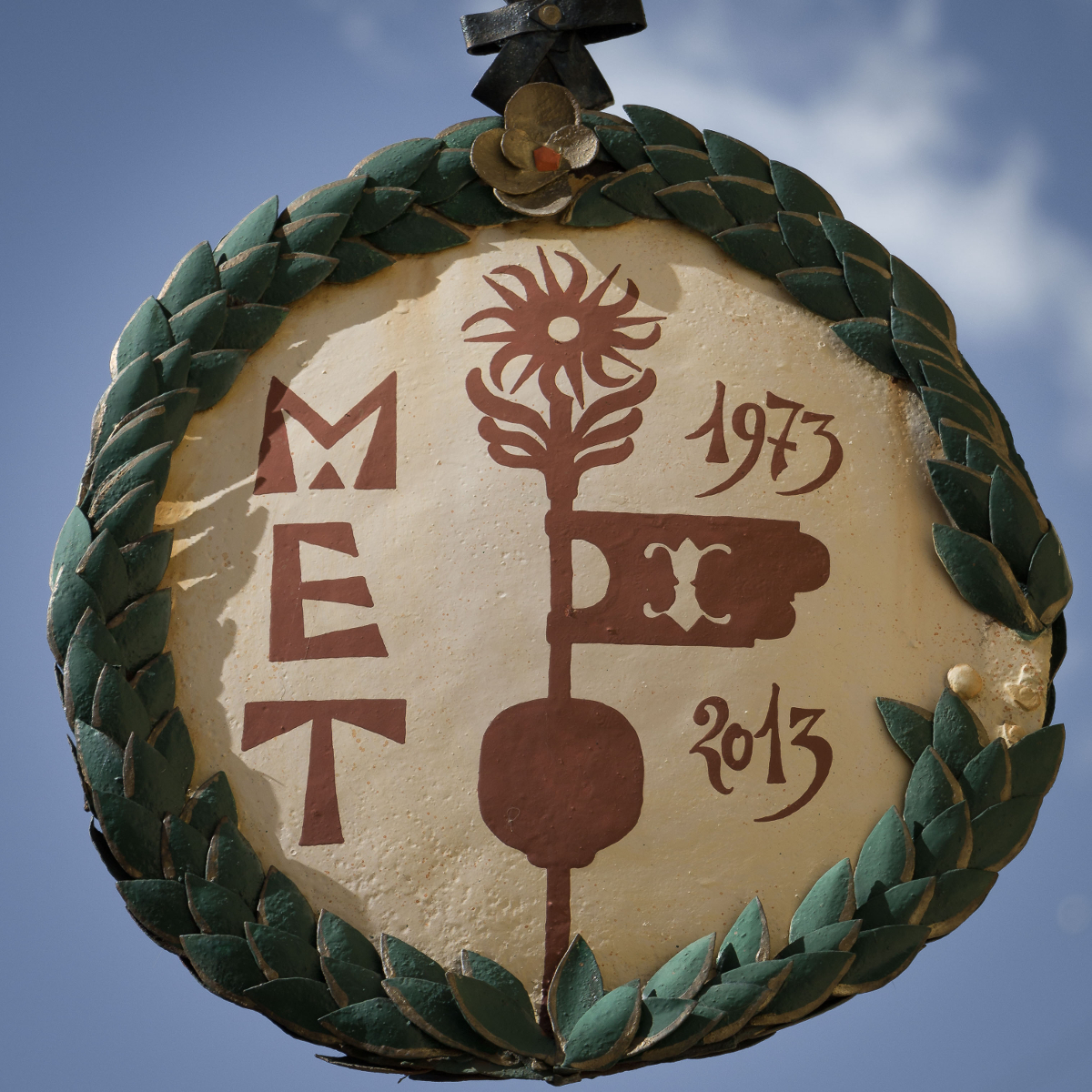
- Established: 1973
- Location: Piazza Basilica, 30, 23037 Madonna di Tirano., Tirano, Italy
- Owner: Municipality of Tirano (since 2018)
- Website: www.museotirano.it

The Museo Etnografico Tiranese (MET) is an ethnographic museum in Tirano, a town in the valley of Valtellina in the Lombardy region (province of Sondrio). It was founded in 1973 thanks to the "Centro Iniziativa Giovanile (C.I.G.)" with the aim to document peasant life and culture of the mountain region of the Valtellina. The "Centro Iniziativa Giovanile" run the museum until the end of the year 2017, since then the municipality of Tirano took responsibility for the continuation and development of the museum.

== Museum collection ==
The collection of the Museo Etnografico Tiranese is located since 1990 in the Casa del Penitenziere (Penitent's House), an 18th-century Palazzo nearby the Basilica Madonna di Tirano. Until then it was housed in the ground floor of the Palazzo San Michele, located as well at the square of the basilica. The collection was moved to its new location as a result of the Valtellina flood disaster of the summer of 1987. The municipality of Tirano renewed and adapted therefore the complete building. On a historical point of view the location at the Piazza della Basilica is a very strategical one because in the year of 1514 the town of Tirano was allowed to host on the Piazza an annual trade-fair which became quite important during the reign of the Three Leagues in Valtellina. This way the square of the basilica became notable for both, the religious element of the pilgrimage and the economic element of the trade-fair. Furthermore, a painting from the local painter Antonio Caimi sketches a typical but idealized day at this fair-trade in the middle of the 19th century.

The central interests of the museum-collection are objects and devices that reflect the historical peasant life in the Valtellina. Until now the Museo Etnografico Tiranese has collected more than 14.000 objects, of which a big part is exposed in the exhibition halls of the museum. The exhibition area is extended over three floor levels and a cellar room, showing a cross-section of the historic working and rural living environment of the Valtellina. On the ground level the workshop of a cartwright and cooper is arranged with traditional equipment for wood- and ironwork which were used for the construction and repair of carts and barrels. In the first floor the production of traditional textile, mainly based on natural fibres such as linen and hemp, is displayed. Next to a traditional hand loom even instruments of producing woollen fibres, such as reels, spindles and carding-machines are exposed. Another room on the first floor is referring to the nearby Sanctuary of Madonna di Tirano, the dominant religious element of the city since the beginning of the 16th century. Notable here are the vestments donated to the Basilica in 1636 by Cardinal Duke Richelieu, French clergymen and statesman at the same time. The donation is to consider as a political act with the aim to strengthen the followers of the French party in the Valtellina during the conflicts of the Bündner Wirren, part of the larger Thirty Years War. On the second floor of the museum a "stüa", a room-type in the alpine range typical for its wood-panelled ceiling and walls, has been organized as a living- and bedroom. Another room gives place to the reconstruction of the basic features of a local kitchen. Major section on this floor is the show-room with tools of the daily use of peasant activity. The items are grouped to different topics such as the cheese dairy, the slaughtering, the forest work or the work in the terraced vineyards of the Valtellina. The cellar houses in particular two historic wine presses made of wood. The big one was typical after the period of the use of the big lever supported press and before the use of the more stable and more compact iron screw-press. The small wine press was used to squeeze the grapes for the Sforzato ("sfurzat"), a raisin wine traditionally produced in the Valtellina.

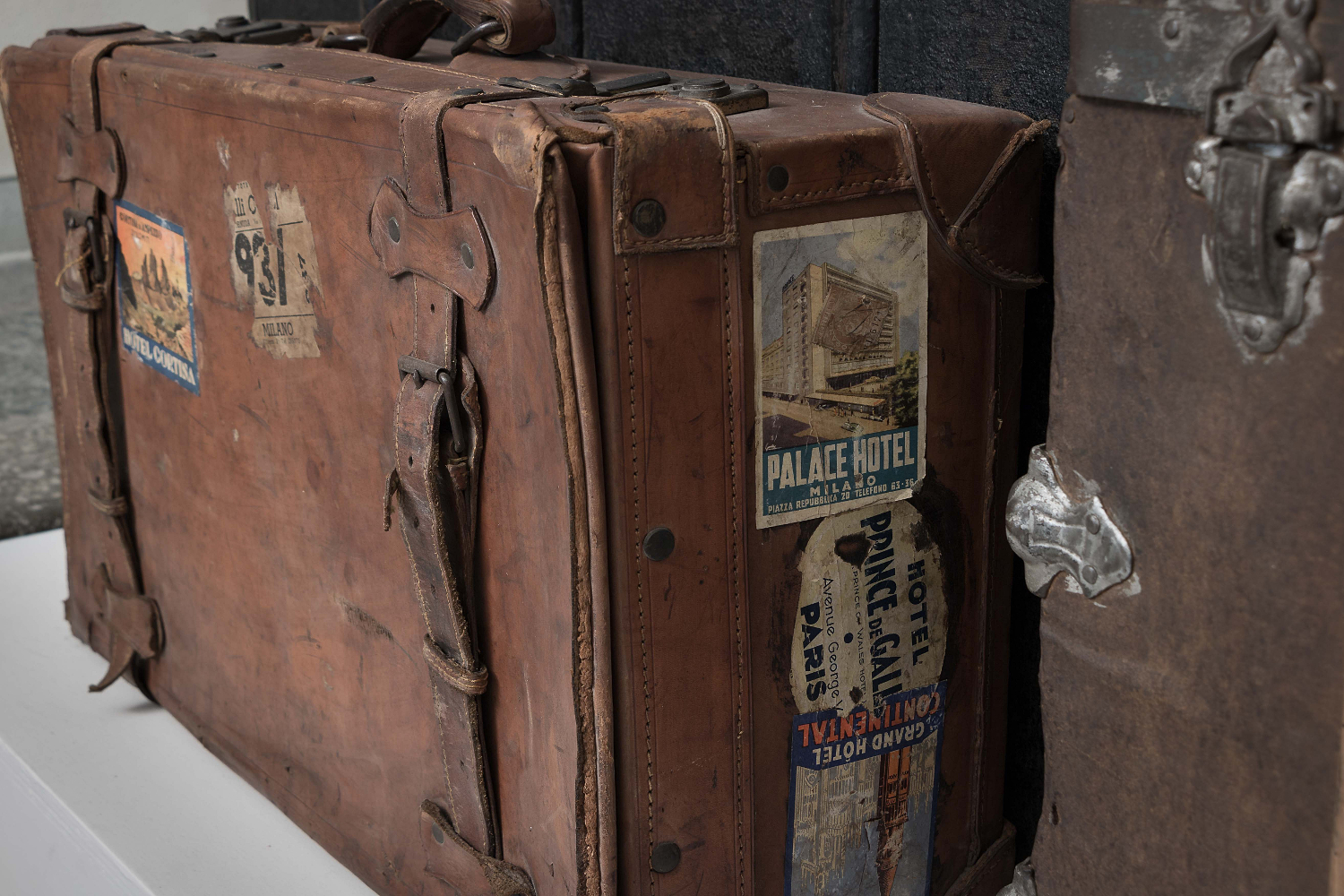
Luggage of emigrants

In the year of 1993 the Museo Etnografico Tiranese has also been associated with the Centro Provinciale di documentazione sull'emigrazione, which was founded to study the Italian migration movement with a focus on the emigration from the province of Sondrio. Several books have been published to this topic, especially on the issue of emigrants in Australia. Therefore, the collections of the museum contain more than 1.600 letters from Australia in originals and in copy which describe the new life of the emigrants, and generally are a source for communication structures between the new and the old home land.

In addition to the exhibition-collection, there is also a photo- and postcard-collection, a tape-library, a film-library, a print-collection and an archive of historical documents. The collection of historical photos and postcards now contains more than 4.000 objects and provides, together with a collection of historical prints, outstanding material for studies of the changing in the cultural landscape and settlement of the Valtellina.

== Gallery ==
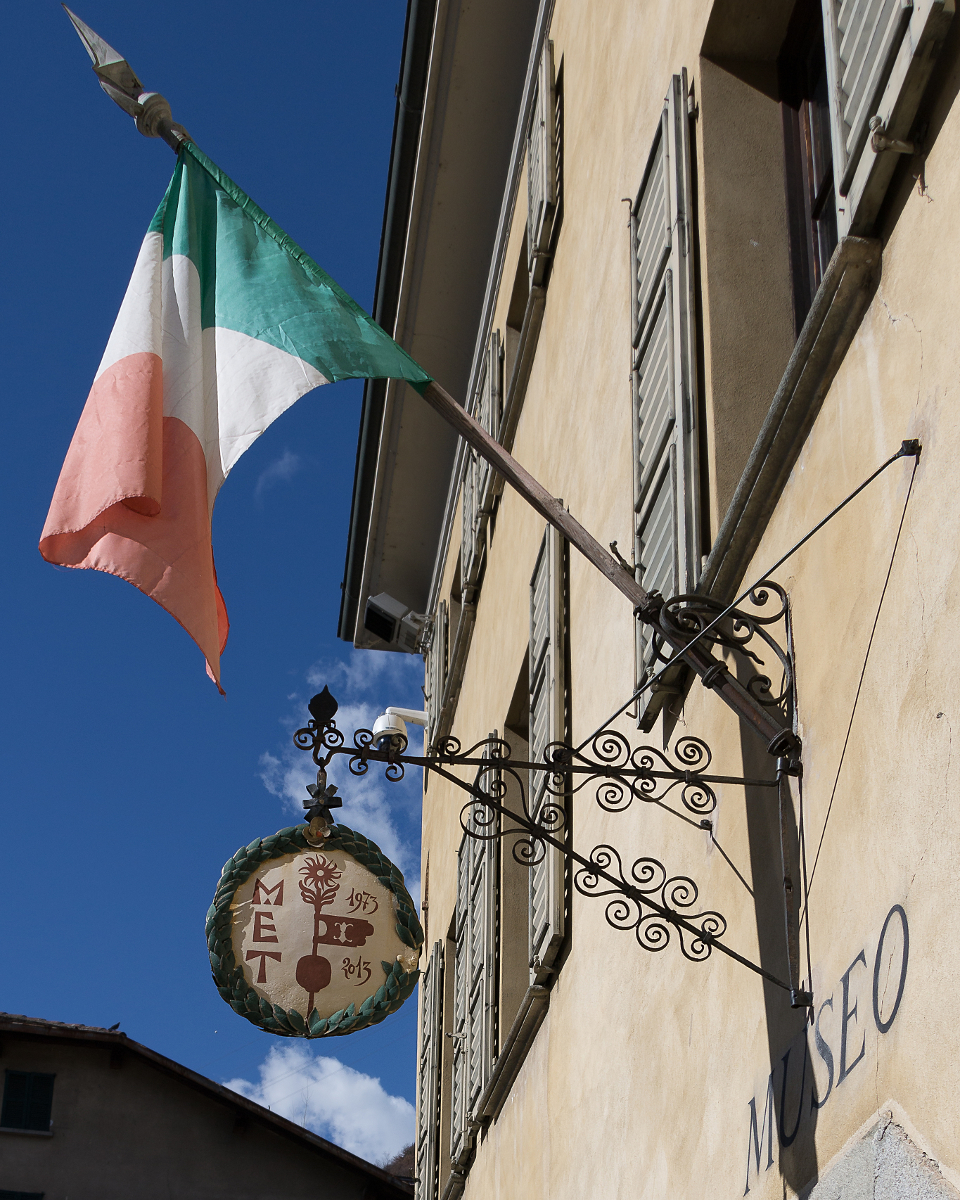
Entrance

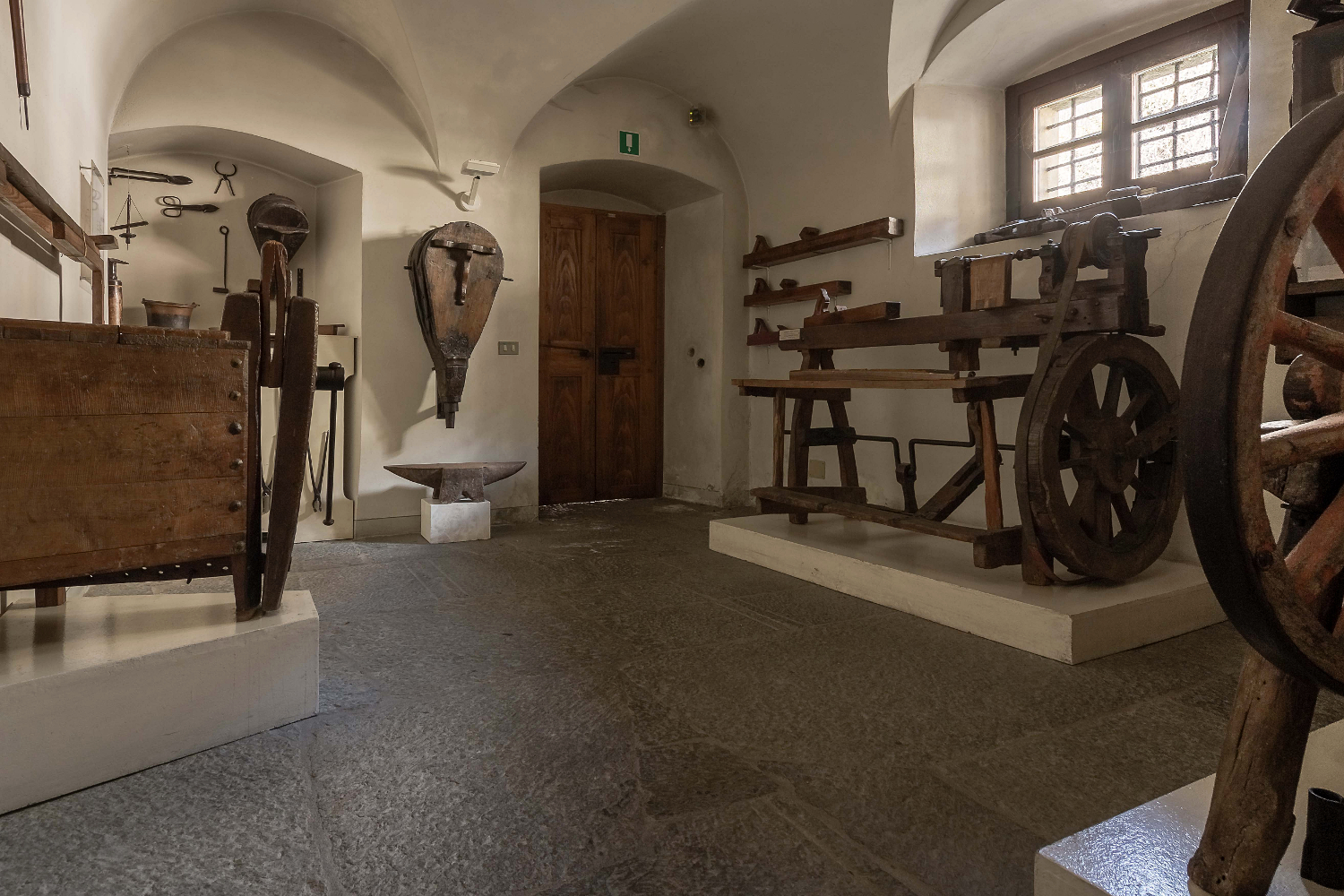
Workshop of a cartwright

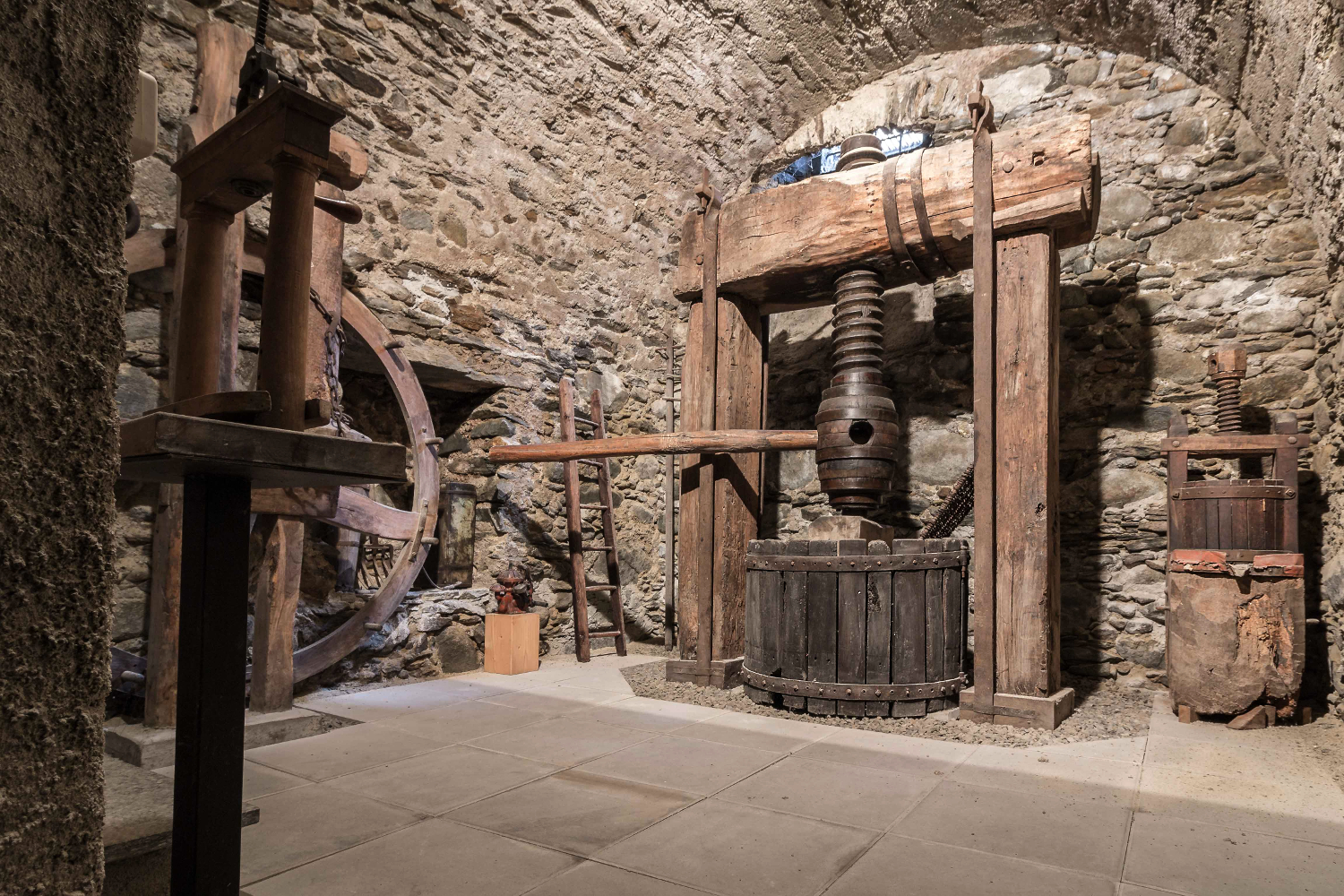
Wine press

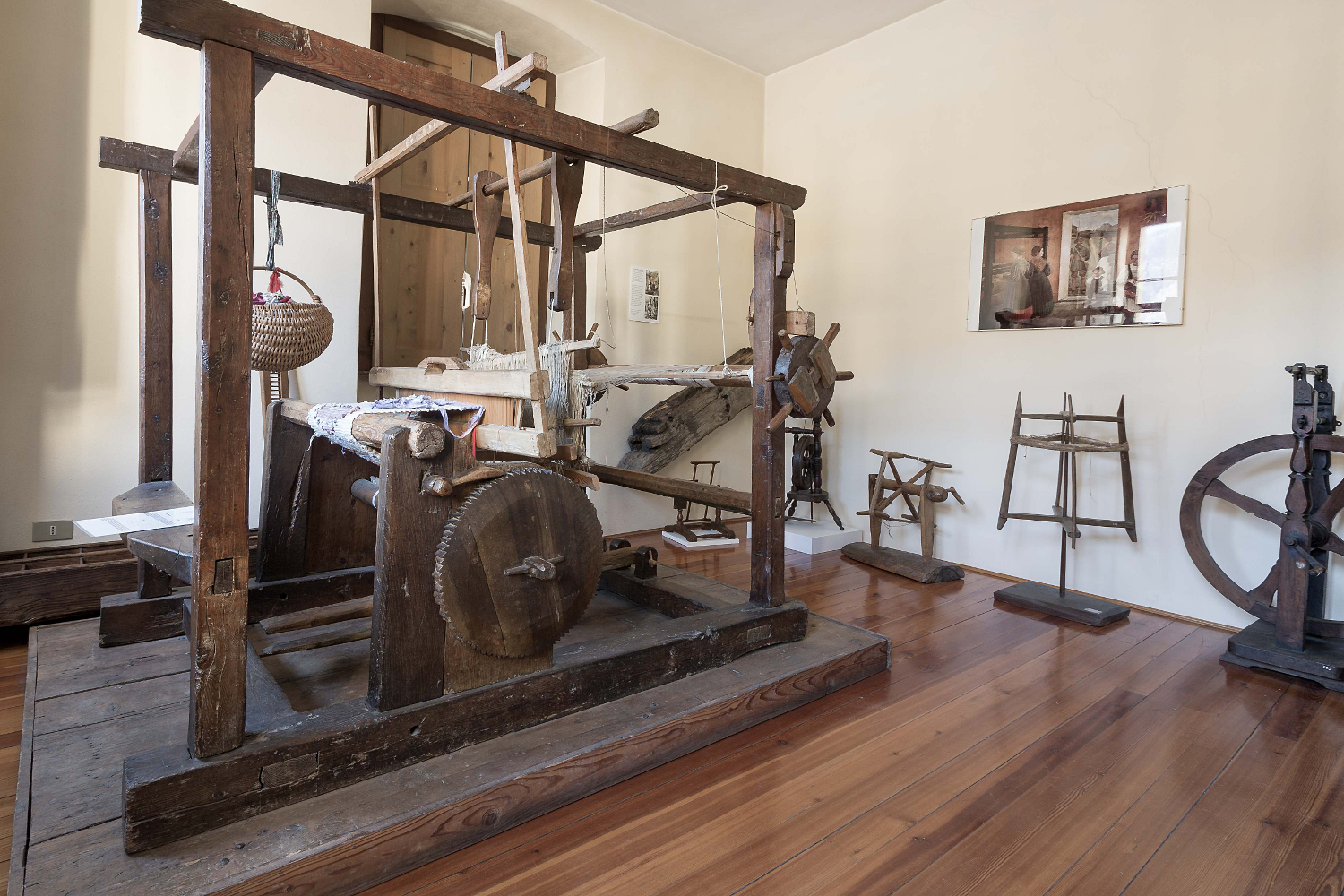
Hand loom

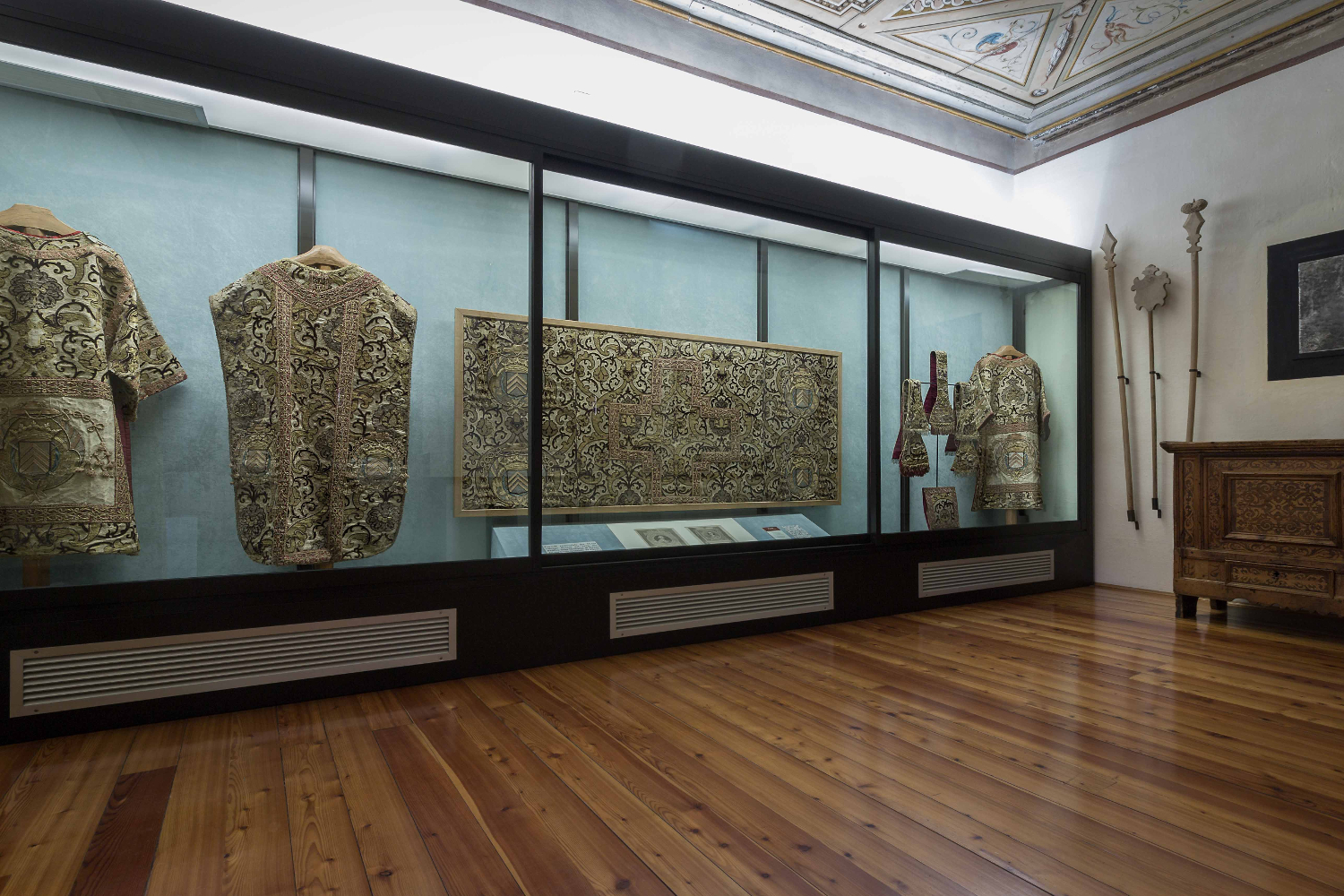
17th century vestments

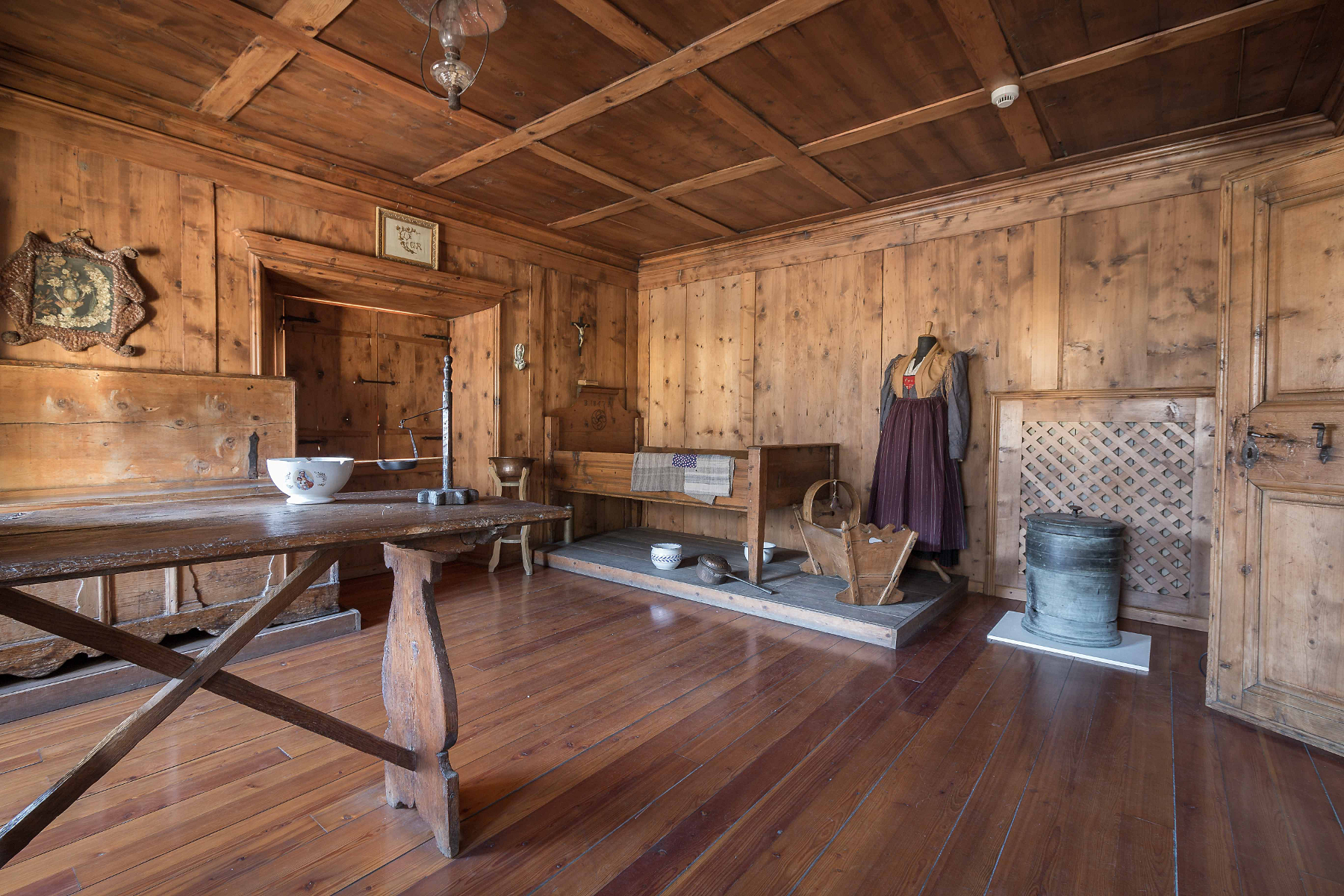
"Stua" typical wood panelled room
