= Marguerite Stuber Pearson =

American artist (1898–1978)

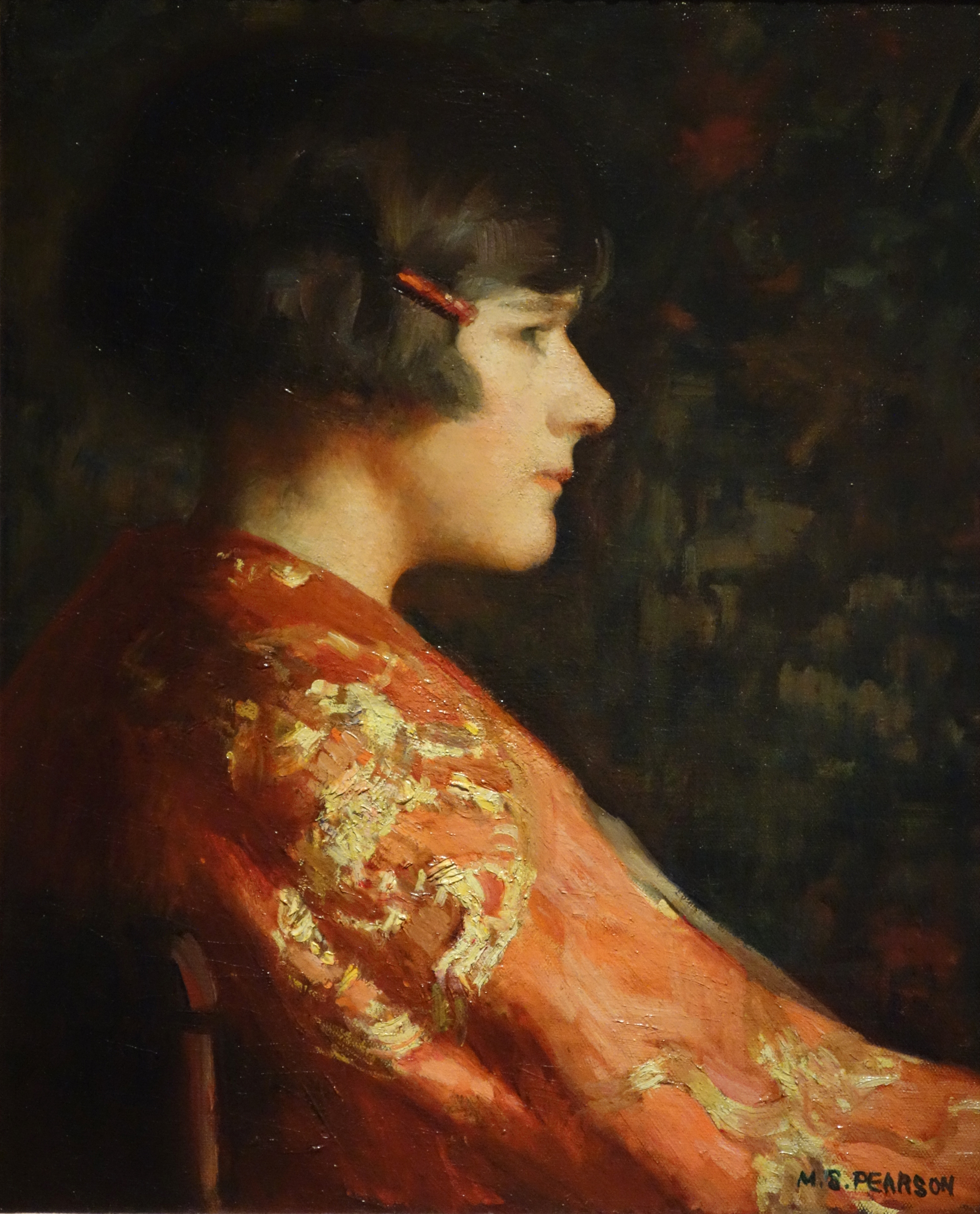
Self portrait by Marguerite Stuber Pearson, 1921 (Peabody Essex Museum, Salem, MA)

Marguerite Stuber Pearson (August 1, 1899 — April 2, 1978) was an American artist, a painter in the style of the Boston School.

== Early life ==
Marguerite Stuber Pearson was born in Philadelphia, Pennsylvania, the daughter of Arthur G. Pearson and Ottelia M. Stuber Pearson. Her father was a confectioner who later operated a movie theatre. At age 16, she survived polio; she used a wheelchair through the rest of her life. She studied art at the School of the Museum of Fine Arts, Boston, and independently. Her instructors included Edmund C. Tarbell, Aldro Hibbard, Harry Leith-Ross, and Howard Giles.

== Career ==
Pearson was known for traditional paintings of women seated in warm domestic scenes, at a piano, knitting, or reading, for example. She also painted some nudes, still lifes, and landscapes. Her models were sometimes dressed in older period fashions and surrounded by historical furnishings. An early show of hers, at the Somerville Public Library in 1924, was greeted with appreciation for both her works and her "battle against great odds". She became a member of the Guild of Boston Artists in 1930, and had regular shows under their auspices into the 1950s. An approving reviewer for The Boston Globe commented that "She doesn't distort the faces or figures in her portraits... she doesn't upset the laws of gravity in her landscapes. She sees straight and she paints straight." A later show at the Guild, in 1947, impressed another reviewer with the "compelling calm" and "perceptive tenderness" of Pearson's portraits.

Her works were also a feature in the annual art show in Springville, Utah for decades, from the 1930s into the 1970s.

== Personal life ==
Marguerite Stuber Pearson lived permanently in Rockport, Massachusetts from 1942, in a home and studio she had custom built to her needs. She died there in 1978, aged 78 years. She left many of her unsold paintings to the Rockport Art Association, which also has an archive of her papers, photographs, and sketchbooks. She also remembered the Springville Museum of Art in her will, with two paintings. In 2011, the Guild of Boston Artists hosted a show of Pearson's works. The Rockport Art Association gives an annual gold medal award named for Pearson.
