= Stübner =

Stübner / Stuebner / Stubner is a German surname. Notable people with the surname include:

- Berndt Stübner (1947–2022), German actor, puppet maker, playwright and theatre director
- Carl Stubner, American talent manager
- Jörg Stübner (1965–2019), German footballer
- Markus Stübner, one of the Zwickau prophets
