= Dedrick Brandes Stuber =

American painter

- Born: May 3, 1878; New York City, U.S.
- Died: August 18, 1954 (aged 76); West Hollywood, California, U.S.
- Occupation: Painter
- Children: 2

Dedrick Brandes Stuber (May 3, 1878 - August 18, 1954) was an American painter. He was born in New York City, and he became a painter in California in 1920. One of his paintings is at the Smithsonian American Art Museum in Washington, D.C.
