= Matinée (disco) =

In Argentina and other South American countries, a matinée (also spelled matiné) is a discothèque open to teenagers (usually between 14 and 18) before midnight. It was introduced in the 1990s because laws prohibited young people from going to dance in bars and nightclubs that served alcoholic drinks.

Throughout the 20th century up to the 1980s, the word matinée was used in Argentina for the first film exhibition of the day, usually around 2 p.m. and often intended for children. A matinée would usually feature a double feature of two films, with a live performance in between (usually a singer or comedy act) in the early decades of the century.

A loanword to Spanish from French word matinée (in turn from the French matin: 'morning'), the word was used in France (although not in its literal sense) to contrast from soirée (from soir: 'evening') and from nuit ('night').

== Features ==
The usual age range is 14 to 18, although some clubs admit 13-year-olds. The official schedule established by the Government of Argentina is from 8 p.m. to midnight; in some provinces, the clubs must close by 11:30. The law prohibits smoking and alcoholic drinks. In practice, smoking is widespread. To circumvent the prohibition of alcohol, many young people drink at a friend's house or in a nearby park before heading to the matinee. Youngsters in Argentina call this the previa ("before") going to the club.
