= David A. Wittkower =

American documentary filmmaker

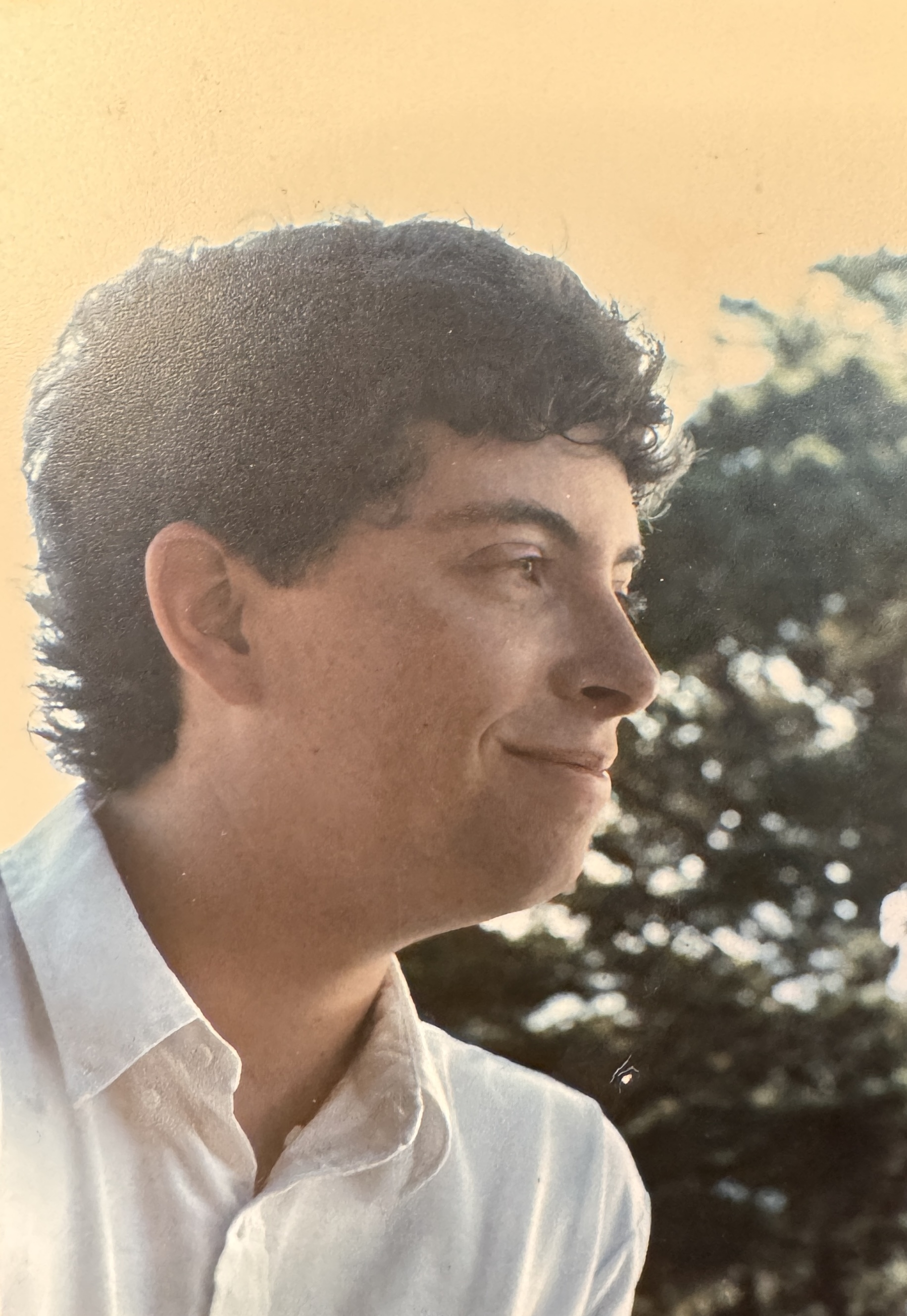
- Born: David Andrew Wittkower; March 22, 1960 (age 66); Boston, Massachusetts, U.S.
- Education: American Film Institute
- Occupation: Documentary filmmaker
- Years active: 1980s–present
- Known for: Documentary films
- Spouse: Tonia Reinertson (m. 1996)
- Children: 1

David Andrew Wittkower (born March 22, 1960) is an American documentary filmmaker known for directing and producing nonfiction films. He has been involved in more than 20 film projects, with work broadcast on networks including PBS, Discovery Channel, Outdoor Channel, and History Channel.

== Early life and education ==
Wittkower was born on March 22, 1960, in Boston, Massachusetts, the son of Andrew Benedict Wittkower and Mary Nora Shotter. He grew up in Rockport, where he graduated from Rockport High School in 1979.

He later attended the American Film Institute in Los Angeles, where he studied Cinematography.

Wittkower has lived in Los Angeles since 1981.

== Career ==
Wittkower is a documentary filmmaker whose work focuses on nonfiction storytelling, often centered on working professions and specialized communities. His films have explored subjects including firefighters, maritime crews, rodeo performers, and fishing communities.

His work has been broadcast on PBS, Discovery Channel, Outdoor Channel, and History Channel.

Wittkower has also worked as a cinematographer and producer and operates a production company based in Los Angeles.

=== USCGC Eagle (2010) ===
Wittkower directed and produced USCGC Eagle, a documentary following cadets aboard the United States Coast Guard training vessel. Filmed over nearly two years, the film documents cadet training, including navigation and emergency response procedures.

The film received a silver award for excellence in filmmaking at the Honolulu International Film Festival.

=== Dead in the Water (2017) ===
Dead in the Water is a documentary examining the impact of federal regulations on the New England ground fishing industry. The concept originated from Wittkower's observations of the decline of the Gloucester fishing fleet compared to his childhood.

The project took approximately two and a half years to complete and was Wittkower's fifteenth documentary film.

The film premiered in Rockport, Massachusetts, on November 18, 2017, and was later screened in multiple communities across Massachusetts and Maine.

The film received the award for Excellence in Cinematography for a Documentary at the Depth of Field International Film Festival in 2018.

In a review published by the Lincoln County News, the film was described as presenting the decline of the fishing industry from the perspective of fishermen and their communities.

=== Later work ===
As of 2025, Wittkower was completing TEAM 28, a documentary focused on grassroots Open-wheel modified car racing.

== Filmography ==
- Firefight: Stories from the Front Lines (2000)
- Cowboy Up: Inside the Extreme World of Bull Riding (2002)
- Guardians of the Gate: The Surfboats (2012)
- USCGC Eagle (2010)
- Dead in the Water (2017)
- Bed Bug (2021)
- TEAM 28 (2025)

== Awards and recognition ==
Wittkower's documentary work has received recognition at film festivals.

- USCGC Eagle – Silver Award, Honolulu International Film Festival
- Dead in the Water – Excellence in Cinematography for a Documentary, Depth of Field International Film Festival (2018)

== Personal life ==
Wittkower married Tonia Reinertson in 1996. The couple have one son, born in 2001.
