= Ruth Langland Holberg =

American writer

Ruth Langland Holberg (February 2, 1889 – April 13, 1984) was an American author of children's books.

== Biography ==
She was born in Milwaukee, Wisconsin to Charles and Ida Langland. In 1912 she married Richard Holberg, an artist and illustrator. They moved to Rockport, Massachusetts, where Ruth wrote children's books and Richard illustrated them. Richard died in 1942. Ruth continued to write until her death in 1984.

In addition to children's books, Ruth wrote two cookbooks and several poems.

== Writings ==
A partial list of books written by Holberg:

- "Mitty and Mr. Syrup," by Ruth Langland Holberg and Richard A. Holberg - Hardcover (1935, Doubleday, Doran & Company Inc., NY)
- "Mitty on Mr. Syrup's Farm," by Ruth Langland Holberg and Richard A. Holberg (1936, Doubleday, Doran & Company, NY)
- "Hester and Timothy," by Ruth Langland Holberg and Richard A. Holberg
- "Wee Brigit O'Toole," by Ruth Langland Holberg and Richard A. Holberg (1938, Doubleday, Doran & Company Inc., NY)
- "Oh Susannah," by Ruth And Richard Holberg, Hardcover (1939, Doubleday, Doran & Company Inc., NY)
- "Gloucester Boy," by Ruth Langland Holberg and Richard A. Holberg (1940, Doubleday, Doran & Company Inc., NY)
- "The Bells Of Amsterdam," by Ruth Holberg and Richard Holberg (Hardcover) (1940, Thomas Y. Crowell Company, NY)
- "Marching to Jerusalem," by Ruth Langland Holberg, illustrated by Henrietta Jones (1943, Thomas Y. Crowell Company, NY)
- "Take it Easy Before Dinner," by Ruth Langland Holberg (1945, Thomas Y, Crowell Company, NY)
- "Captain John Smith: The Lad from Lincolnshire," by Ruth Langland Holberg (Unknown Binding - 1946)
- "Tibby's Venture," by Ruth Langland Holberg
- "The Wonderful Voyage," by Ruth Langland Holberg
- "At the Sign of the Golden Anchor," by Ruth Langland Holberg (Unknown Binding - 1947)
- "Gilbert Stuart," by Ruth Langland Holberg (Unknown Binding - 1948)
- "Rowena Carey," by Ruth Holberg (Hardcover - 1949)
- "Abigail Adams," (Real People series) by Ruth Langland Holberg (Unknown Binding - 1950)
- "The Catnip Man," by Ruth Langland Holberg, illustrated by Lisl Weil, (1951, Thomas Y. Crowell Company, NY)
- "Three Birthday Wishes," by Ruth Langland Holberg (Unknown Binding - 1953)
- "The Buffet Cookbook," by Ruth Langland Holberg (Unknown Binding - 1955)
- "Tabitha's Hill," by Ruth Langland Holberg (Unknown Binding - 1956)
- "The Smugglers of Sandy Bay," by Ruth Holberg, illustrated Kurt Werth (Hardcover - 1957)
- "What Happened to Virgilia," by Ruth Holberg (Hardcover - 1963)
