= Twin Lights Soda =

American soft drink company

Coordinates: 42°38′17.4″N 70°34′29.6″W

Twin Lights
- Type: Privately held company
- Industry: Beverages
- Founded: 1907
- Headquarters: Rockport, Massachusetts, United States
- Key people: Pierce Sears
- Products: Twin Lights Soda
- Parent: Thomas Wilson Bottling Co.

Twin Lights was an American soft drink company based in Rockport, Massachusetts, established in the early 1900s. It is known for being one of the last small, independent soda bottlers in the United States, and for its popularity with soda aficionados and local residents.

== History ==
The Thomas Wilson Bottling Company was established in Rockport, Massachusetts, in May 1907, by Thomas Wilson. It began producing its trademark Twin Lights soda (or "tonic", as it is still sometimes referred to regionally) the same year. The Twin Lights name and logo are taken from the twin lighthouses that sit at either end of Thatcher Island, located just off the coast of Rockport (notably, the lighthouses are America’s last and only operating twin lighthouses, and have been designated as a National Historic Landmark).

In the 1930s, more than 100 bottlers operated in Massachusetts, including brands like Chelmsford Ginger Ale, Millis’s Clicquot Club, and Polar Beverages.

Twin Lights’ heyday came during the 1950s and 1960s, when it produced tens of thousands of cases a year and rivaled both Coca-Cola and Pepsi in popularity within the region of Cape Ann, north of Boston.

The sodas became a part of local culture and were, at times, even attributed mythical qualities: The local hospital used to serve Twin Lights ginger ale to patients, while Twin Lights orangeade gained a reputation as a reliable hangover cure.

Over time, many small bottlers were undercut by such factors as changing market demographics, the rise of national supermarkets and the introduction of nonreturnable packaging. Likewise, the production of Twin Lights decreased over the decades as well, but the business was kept alive.

== Present ==
Until 2021, Twin Lights was the only remaining independent bottler in their area. Pierce Sears, great-grandson of founder Thomas Wilson, operated the small business in the same original Rockport location, producing cases of Twin Lights soda on the family’s aging machinery, some of which dated back to before World War II. Sears died in 2021.

The distribution of Twin Lights was in the final years restricted mainly to local vendors in Rockport and Gloucester, Massachusetts, and to a handful of residential customers to whom Sears personally delivered the soda.

Twin Lights flavors included cola, orangeade, root beer, lemon-lime, grape, fruit punch, strawberry, cream soda, birch beer, sarsaparilla, golden ginger ale and pale dry ginger ale. Twin Lights also bottled Moxie for many years.
