= Paperhouse =

Paperhouse may refer to:

- Paperhouse (film), a 1988 British film
- Paperhouse Records, a British independent record label
- "Paperhouse", a song by Can from the 1971 album Tago Mago
- The Paper House, a historic house museum largely made out of newspaper
