= Hannah Jumper =

American temperance activist

- Born: 1781
- Died: 1865 (aged 83–84)
- Known for: The "Hatchet Gang" raids in Rockport, Massachusetts

Hannah Jumper (1781–1865) was a primary organizer of a Rockport, Massachusetts, temperance group. After months of planning in 1856, Jumper's "Hatchet Gang" raided Rockport establishments that sold legal and illegal spirits. As a result of the raids, Rockport became a dry town until a voter referendum in 2005.

== Life ==
=== Early life ===
Hannah Jumper was born in 1781, the sixth of eight children to William and Susan (Parsons) Jumper. According to Eleanor C. Parsons, author of Hannah and the Hatchet Gang; Rockport's Revolt Against Rum, it is reasonable to assume that William, returning home from a Revolutionary War battle, might have named his new daughter after the USS Hannah, the first armed vessel to fly the flag of the United States colonies.

Though born to a family of seafaring men, Hannah grew up in Joppa, Massachusetts, the only farming community between Gloucester and Sandy Bay (later to become Rockport) harbors. Through her adolescent years, she grew tall and rawboned, and it was during her teens when Hannah learned how to carry on all the household tasks of her large and impoverished family. It was during this period that Hannah would learn to take care of the sick as well.

Hannah became versed at growing, drying, and steeping herbs as potent cures for all kinds of ailments during this period. When she reached thirty, her favorite sister, Suzanna, died from consumption, her mother two years later from the same disease. Consumption was one of the most common diseases of the 18th and 19th centuries. It would later become known as tuberculosis. No one during Hannah's time knew how to cure it, so liquor became a medicine.

It was because of these constant hardships in taking care of family members, that "Hannah found meaning in her life by going wherever she was needed, by doing for others whenever she could." When she was no longer required on the farm in Joppa, Hannah moved to Rockport. It was there that she would earn her living administering to the sick with her homemade remedies and by laundering and mending clothing for the townspeople.

=== Lead up to the raids ===
By the early 19th century, excessive drinking was considered to be a sufficient social problem that led to the founding of temperance societies in the United States and in Europe. The first founded in the U.S. was in 1808 in Saratoga, New York. By 1833, there were more than 6,000 local societies in the country. At first the temperance groups' campaigns were directed only at distilled spirits, but after 1836 they were aimed at all alcoholic beverages. In Rockport, from its earliest days of settlement, there had been efforts to control excessive drinking. Vendors of spirits were legally bound to present good-conduct certificates in order to secure licenses. On March 11, 1847, townspeople formed an abstinence membership such as the "Bay Tent of Rechabites". This local organization would incorporate over one hundred abstainers.

As a result of its remote geographic location, residents of Rockport, especially women, were lacking economically and intellectually. All but illiterate, Hannah and the other villagers were informed of news events twice a week with the arrival of The Gloucester Telegraph, a newspaper that was delivered by stagecoach to Rockport. Editorials during this time were of slavery in the United States and the shameful extravagances of the people of New York and of Paris. The women of Rockport, and notably Hannah, became increasingly agitated at the lavish spending of what was vogue in Paris and the disgraceful overindulgence exemplified by American women of wealth. The ladies were offended by the newspaper's advertisements which flaunted such luxuries. But the most shameful, outrageous expense of all to Hannah and her gang, according to the author Parsons, was the more than four and half million dollars the country frittered away on wines and liquors.

The men of Rockport were spending large portions of their earnings on rum. They said rum was as much a part of fishing as bait. Still, the $157 each fisherman brought home at the end of nine months of fishing was not enough to feed a family. In an era when a barrel of flour cost $10, the men were spending 1 3/8 cents for a drink of rum. Parsons adds that "all this profligate spending could not help but fan the women's content."

Between the time of the forming of the "Bay Tent of Rechabites" and the 1856 town meeting-appointed "Smellin' Committee", liquor continued to flow unchecked. The Smellin' Committee of four agents was empowered to enforce the statutes set by the town fathers, but it went down to defeat by open defiance. Author Marshall W.C. Swan writes that "it was estimated that the sale of spirits (legal and illegal) had climbed 250 percent in the previous four years. The time for talk had ended."

In the summer of 1856, after weeks, perhaps months, of recruiting and planning, the women had maintained their secret well. Town officials, unaware of the impending event, were making plans for the town's third Independence Day celebration. Parsons writes, "the festivities got underway the night before the Fourth, and not unexpectedly resulted in a drunken fracas which spilled over into the next week. However, the committee of four agents and the two town constables stood by clumsy and inefficient, making only token efforts to seek out the guilty offenders. This episode became the last straw. The women were organized and ready."

=== The assault by Hannah and the Hatchet Gang ===
On the morning of July 8, 1856, Hannah Jumper, then 75-years-old, awoke per custom to the sun rising over Sandy Bay harbor. The plan for the raid had been finalized the night before. The group which had surveyed where most of the liquor activities were taking place had secretly marked small crosses in white chalk in front of the offending establishments. They also reminded each other, "Don't forget the shawls."

It was before 9 am when Hannah, along with other leaders of the movement, left their dwellings to head to the center of town, Dock Square. The gathering mob began to sweep in some non-members to their cause, and the author Parsons reports that there could be heard an occasional outcry of "get a hammer," "get a tomahawk," "get a hatchet." One member of the predominantly female crew carried a hand-made banner of rectangular shape and of unbleached cotton. Crimson tassels adorned it, and a hatchet was painted in black from corner to corner. (Parsons notes that after the raid the banner was somehow lost, and found again, sold for $5 to the Gloucester Historical Society, later returned for $5 to the Rockport Public Library who then gave it to the Sandy Bay Historical Society, where it now resides.)

The group swelled to over 200 townspeople as they began going through the town and destroying its liquor supplies. From under their shawls on that hot summer's day, "Hannah and her Hatchet Gang" unleashed their weapons, raiding each of the marked locations where liquor was being, or had been, sold legally and illegally. According to Herbert A. Kenny's Cape Ann: Cape America, "If shops or homes were closed, the gang forced themselves in. They seized casks, demijohns, jugs and bottles that contained the bane of their happiness and emptied their contents into the street – occasionally making use of their hatchets (with which they were liberally supplied) to hasten the flow of the hated liquid."

Parsons writes, "the ludicrous spectacle ends at two o'clock in the afternoon. Seven hundred to a thousand persons thronged Dock Square, sniffing at two to three hundred gallons of spilled liquor. Some men shuffled about as they had earlier in the day, wondering what to expect next, some scarcely believing in what they had witnessed. Some were downright indignant at their wives but others openly admired their show of courage." In all, "Hannah and the gang" raided thirteen establishments during their five-hour assault, leaving hatchet marks on fifty barrels and destroying $700 worth of liquor. It was reported the men described Rockport as a mammoth punch bowl, with which the smell of rum drifted for two miles across the bay.

=== Aftermath ===
While many shop owners were angry with the women, most only threatened them and no one was arrested. Jim Brown was the owner of a small grocery store, and according to some townspeople was a man with one of the most questionable reputations in all of Rockport. Brown became the angriest man in town. After seeing his store entered and its liquor contents destroyed, he brought up charges in an Essex County court, of breaking and entering and the destruction of property, against the entire gang of hatchet-wielding women. The verdict, in favor of the women, was appealed time and time again. In the end, the original verdict was upheld and Brown was ordered to pay the court costs of $346.25 to the defendants.

The Woman's Christian Temperance Union began staging their own raids in other parts of the country in the 1870s, and public support for prohibition increased to the point where an amendment was passed to prohibit the sale of alcohol in the United States, which lasted from 1920 until 1933.

Until 1966, Rockport residents voted on the issue of the sale of liquor in every general election. In that year, the state laws regarding the sale of liquor were amended. The new law stated that if the liquor issue were voted on in the affirmative or the negative in three consecutive elections, then the issue would be dropped from the ballot. In 1966, 1968 and 1970, Rockport residents voted against the sale of liquor in their community. A petition with 10 percent of registered voters was required before a referendum could be placed on the ballot. Such a referendum was held in 1998, and was defeated. In 2005 it was approved, and restaurants can serve and sell alcohol to customers who are having a meal.

In 2011, modifications to the existing town regulations were instituted as the definition of a meal: "The term meal shall include hors d'oeuvres, appetizers, desserts, sandwiches, soups, salads, entrees and prepared foods but shall exclude chips, nuts, pretzels, popcorn and other snack food..." Beverages can also be served while waiting to be seated: "Alcoholic beverages may be served in a designated area for those waiting to be seated for dining if a reservation has been made with restaurant personnel." In 2019, Rockport began allowing alcohol to be sold directly to the consumer.

The Hannah Jumper House at 35 Mount Pleasant Street, which was refurbished in 2017, is a Rockport landmark.
