= Long Beach (Rockport) =

Coastal neighborhood in Rockport, Massachusetts

Coordinates: 42.6306°N 70.6173°W

- Neighborhood
- Location in Massachusetts
- Country: United States
- State: Massachusetts
- County: Essex
- Town: Rockport
- Time zone: UTC-5 (EST)
  - Summer (DST): UTC-4 (EDT)

Long Beach is a coastal neighborhood on the eastern shore of Rockport, Massachusetts, characterized by 152 seasonal cottages built on a sandy spit barrier beach. The neighborhood faces significant vulnerabilities from climate change, including sea level rise and increasingly severe storm events, making it a focal point for debates over coastal adaptation strategies.

== Geography and formation ==
Long Beach is located on a barrier beach on Rockport's eastern coast, forming a natural protection for the Saratoga salt marsh behind it. The sandy spit extends approximately three-quarters of a mile along the coast, ending at a narrow creek that allows ocean water to feed the tidal marsh. For thousands of years prior to development, the dune system shifted naturally with the tides and seasons.

== History ==
In the 1800s, Finnish granite workers emigrated to Rockport and armored the coast with breakwaters, creating a series of safe harbors to protect the fishing and shipbuilding industries. The availability of quarried granite and the construction of hard infrastructure became part of the Cape's cultural imaginary.

In the early 1900s, 149 seasonal cottages and accessory buildings were constructed on top of the barrier beach. The cottages were initially defended from storm surge by a wooden bulkhead. Fill was dumped on the dune system, and the area was developed with manicured lawns featuring ornamental plant species including roses, hydrangeas, and catmint.

When the wooden bulkhead burned in 1931, the Town of Rockport and the Commonwealth of Massachusetts split the cost to construct a 3,350-foot concrete seawall. In 1958, a fierce late-season nor'easter washed over the first wall and toppled it seaward onto the beach. Subsequent storms in 1976, 1985, 1991, and 2018 caused further damage to the seawall and eroded the fill behind it. Parts of the current seawall date to 1931 and 1959.

== Land ownership and economics ==
The cottages at Long Beach operate under a unique split ownership arrangement. Families own the cottages but lease the land from the town of Rockport. These leases provide approximately 8% of the town's annual revenue, amounting to about $2.5 million per year when combined with property taxes on the cottages. The current lease agreements are set to expire on December 31, 2033.

== Climate vulnerabilities ==
Long Beach faces multiple climate-related hazards documented through municipal reports, engineering studies, and climate projections. All cottages lie within the Federal Emergency Management Agency (FEMA)'s VE (velocity) flood zone, indicating risk of high-velocity waves during a 100-year storm event. Climate projections indicate that the seawall will be impacted by 12 inches of sea level rise well before the 41 inches expected by mid-century. The cottages face the threat of storm surge damage from both the ocean side and the marsh during powerful nor'easters or hurricanes.

Sand has scoured the seawall over past decades, reducing the area of public sandy beach. The seawall's structural stability has been threatened by a series of nor'easters. By the Massachusetts Office of Coastal Zone Management's predictions, nearly 100 percent of the cottages will flood in an annual storm by 2050.

=== Coastal adaptation debate ===
In response to growing climate concerns and the approaching lease expiration, Rockport's municipal government formed the Long Beach Options Committee to "consider the Town's options … with due regard for environmental issues, in particular rising sea levels." The committee hosted public meetings twice monthly from June 2021 to March 2022, increasing visibility of climate hazards at Long Beach.

The committee considered three primary paths forward: renewing the leases with various conditions, selling the lots and seawall while retaining the beach for public use, or removing the seawall and cottages to allow the area to return to a natural state.

For Long Beach to persist into the next century, proponents of managed retreat argue that the leases would need to be terminated, structures deconstructed, the seawall crushed, and the dune restored. This would represent a fundamental shift in ownership and, more broadly, a shift in cultural landscape practices on Cape Ann from fortified coastlines to reconstructed ecosystems. However, advocates note that even if the cottages and seawall are removed, the resulting beach, dune, and marsh systems would be a novel reconstruction rather than a return to an untouched barrier beach landscape.

Geographer E. Lisa F. Schipper has identified the seawall as an example of "maladaptation"—infrastructure that increases exposure to climate change impacts. The seawall contributes to a false sense of security, encouraging sustained development and increasing the potential for loss of life and property during storm events. The structure also causes beach erosion through a phenomenon known as "downwash," resulting in the loss of approximately one foot of beach sand per year, requiring occasional replenishment.

=== Current status ===
In 2023, the Rockport Board of Selectmen renewed the 10-year leases between Rockport and the cottage owners until December 31, 2033. The town applied for emergency grants to begin repairing portions of the seawall, despite ongoing community debate around its long-term viability. The town received a $2.8 million grant from FEMA to repair sections of the wall damaged in the 2018 storm.
