= Halibut Point State Park =

State park in Massachusetts, United States

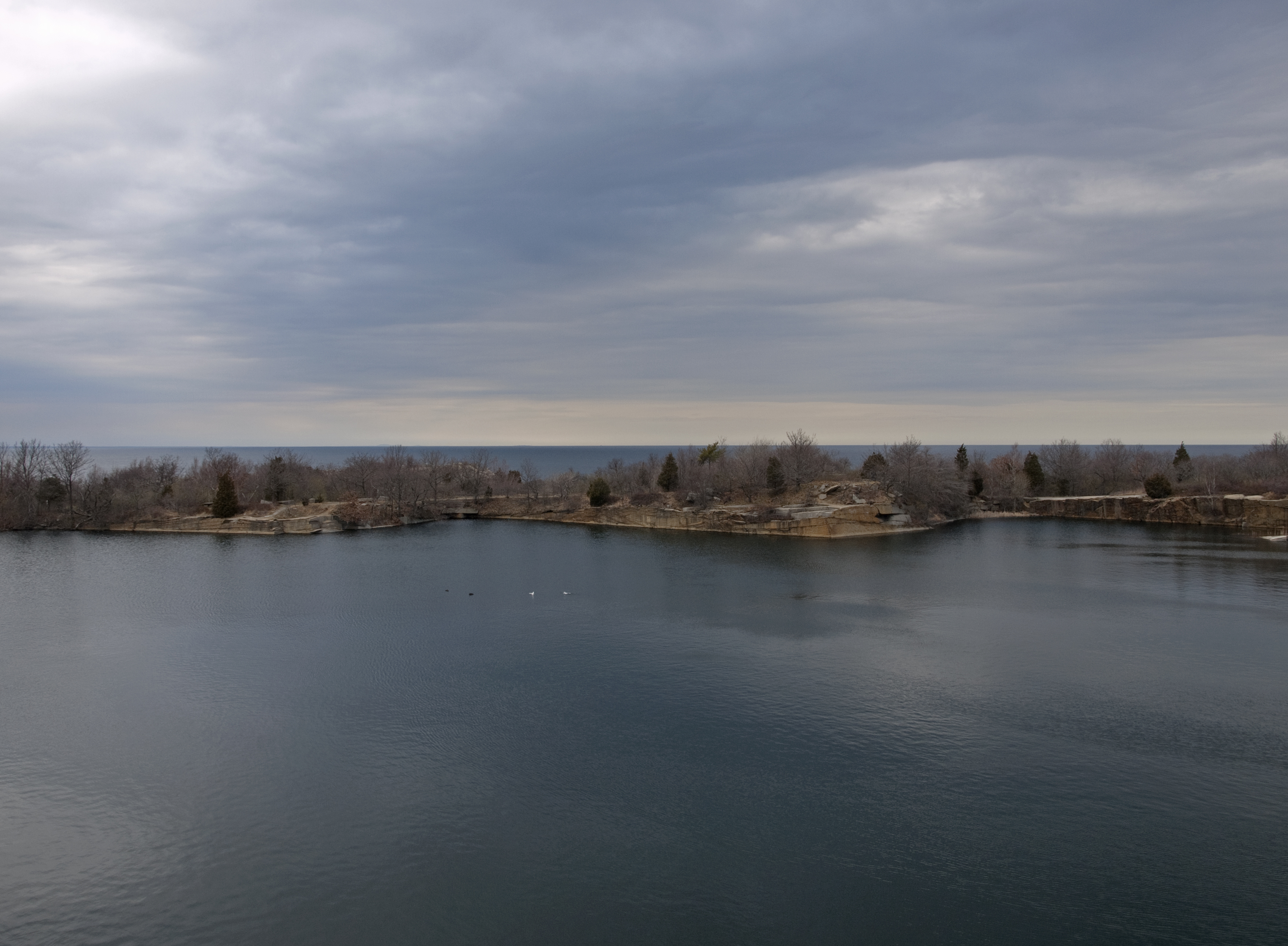
- Panorama of the park

- Location within Massachusetts Location within the United States
- Location: Rockport, Essex, Massachusetts, United States
- Coordinates: 42°41′22″N 70°37′59″W
- Area: 67 acres (27 ha)
- Elevation: 20 ft (6.1 m)
- Established: 1929 & 1981
- Operator: Massachusetts Department of Conservation and Recreation & Trustees of Reservations
- Website: Halibut Point State Park & Halibut Point Reservation

Halibut Point State Park and Halibut Point Reservation are adjacent parcels of conserved, oceanside land located on Cape Ann in the town of Rockport, Massachusetts. Once the Babson Farm granite quarry, the properties are cooperatively managed by the Trustees of Reservations and the Massachusetts Department of Conservation and Recreation . The adjacent Sea Rocks area is owned by the town of Rockport and is also open to the public.

== History ==
The granite that makes up Halibut Point is estimated to be 440 million years old. It was quarried here as early as 1840. The scale of operations grew when the Babson Farm quarry was acquired by the Rockport Granite Company. Those operations ended with the collapse of the Cape Ann granite industry in 1929. Halibut Point Reservation was created when the Trustees of Reservations acquired a parcel on the east side of the quarry in 1934. In the last years of World War II, the remaining quarry area saw new usage with the construction of a 60-foot (18 m) fire control tower that was intended to assist in aiming the coastal weapons defending the harbors at Boston and Plymouth. In 1981, the state purchased 56 acres (23 ha) of land, resulting in the creation of Halibut State Park.

== Flora and fauna ==
The quarry is filled with water, with a maximum depth of about 60 feet (18 m) at its lowest spot. Due to shallow soil, constant onshore winds, and a history of frequent fires, the point's vegetation includes few trees. Catbriar, bayberry, blueberry, arrowwood, shadbush, and wildflowers grow among the ledges. Snails, hermit crabs, and sea stars can be found in the tide pools. In winter, seabirds such as loons, grebes, and ducks can be seen feeding offshore.

== Activities and amenities ==
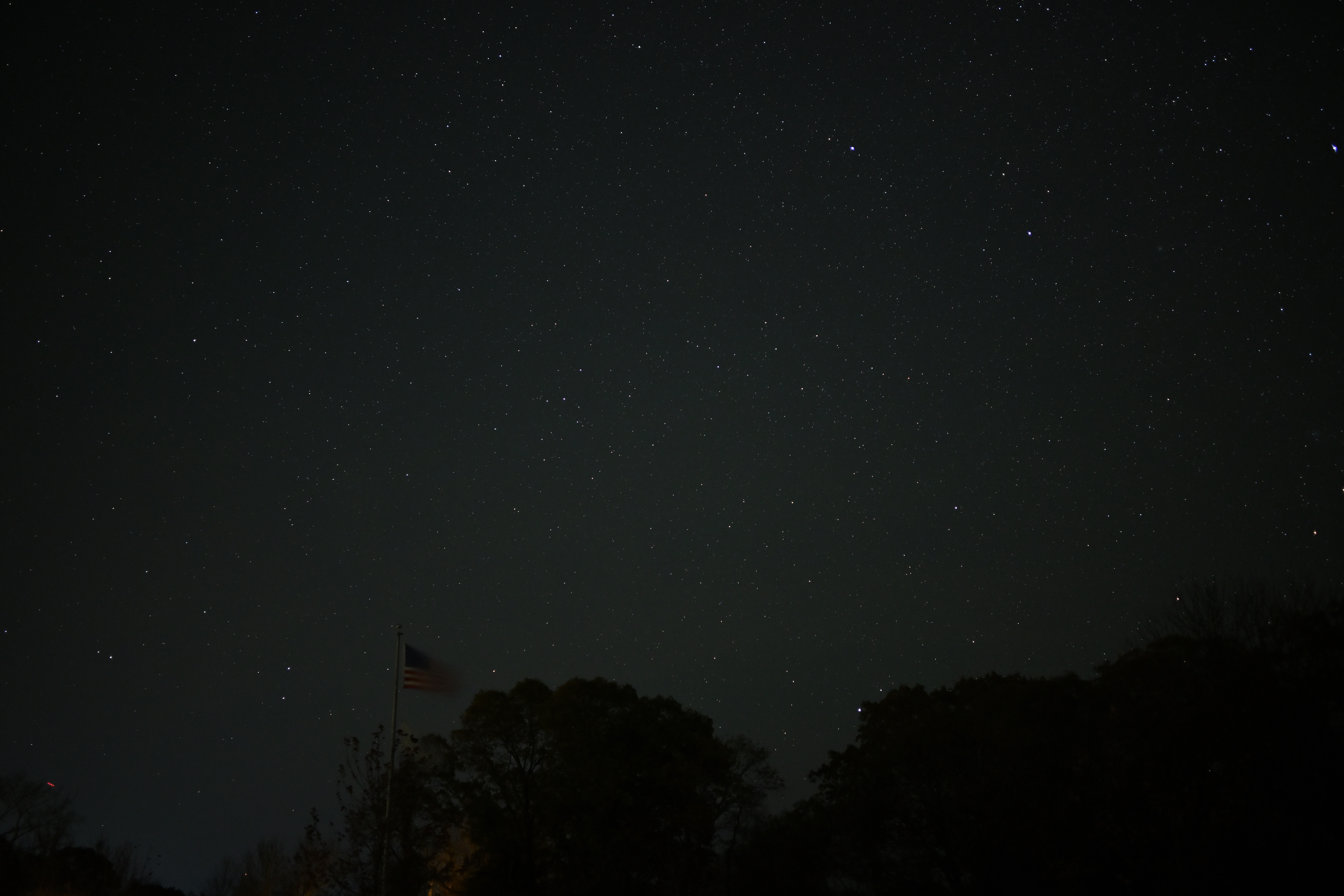
A 5 second exposure of the nighttime stars from the parking lot.

The park offers trails and tidepools, ledges for picnicking, and expansive ocean views. Seaward views can stretch from Crane Beach in Ipswich to the Isles of Shoals off the coast of New Hampshire to Mount Agamenticus in Maine. The one-time fire control tower has a small museum with exhibits on Cape Ann granite quarrying. A self-guided walking tour around the quarry relates the story of the point's granite mining past.

At Bortle Scale Class 4, the park is a popular stargazing site for those in Eastern Massachusetts.
