= Thacher Island National Wildlife Refuge =

Protected area in Massachusetts, United States

- IUCN category IV (habitat/species management area)
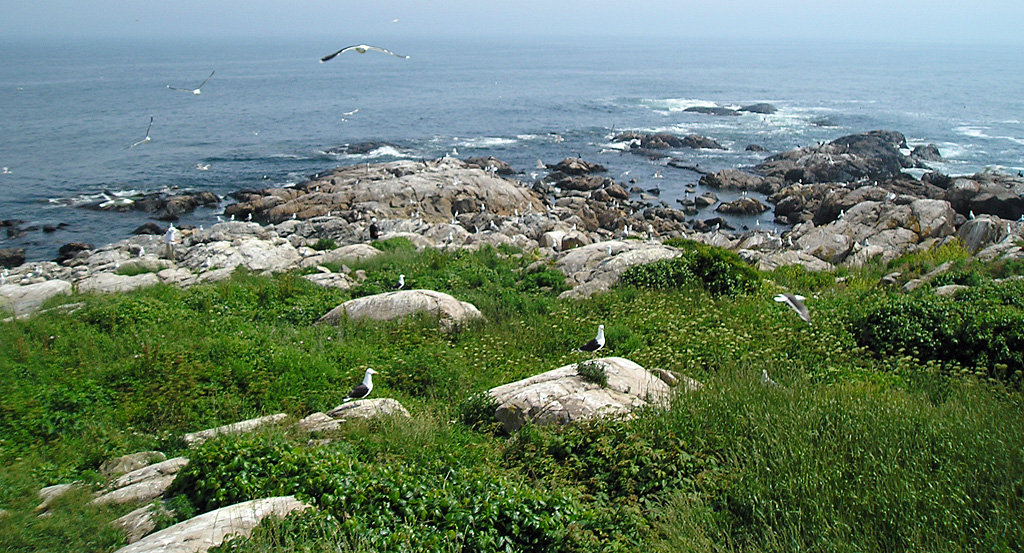

- Location within the United States
- Location: Thacher Island, Massachusetts, United States
- Nearest city: Rockport, Massachusetts
- Coordinates: 42.63866°N 70.57506°W
- Area: 22 acres (0.089 km^{2})
- Established: 1972
- Governing body: U.S. Fish and Wildlife Service
- Website: Thacher Island National Wildlife Refuge

Thacher Island National Wildlife Refuge is a National Wildlife Refuge located on Thacher Island near Rockport, Massachusetts. It is managed under the Parker River National Wildlife Refuge. The U.S. Fish and Wildlife Service currently does not offer any interpretive facilities or programs at Thacher Island Refuge. A foot trail meanders through shrub/thicket, rocky outcrop and other island habitats and affords opportunities to observe and/or photograph birds and other island and offshore wildlife.

The refuge has a surface area of 22 acres (0.089 km^{2}).

== Wildlife & Habitat ==
Thacher Island is home to herring and great black-backed gulls. The refuge serves as a stopover site for songbirds and other migrants to rest and feed during their seasonal migration. Off-shore habitats are used by seals, waterfowl, loons, grebes, cormorants, and alcids.

Historically, the island served as nesting grounds for several species of terns, but over the years it has been overrun by the gulls. Still, Thacher Island has the potential to be re-established as a prime nesting area. The habitat remains ideal for tern breeding. Nesting terns are currently supported on islands strategically located to the north and south of the Thacher Island, and could be attracted to re-establish nesting colonies on the island.
