= Paper House =

Museum in Rockport, Massachusetts, United States

Coordinates: 42°40′22.7″N 70°38′04.7″W

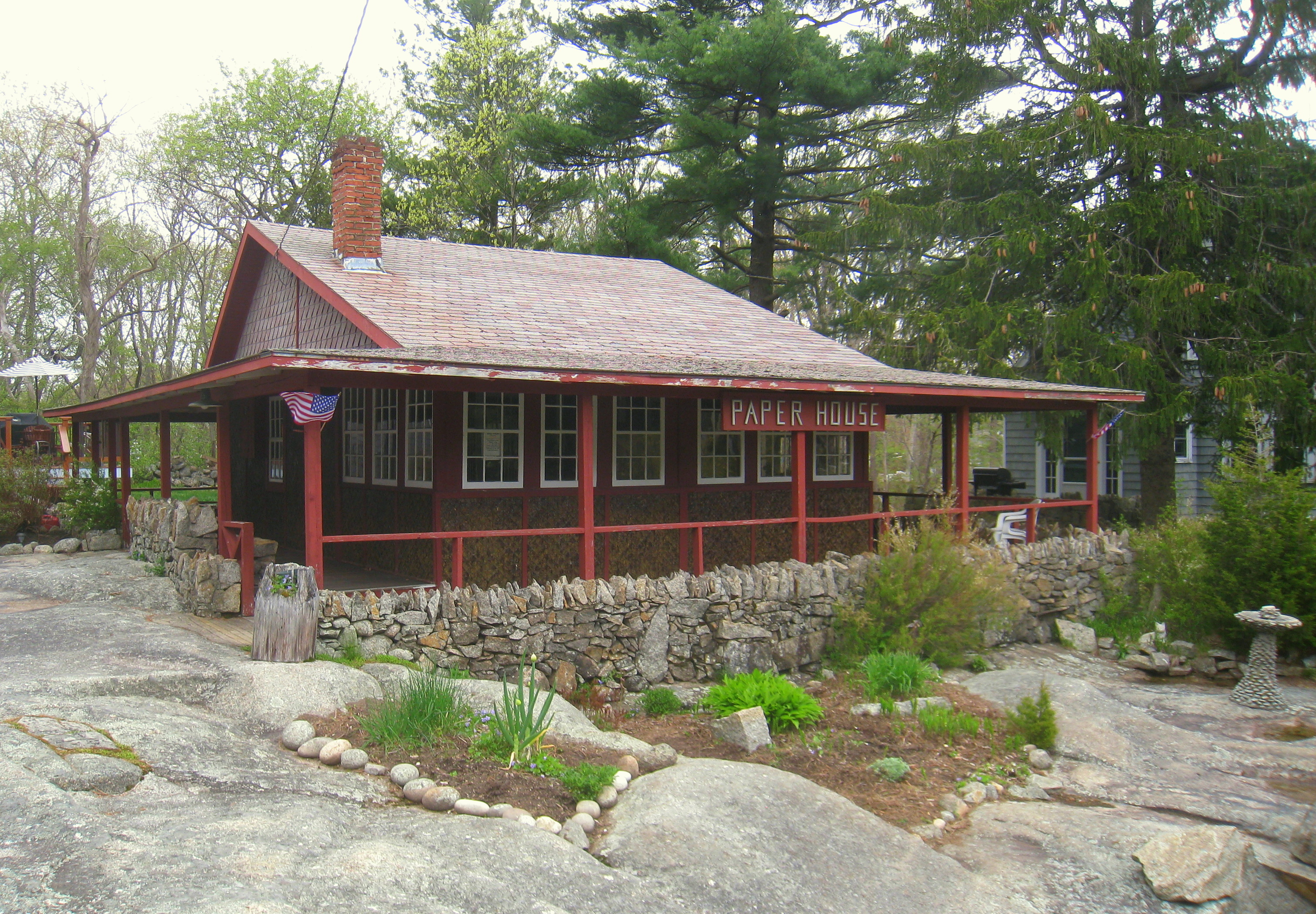
Exterior in 2010

The Paper House is a historic house museum in Rockport, Massachusetts, United States. It was constructed between 1922 and 1924 by American engineer Elis F. Stenman as a summer house. He decided to leave the walls unclad and formed only from their varnished newspaper insulation. He later added furniture constructed from rolled newspaper. By 1927 the house had become a tourist attraction. It is now run as a museum by members of the Stenman family.

== Construction ==
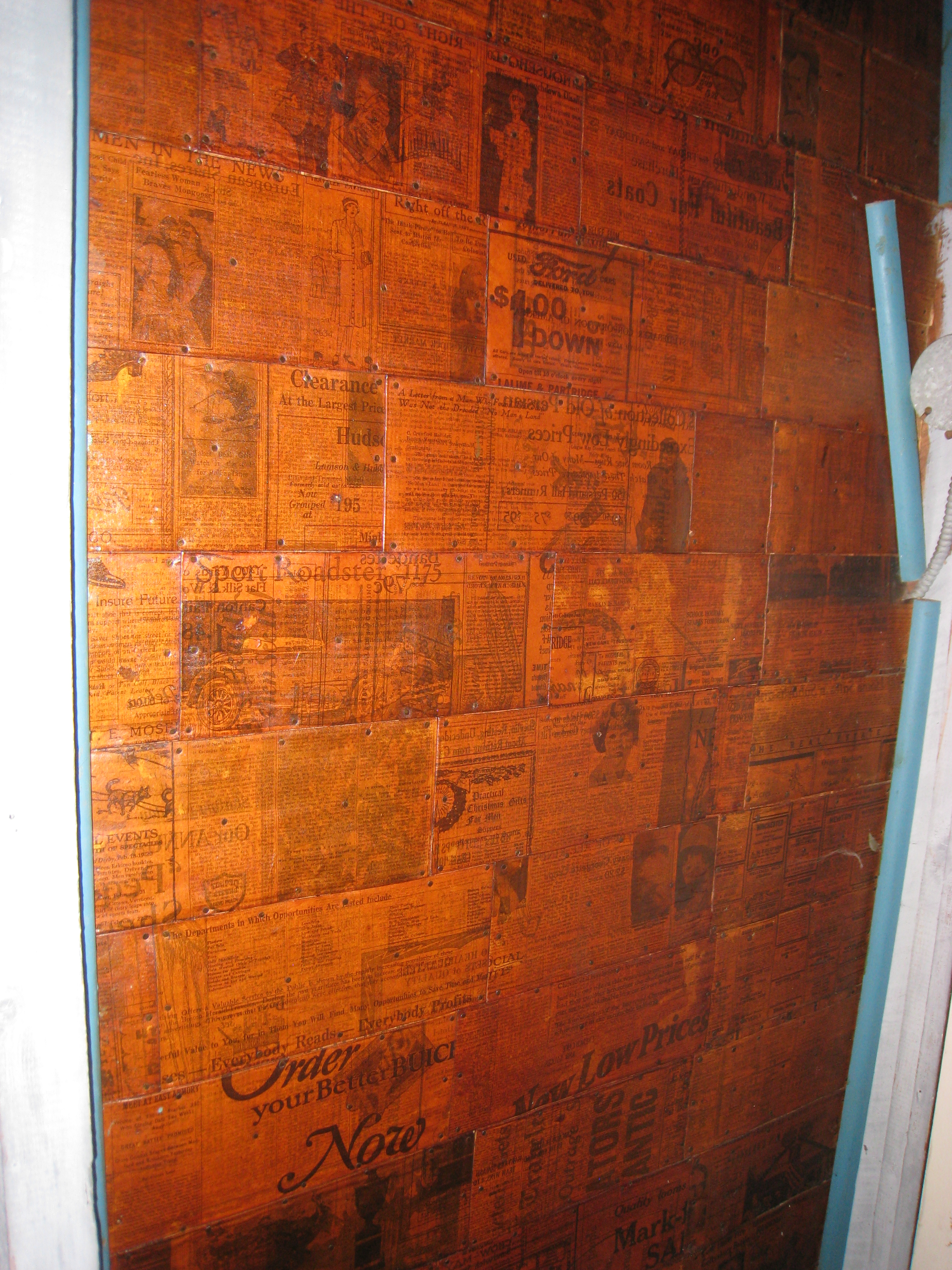
Detail of the interior of a wall

The Paper House is sited at 52 Pigeon Hill Street in Rockport, Massachusetts. It was constructed as a hobby from 1922 by Elis F. Stenman for use as a summer house. Stenman was a Swedish mechanical engineer who built machines for the manufacture of paper clips and tried, unsuccessfully, to invent a steam iron. The house is of traditional wooden frame construction and has a wooden roof and floor.

Stenman had "always resented the daily waste of newspaper" and decided to use the material as insulation for his walls. He made a glue from flour, water and sticky materials such as apple peel. This was mixed with newspapers and pressed to form a 1-inch (25 mm) thick material consisting of around 215 sheets of paper which was used to fill the walls between the timber frame. This wall was then varnished.

The structure was complete by 1924. Stenman had intended to clad the walls with wood but instead decided to leave the newspaper as it was as an experiment into its durability. The house was provided with electricity and running water, though it had no bathrooms – a conventional wooden outhouse was provided outside. Although for practical reasons the fireplace and chimney are brick, the mantlepiece is made of paper.

When the walls survived, Stenman decided to construct furniture from tightly rolled and varnished newspapers. Friends and neighbours helped contribute the newspapers required; the house and furniture reused 100,000 newspapers. The furniture includes a desk made from accounts of Charles A. Lindbergh's 1927 transatlantic flight in the Spirit of St. Louis, and a grandfather clock made from newspapers from the capitals of each of the then 48 US states. The only furniture item not constructed from paper is the piano, which is only clad with the material.

== Operation as museum ==
By 1927, the Paper House had become a tourist attraction, postcards were sold featuring it, and contributions from visitors were sufficient to pay Stenman's running costs. Stenman and his wife occupied the property until 1930, since which it has been solely used for display purposes. A porch extending all around the house was added in the 1930s, helping to protect the paper walls from the weather. It has been re-varnished on occasion, though care has been taken not to obscure the original newsprint. The house remains privately owned by the Stenman family and is run as a museum. It is open to the public daily between April and October, with entry priced at $2.

== Gallery ==
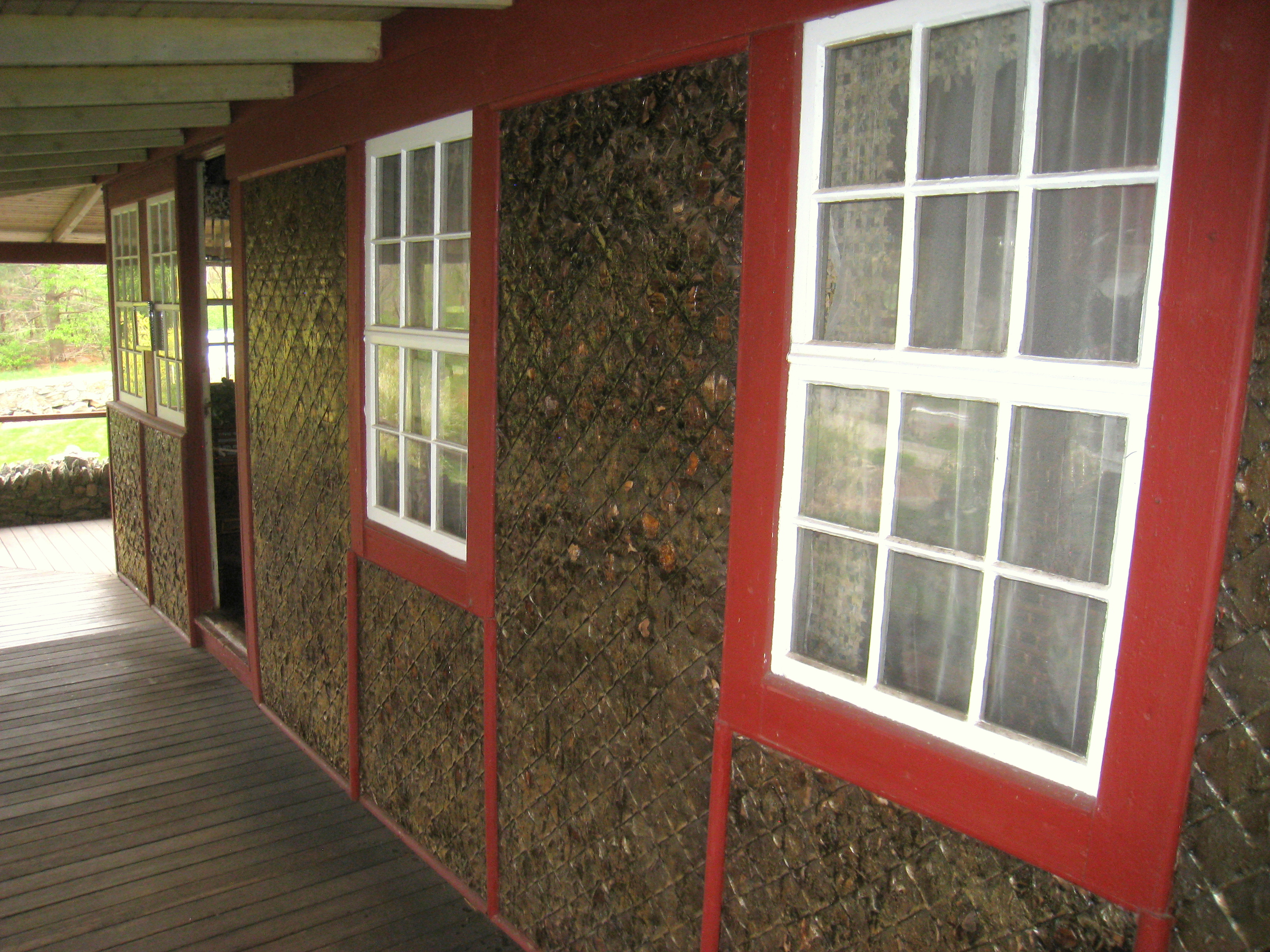
Exterior of a wall

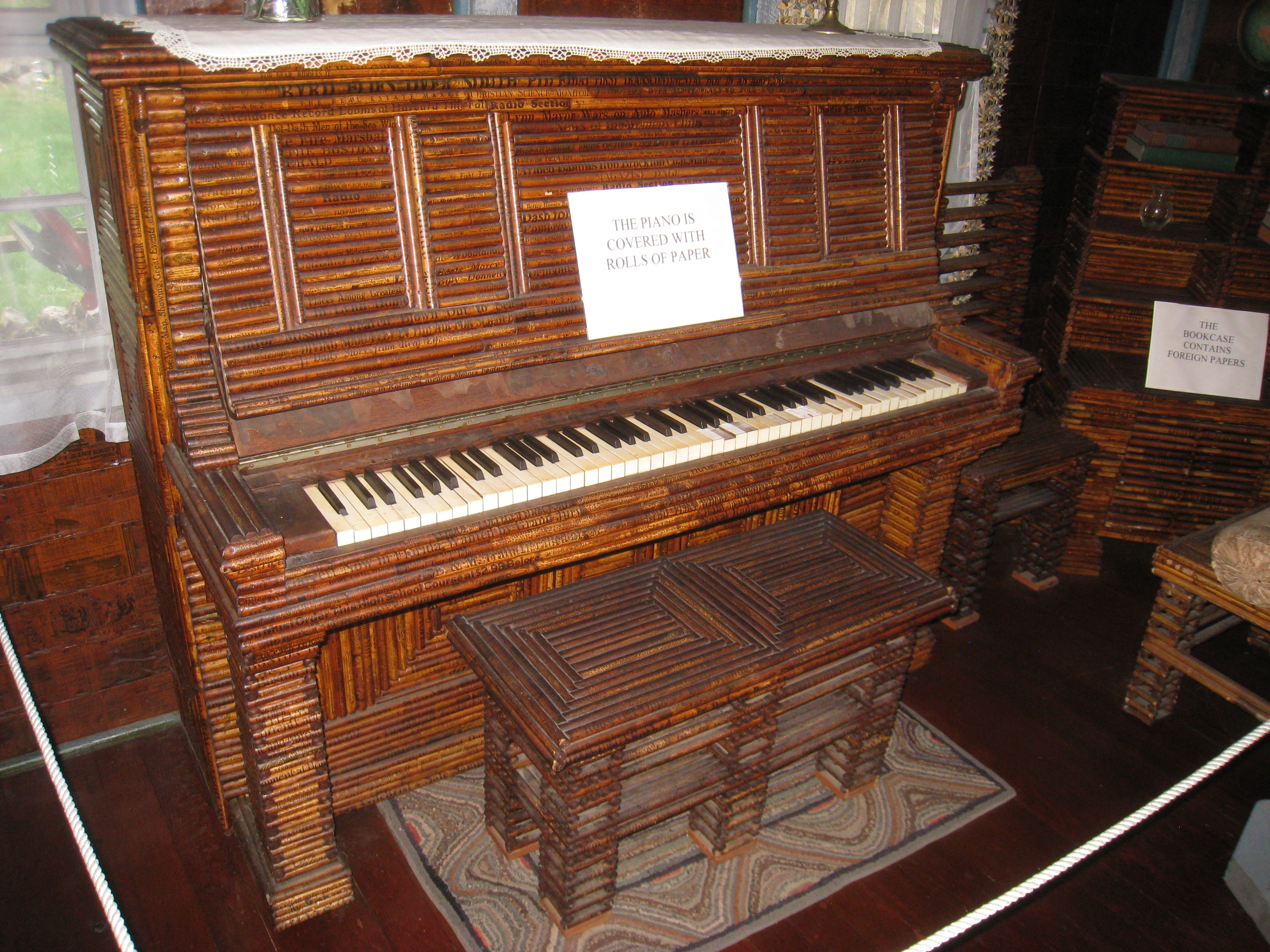
The piano

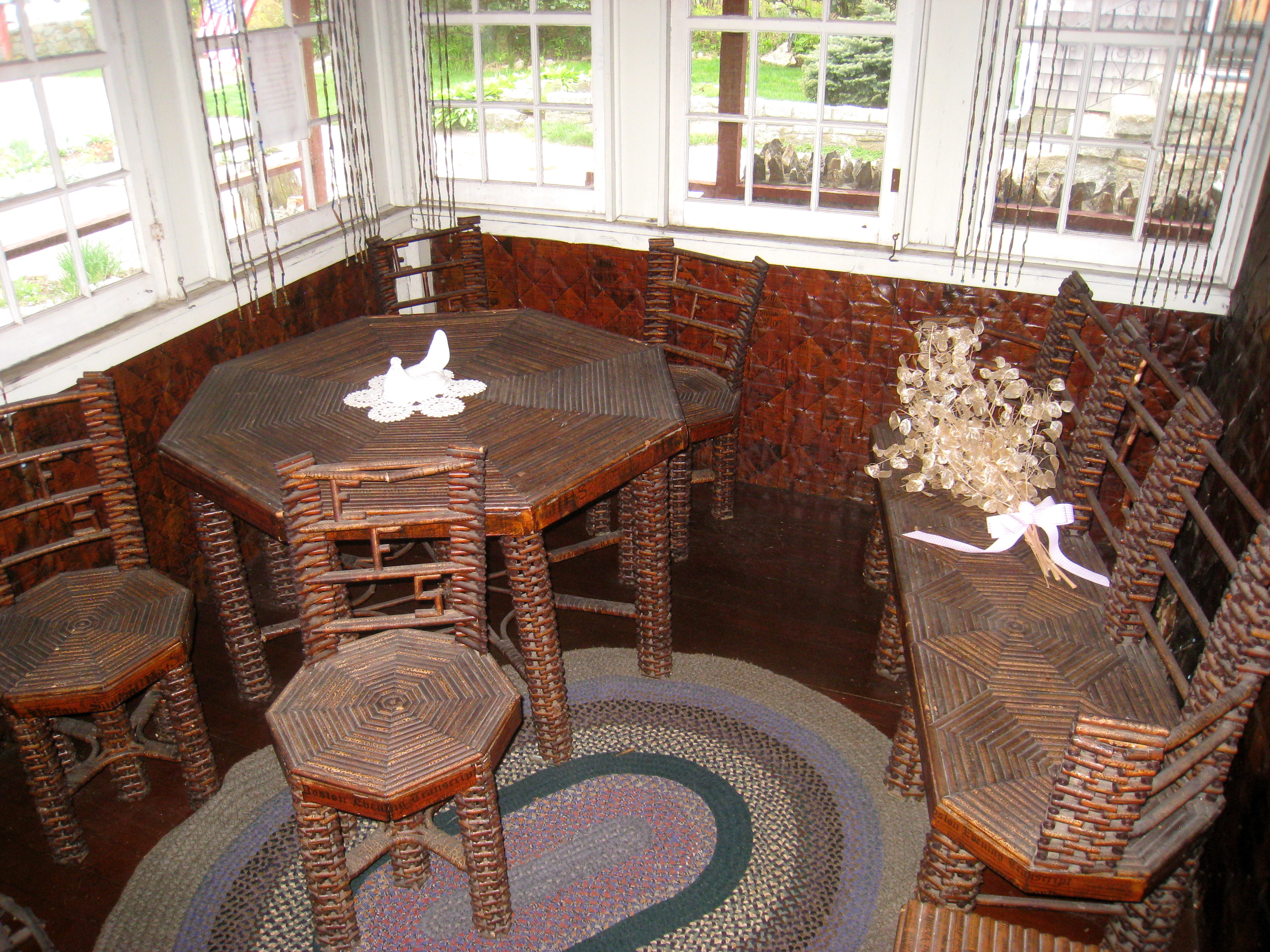
Dining set

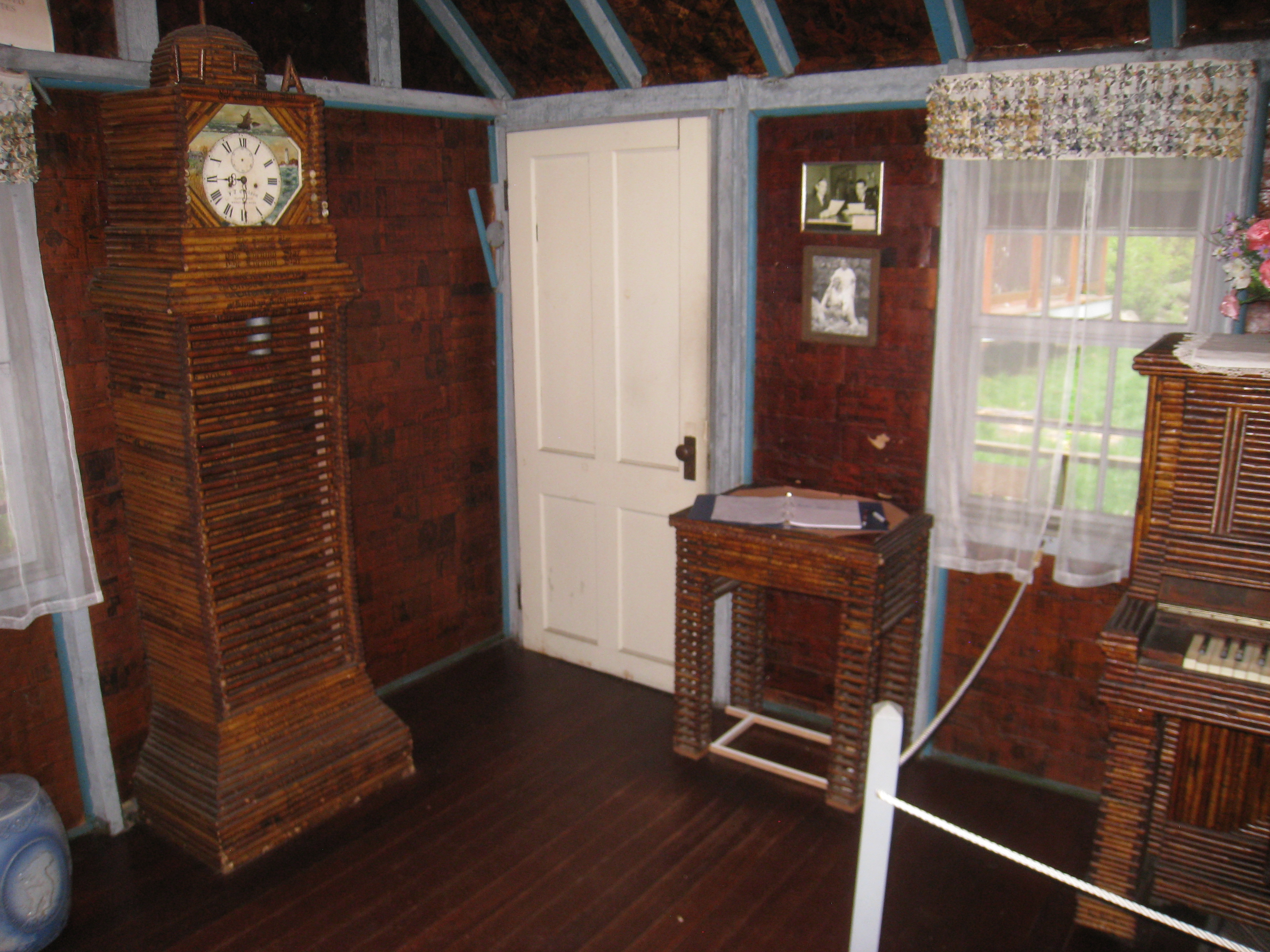
The clock

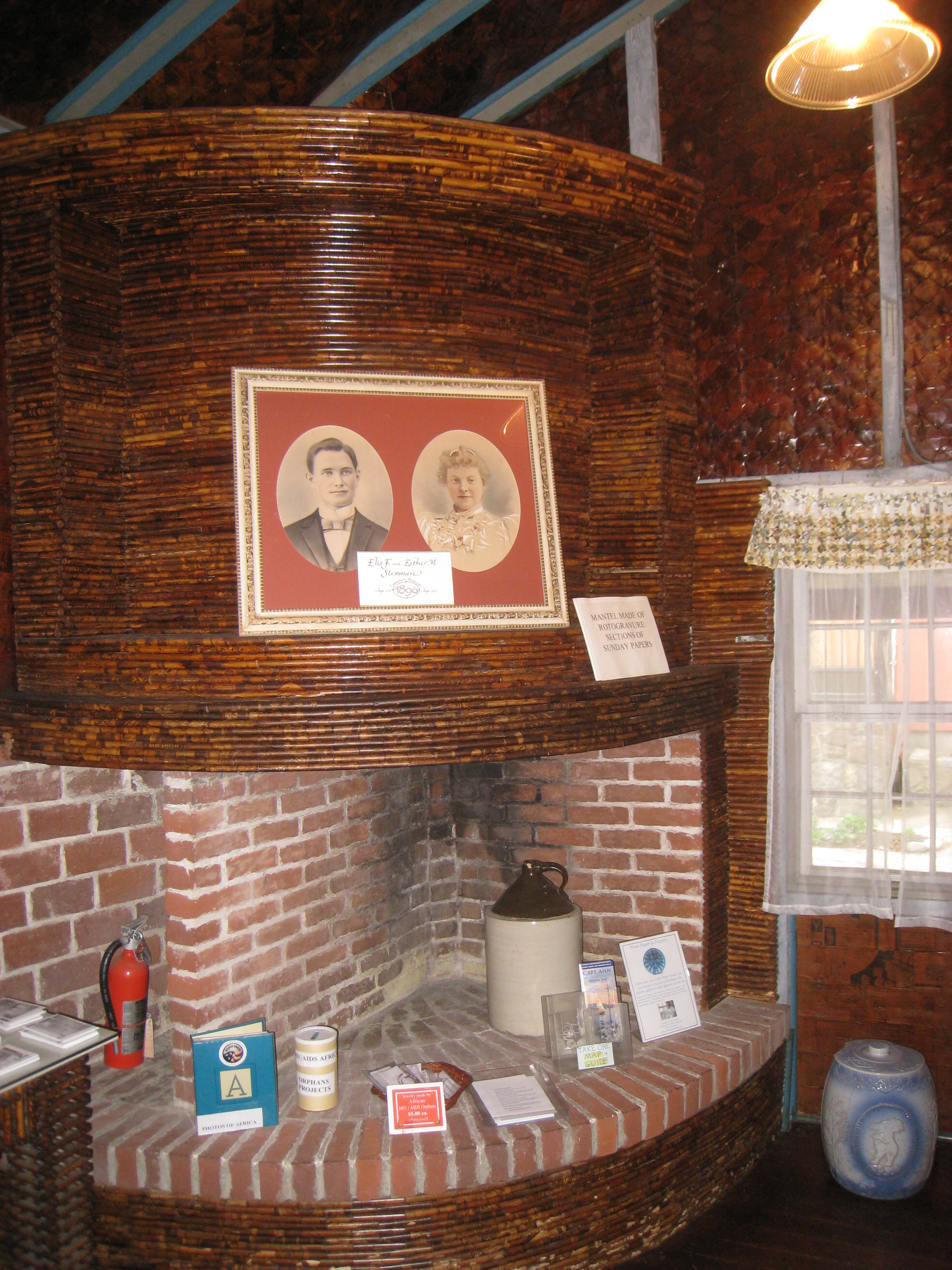
Fireplace

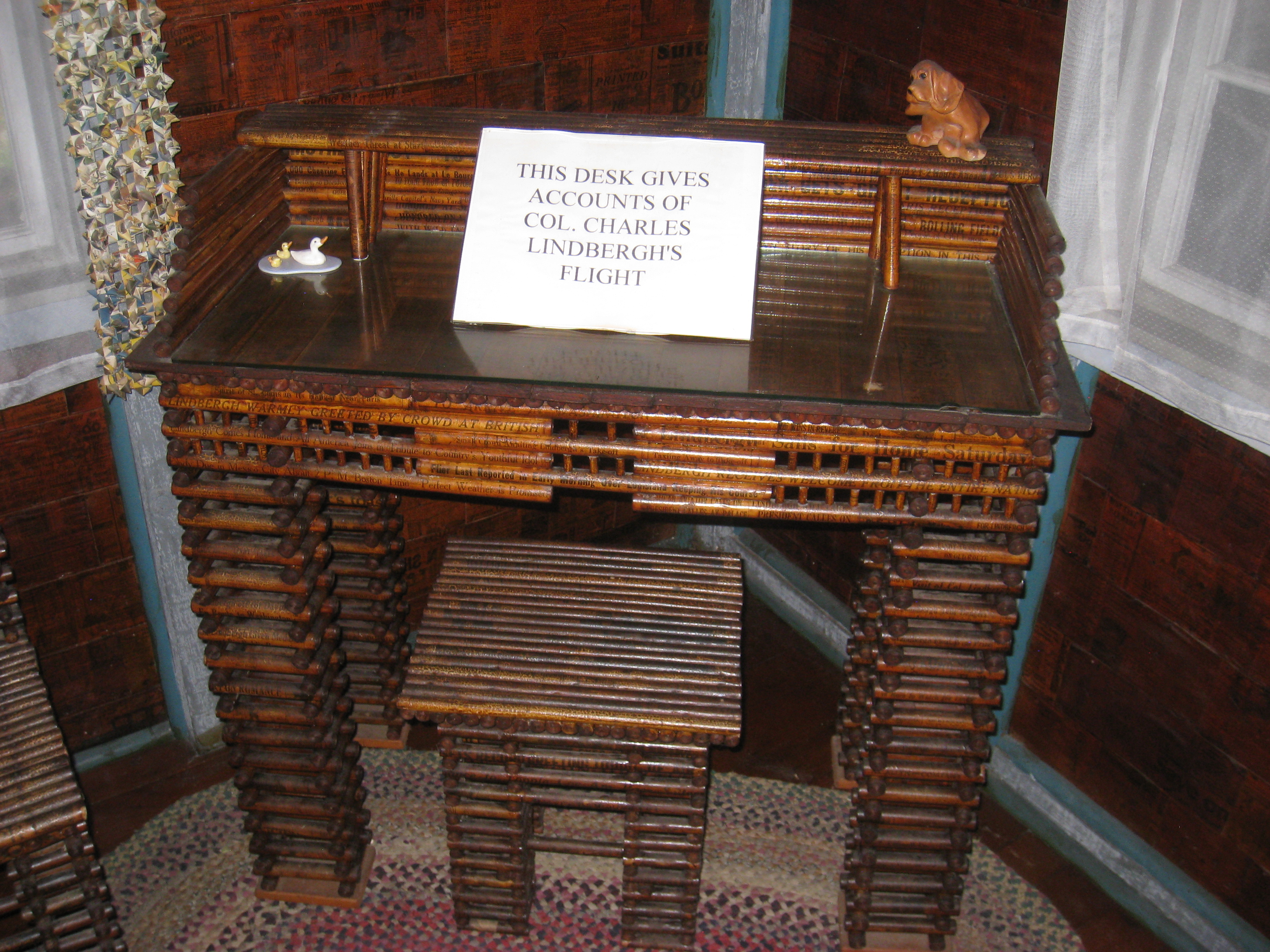
The Lindbergh desk
