= Thacher Island =

Island in Essex County, Massachusetts, United States

Coordinates: 42°38′15″N 70°34′43″W

Aerial view of Thacher Island in 2026

Thacher Island is a small island off Cape Ann on the Massachusetts coast in the United States. It is a part of the Town of Rockport. It was a place where some naval confrontations, both minor and major, took place, which helped secure a victory for the colonists.

== History ==
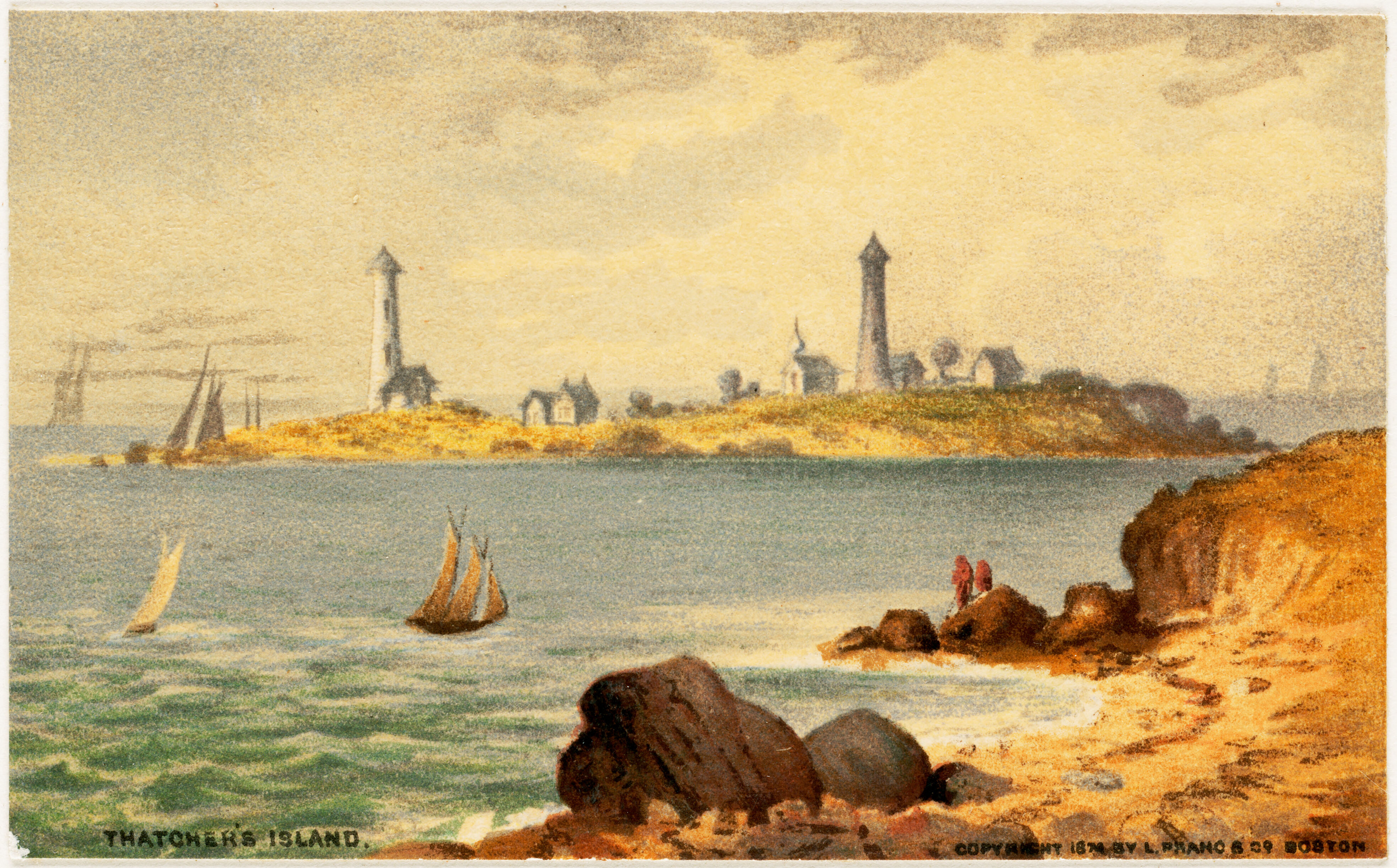
Thatcher's Island, (c) 1874; from the Louis Prang & Company Collection of the Boston Public Library

The island is named for Anthony Thacher and his wife, who survived the sinking of the barque Watch and Wait in the Great Colonial Hurricane of 1635 by reaching it. It is located in perilous waters, where there have been many shipwrecks. With the large number of shipwrecks around this area, there was a petition sent from sea captains to erect a light on the island. On April 22, 1771, the provincial government authorized construction of two lighthouses on the island. The lights went on December 21, 1771.

Although these lights were valuable assistance for the fishermen and sailors of the sea, there was a strong feeling among the townspeople that the lighthouse was helping the British fleet more than it was helping the Patriot cause. This feeling increased after hostilities erupted with the Battles of Lexington and Concord and the Battle of Bunker Hill. Early in July 1775, Dr. Samuel Rogers of Gloucester led his company of minutemen to the island. There they destroyed the lights, and brought the keeper, one Captain Kirkwood, his family, and his assistants back to the mainland.

Both lights were rebuilt and lit in 1861. They are located 900 feet (270 m) apart and are 124 feet (38 m) high.

In 1967, Joseph Barboza spent a notable period on Thacher Island as part of the Witness Protection Program.

The Thacher Island National Wildlife Refuge occupies the northern part of the island.

== Film ==
A film adaptation of Casey Sherman's 2013 bestselling book "Animal" was announced in August 2018, with the title Thacher Island. It is being developed by Fox 2000 and produced by Berlanti Productions. The writing team behind the film BlacKkKlansman, David Rabinowitz and Charlie Wachtel, has been hired to pen the adaptation.

The film will tell the story of notorious Boston hitman Joe Barboza, who agreed to testify against the New England mob in 1967, becoming the first person in American history to be put into a witness protection program. As part of the program, Barboza and his family were transported to Thacher Island, where they would be stationed under the protection of US marshals until the date of the trial.

== Play ==
The 'dramatic play-in-progress' Thacher Island, which was set on the island itself, premiered on November 12, 2023, at Vulture Fest. Written by Chelsea Peretti, it followed a mother marooned on the island for 15 years (played by Peretti), her son William (John Early), a mysterious stranger named Vagina Jenkins,(Kaitlin Olsen), and Margaret, an enterprising seafarer (Xosha Roquemore). The stage directions were read by Deanna Barillari.

Themes of the play included dreams, goals, love, resentment, adulation, bitterness, jealousy, addiction, desire, intimacy, and boating.

At the premiere, Peretti announced she was able to perform the play after being selected from out of more than 8000 playwrights as winner of Vulture's Playwright's Horizons Program. She was funded by several grants to perform the play, including the Cherry Lane Theater Pop Cherry Perfect New Playwright Grant, The Netflix and Chill-sea Peretti Grant and a second Yale School of Drama honorary degree.
