= Rockport, Massachusetts =

- Town
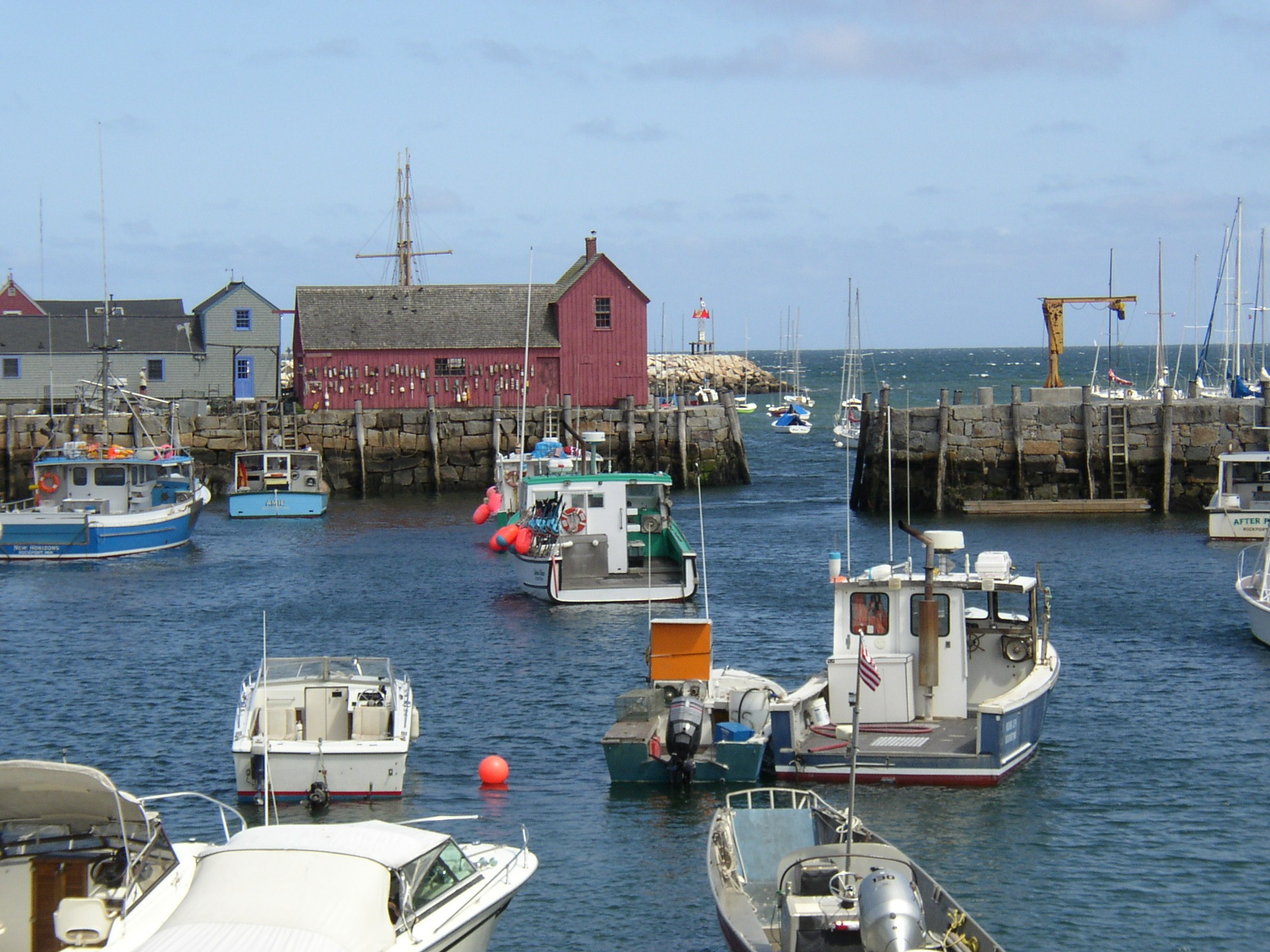
- Rockport inner harbor showing lobster fleet and Motif #1 (red building)

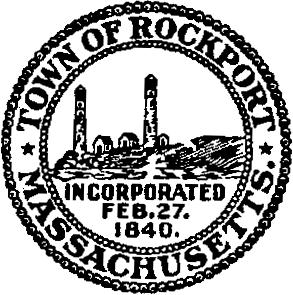
- Seal
- Motto: "A Seacoast Village on Cape Ann"
- Location in Essex County and the state of Massachusetts.
- Coordinates: 42°39′20″N 70°37′15″W
- Country: United States
- State: Massachusetts
- County: Essex
- Incorporated: February 27, 1840

Government
  - Type: Open town meeting

Area
  - Total: 17.5 sq mi (45.4 km^{2})
  - Land: 7.0 sq mi (18.1 km^{2})
  - Water: 10.5 sq mi (27.3 km^{2})
- Elevation: 75 ft (23 m)

Population (2020)
  - Total: 6,992
  - Density: 1,000/sq mi (386/km^{2})
- Time zone: UTC-5 (Eastern)
  - Summer (DST): UTC-4 (Eastern)
- ZIP code: 01966
- Area code: 351 / 978
- FIPS code: 25-57880
- GNIS feature ID: 0618308
- Website: Town of Rockport, Massachusetts, Official Web Site

Rockport is a seaside town in Essex County, Massachusetts, United States. The population was 6,992 in 2020. Rockport is about 40 miles (64 km) northeast of Boston, at the tip of Cape Ann. It borders Gloucester to its west, and is surrounded by the Atlantic Ocean in all other directions. Part of the town comprises the census-designated place of Rockport.

== History ==
Before English explorers and colonists arrived, Cape Ann was home to a number of Native American villages, inhabited by members of the Agawam tribe. Samuel de Champlain named the peninsula "Cap Aux Isles" in 1605, and his expedition may have landed there briefly. Europeans founded a permanent settlement at nearby Gloucester in 1623.

Richard Tarr, a granite cutter and the first settler of the Sandy Bay Colony, lived in the area that is now Rockport in 1680. He and his wife, Elizabeth, had ten children, of whom those born after 1690 were recorded in the Sandy Bay Colony record books. Richard died around 1732.

The area provided timber for shipbuilding, especially pine, and granite was extracted from the Sandy Bay quarries. The Cape Ann area provided one of the richest fishing grounds in New England and in 1743 a dock was built at Rockport harbor on Sandy Bay that was used for both timber export and fishing. By the beginning of the 19th century, the first granite quarries were developed, and by the 1830s Rockport granite was being shipped to cities and towns throughout the east coast of the United States.

On September 8, 1814, during the War of 1812, the British frigate HMS Nymphe, on duty blockading New England, sailed into Sandy Bay off of Rockport. The ship sent out two barges, one of which captured the fort at Long Cove, while the other was sighted by locals at daybreak as it came around Bearskin Neck. The bell of the Congregational Church was sounded to warn the residents of the British invasion. An exchange of musket fire ensued between the barge's crew and the community's "Seafencibles", with no injuries on either side. The barge took aim at the church's bell to silence it, but the cannonball hit the steeple and became embedded in the structure. Local legend has it that the cannon's recoil caused it to punch a hole in the barge, which sank. Sailors on board came ashore and some were captured.

The church removed the ball, replacing it with a replica, which can still be seen on the steeple. The actual cannonball ball is taken out of storage for special occasions.

Rockport had consisted primarily of large estates, summer homes, and a small fishing village, while Gloucester was becoming increasingly urbanized. Rockport was set off as a separate town as its residents desired a separate enclave with an identity of its own, and it was incorporated in 1840. As the demand for its high-grade granite grew during the Industrial Revolution, Rockport's quarries became a major source of the stone. A distinctive form of sloop was even developed to transport the granite to parts far and wide until the 1910s. For many years, there were many residents of Scandinavian descent, dating from the days when Finnish and Swedish immigrants with stone-working expertise made up a large part of the workforce at the quarries.

Although the demand for granite decreased with the increased use of concrete in construction during the Great Depression, Rockport still thrived as an artists' colony—which began years earlier due in part to its popularity as a vacation spot known for its rocky, boulder-strewn ocean beaches, its history as a prominent fishing harbor, and its mentions in books such as Rudyard Kipling's Captains Courageous.

In 1856, a group of 200 women led by Hannah Jumper came through the town, destroying anything containing alcohol in "Rockport's revolt against rum". Alcohol was then banned. Except for a period in the 1930s, Rockport remained one of 15 Massachusetts dry towns, remaining dry until 2005, when alcohol was allowed to be served at restaurants. Sales at stores were not allowed until 2019, when a market was granted a liquor license and began to sell beer and wine.

=== The labor movement in Rockport quarries ===
Rockport, especially the Pigeon Cove area, has historically been home to many immigrant communities, notably Finns, Swedes, Italians, and Portuguese. Scandinavian immigrants often worked in the quarries at what is now Halibut Point State Park. Mediterranean immigrants arrived in the Early Republic, and the first Finnish and Swedish immigrants in the 1870s. Finns and Swedes were often lumped together as one group—as historian Jonathan Schwartz suggests, "a generalized 'Scandinavian' identity for the Swedish and Finnish immigrants, at least in the eyes of the New England community". These ethnic divisions were important pieces of working-class identities, and became more important as quarry workers become more involved in labor activism against the Rockport Granite Company, which opened in 1865 and dissolved in 1933.

From March to June 1899, for example, a group of Finnish quarrymen, who were the newest immigrant groups brought in to work in the quarries, went on strike. Originally, Finns were brought to Pigeon Cove and the Rockport Granite quarries to break strikes in the early 1890s, but they eventually became one of the most militant groups to fight for workers' rights. The 1899 strike was supported by the National Granite Cutters Union and the Quarry Workers Union, allegedly due to contract violations. This strike was particularly heated, with violence and arrests throughout. The Boston Globe published many reports of the Finns being particularly strong labor activists, refusing to cut deals and threatening those who tried to go to work during the strikes.

The Rockport Granite Company attempted to bring in Italian laborers from Boston to act as strikebreakers in the spring of 1899. These temporary workers were housed in shanties near Blood Ledge quarry at Bay View, about half a mile from the quarry. The Finns heard about the Italians and attempted to communicate that they were on strike, hoping the Italians would join their cause. According to The New York Times, the Italians had been brought to the quarry "under false pretenses" and about half of them abandoned work. Those who remained felt threatened and the Rockport Granite Company requested police protection for them.

On May 10, 1899, several Finnish strikers were arrested for their activism. On April 20, 1899, a group of 200 Finns rallied and worked its way to the quarry shanties, armed with clubs and stones, eventually converging on the Italians, who had taken refuge in the boiler house, even going so far as to pull the shutters off the building. Eventually, the strikers dispersed when one member was shot in the foot. The Italians were quite afraid of the Finnish strikers, and many of them returned to Boston after this incident.

On June 8, 1899, a bombing, suspected by police to be the work of strikers or someone invested in the strike, destroyed one of the company buildings inhabited by a John Nelson and six other workers who refused to join the strike. The workers were not injured. Three Finns were arrested on suspicion of the crime. They later fled Rockport to avoid trial.

Eventually, the Finns and their fellow strikers won the right to a nine-hour work day and time-and-a-half for overtime work, and assurances that the company would not discriminate against any of the over 2,000 workers who participated in the strike. During the early 20th century, quarry workers struck for other rights with the support of their unions, notably in 1902, 1908, and 1916. The quarries closed during the Great Depression. Two explanations are possible for the closures—the introduction of new building materials such as poured concrete and quarry workers' continued movement for higher wages into the 1920s. Swedes and Finns worked in the quarries until they closed and left a mark on Rockport's culture.

=== Motif Number 1 ===
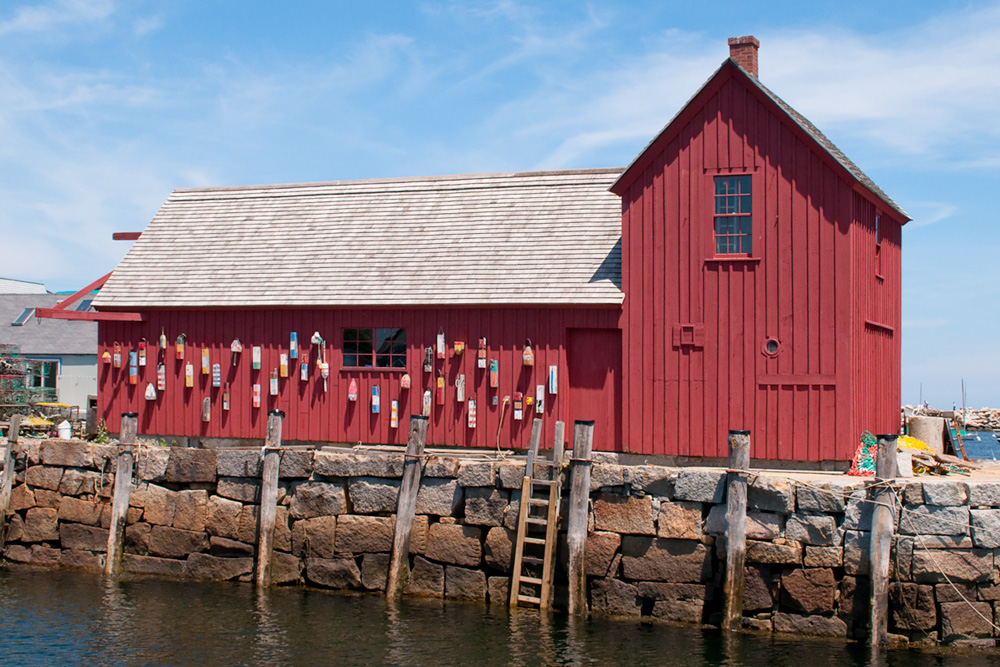
Motif Number 1

A red fishing shack on Bradley Wharf in Rockport, known as "Motif Number 1", has for years been one of Cape Ann's most famous sites. It is the subject of hundreds of paintings and photographs, and is visited by aspiring artists and tourists from all over the world. The original structure was built in 1884 and destroyed in the Blizzard of 1978, but an exact replica was constructed that same year.

In 1933, the Rockport American Legion Post. No. 98 built a 27-foot (8.2 m) scale model of "Motif No.1" for the Legion Parade, which was held in Chicago, Illinois, site of the 1933 World's Fair. Designed by Aldro Hibbard and Anthony Thieme, with participation by the RAA, Board of Trade and townspeople "from high to low", the float was commissioned in June, completed by the end of September, and driven in daylight only, from Rockport to Chicago, in less than a week. On October 3, 1933, among 200 floats, it won first place in the float competition. Upon the float's return to Rockport, a crowd of over 4,000 lined the Great Hill (5 Corners) to welcome the float home.

=== Modern Rockport ===
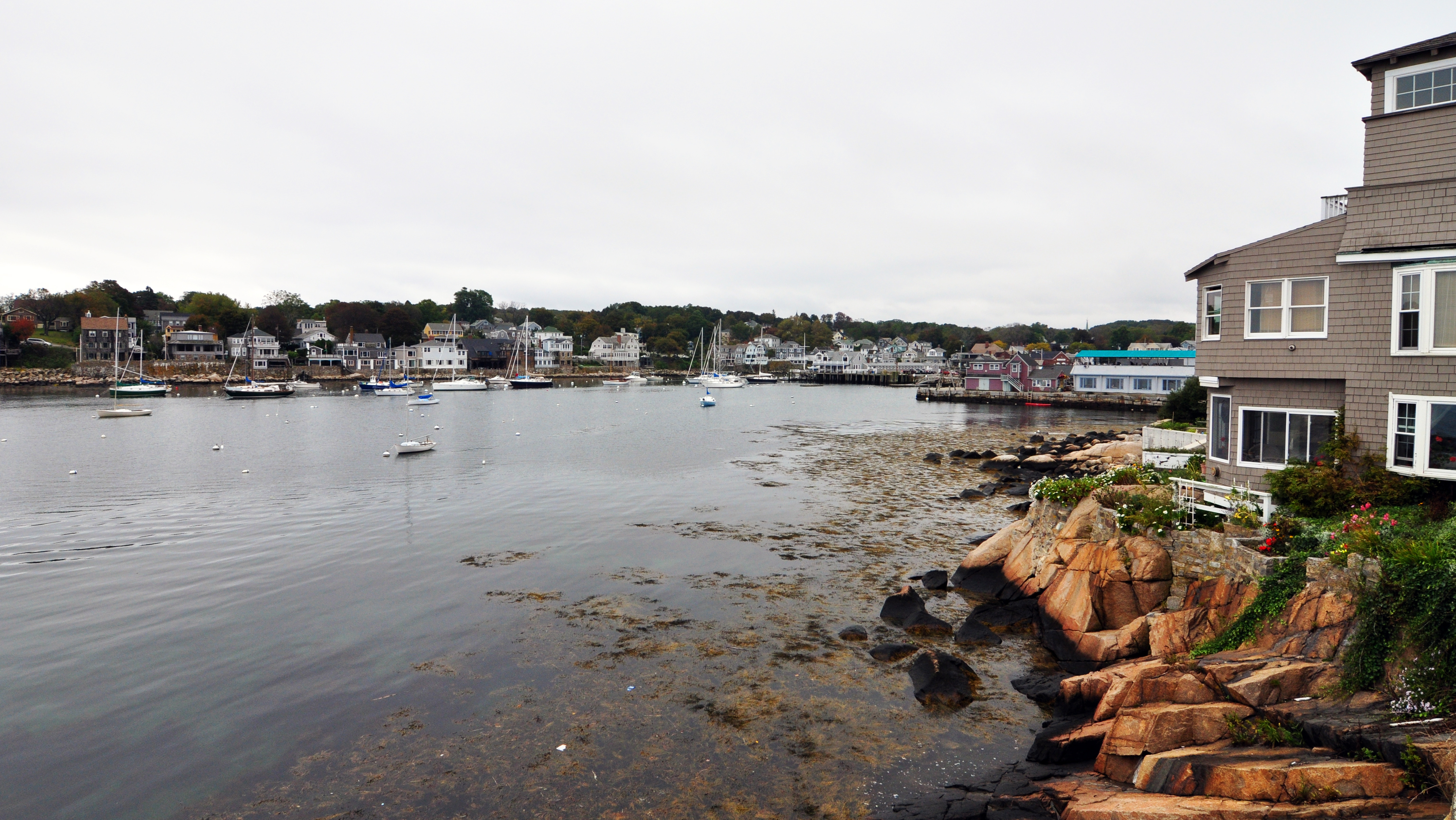
Rockport, 2009

Today Rockport is primarily a suburban residential and tourist town, but it is still home to a number of lobster fishermen and artists. Its rocky beaches and seaside parks are a favorite place for tourists from the Greater Boston Area and Rhode Island, among other places.

== Geography ==
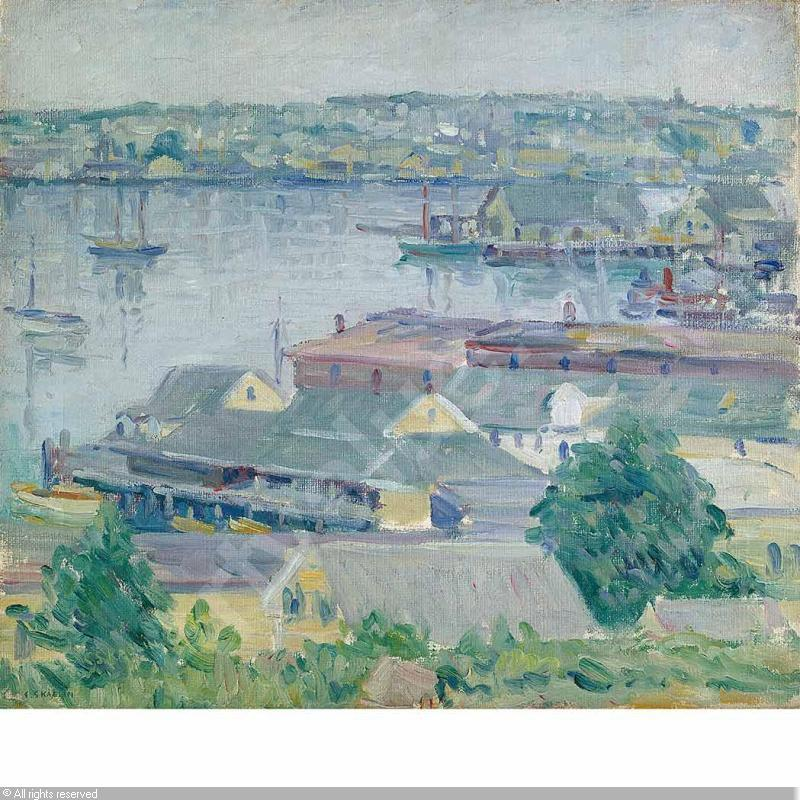
Charles S. Kaelin. "Rockport Harbor, MA"

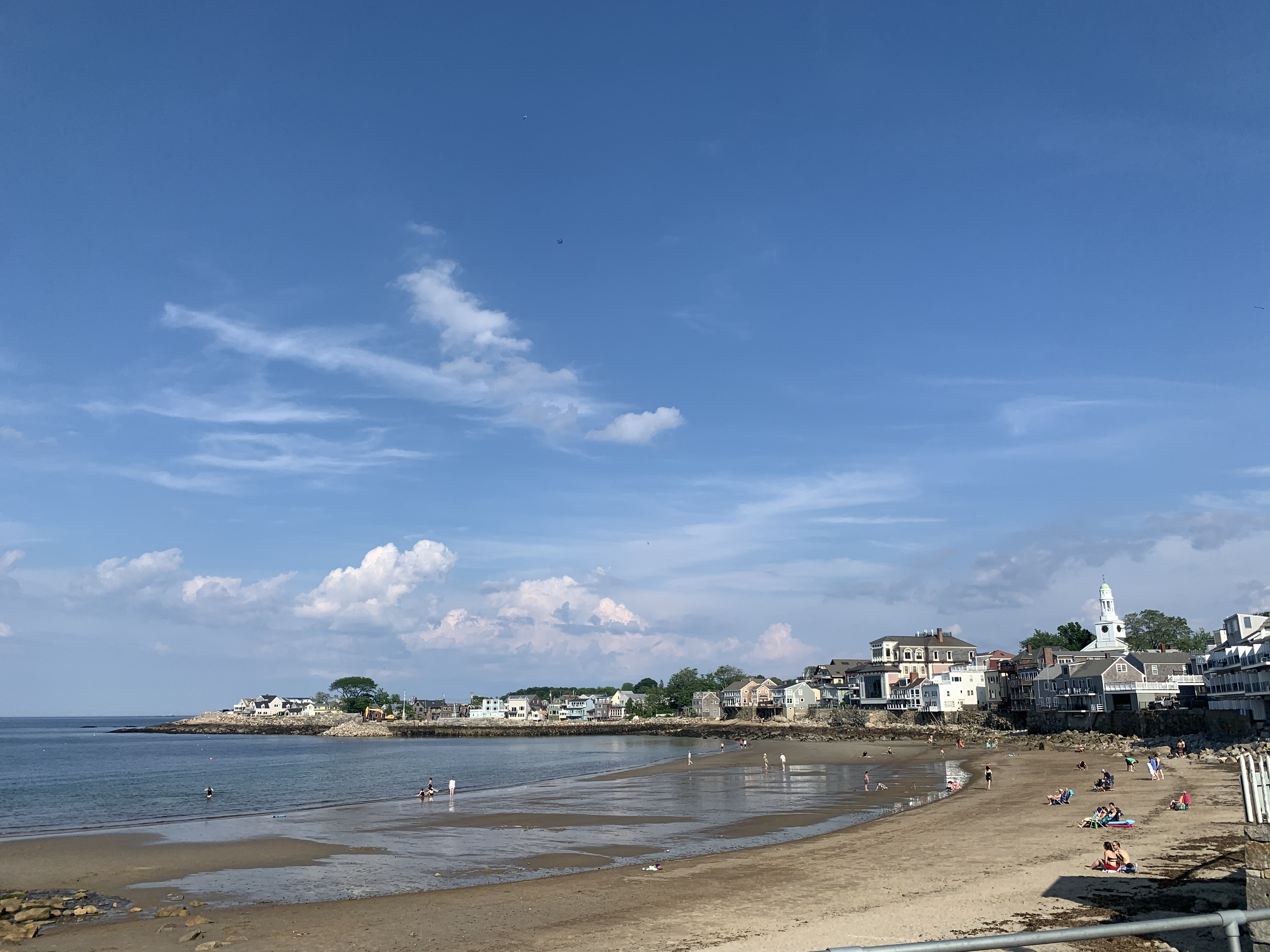
Front Beach in Rockport

The town has an area of 17.5 square miles (45.4 km^{2}), of which 7.0 square miles (18.1 km^{2}) is land and 10.5 square miles (27.3 km^{2}), or 60.14%, is water. Rockport lies at the far eastern end of Cape Ann and is surrounded on three sides by water. There are three islands, Straitsmouth Island, Thacher Island, and Milk Island, which lie off the coast of Rockport and are part of the town. The town's shore is mostly rocky north of Lands End, but somewhat less so south of there, as three of the town's six beaches are on this 1-1/4-mile stretch of shoreline. Rockport Harbor and Old Harbor, both near the center of town, provide deeper water in which boats may dock, which provides ocean access to the fishing community. The town's highest point is atop Pool Hill, which is surrounded by forest. The town's other protected areas include Halibut Point State Park & Reservation, the Thacher Island National Wildlife Refuge, and the Knight Wildlife Reservation on Milk Island, as well as a smaller area just south of Halibut Point run by the Massachusetts Audubon Society.

Rockport's only neighboring town is Gloucester. Rockport is about 20 miles (32 km) east-northeast of Salem and 35 miles (56 km) northeast of Boston. There are no highways in town but two state routes, Route 127 and Route 127A, pass through. Route 127 passes from north to south, entering inland from Gloucester and passing over Great Hill before following the sea from Back Harbor to Halibut Point and back. Route 127A follows the southern coast, looping around Lands End, Gap Head, and downtown before reaching its northern terminus at Route 127.

Bus service in Rockport is provided by the Cape Ann Transportation Authority. Rockport is the last station on its eponymous branch of the Newburyport/Rockport Line of the MBTA Commuter Rail, providing service along the North Shore to Boston's North Station. The nearest airport is Beverly Regional Airport, with the nearest national and international service at Boston's Logan International Airport.

== Demographics ==
Historical population
Year	Pop.	±%
1840	2,650	—
1850	3,274	+23.5%
1860	3,237	−1.1%
1870	3,904	+20.6%
1880	3,912	+0.2%
1890	4,087	+4.5%
1900	4,592	+12.4%
1910	4,211	−8.3%
1920	3,878	−7.9%
1930	3,630	−6.4%
1940	3,556	−2.0%
1950	4,231	+19.0%
1960	4,616	+9.1%
1970	5,636	+22.1%
1980	6,345	+12.6%
1990	7,482	+17.9%
2000	7,767	+3.8%
2010	6,952	−10.5%
2020	6,992	+0.6%
2022*	6,925	−1.0%
* = population estimate. Source: United States census records and Population Estimates Program data.

As of the census of 2000, there were 7,767 people, 3,490 households, and 2,027 families residing in the town. The population density was 1,098.9 inhabitants per square mile (424.3/km^{2}). There were 4,202 housing units at an average density of 229.5 persons/km^{2} (594.5 persons/sq mi). The racial makeup of the town was 97.73% (7,590) White, 0.27% (20) African American, 0.22% (17) Native American, 0.45% (34) Asian, 0.03% (2) Pacific Islander, 0.51% from other races, and 0.79% (69) from two or more races. 1.07% (83) of the population was Hispanic or Latino of any race.

The ancestral breakdown of the residents is as follows: English (23.0%), Irish (20.4%), Italian (15.8%), German (7.1%), Scots (5.7%). The percentage of residents born outside of the United States is 6.3% (3.7% in Europe, 1.1% elsewhere in North America, 1.0% in Asia).

There were 3,490 households, out of which 24.4% had children under the age of 18 living with them, 48.0% were married couples living together, 7.6% had a woman whose husband did not live with her, and 41.9% were non-families. 36.3% of all households were made up of individuals, and 16.6% had someone living alone who was 65 years of age or older. The average household size was 2.20 and the average family size was 2.93.

In the town, the population was spread out, with 21.3% under the age of 18, 4.4% from 18 to 24, 24.5% from 25 to 44, 29.6% from 45 to 64, and 20.2% who were 65 years of age or older. The median age was 45 years. For every 100 females, there were 85.3 males. For every 100 females age 18 and over, there were 79.9 males.

The median income for a household in the town was $50,661, and the median income for a family was $69,263. Males had a median income of $46,131 versus $36,458 for females. The per capita income was $29,294. 3.7% of the population and 2.5% of families were below the poverty line. Of people living in poverty, 3.0% were under 18 and 3.5% are 65 or older. The median house value was $277,300.

== Public safety ==
The Rockport Fire Department and Rockport Ambulance both serve the community as an on-call volunteer fire department. They are dispatched through the police department and respond to the Central fire station on Broadway or the Pigeon Cove fire station on Granite Street. The waters are patrolled by the Rockport Harbormaster on T-Wharf, who operate a 24' Boston Whaler Justice and a 22' Boston Whaler. The Rockport Police Department, at 168 Main Street, operates three patrol shifts composed of 18 full-time officers.

== Arts and culture ==
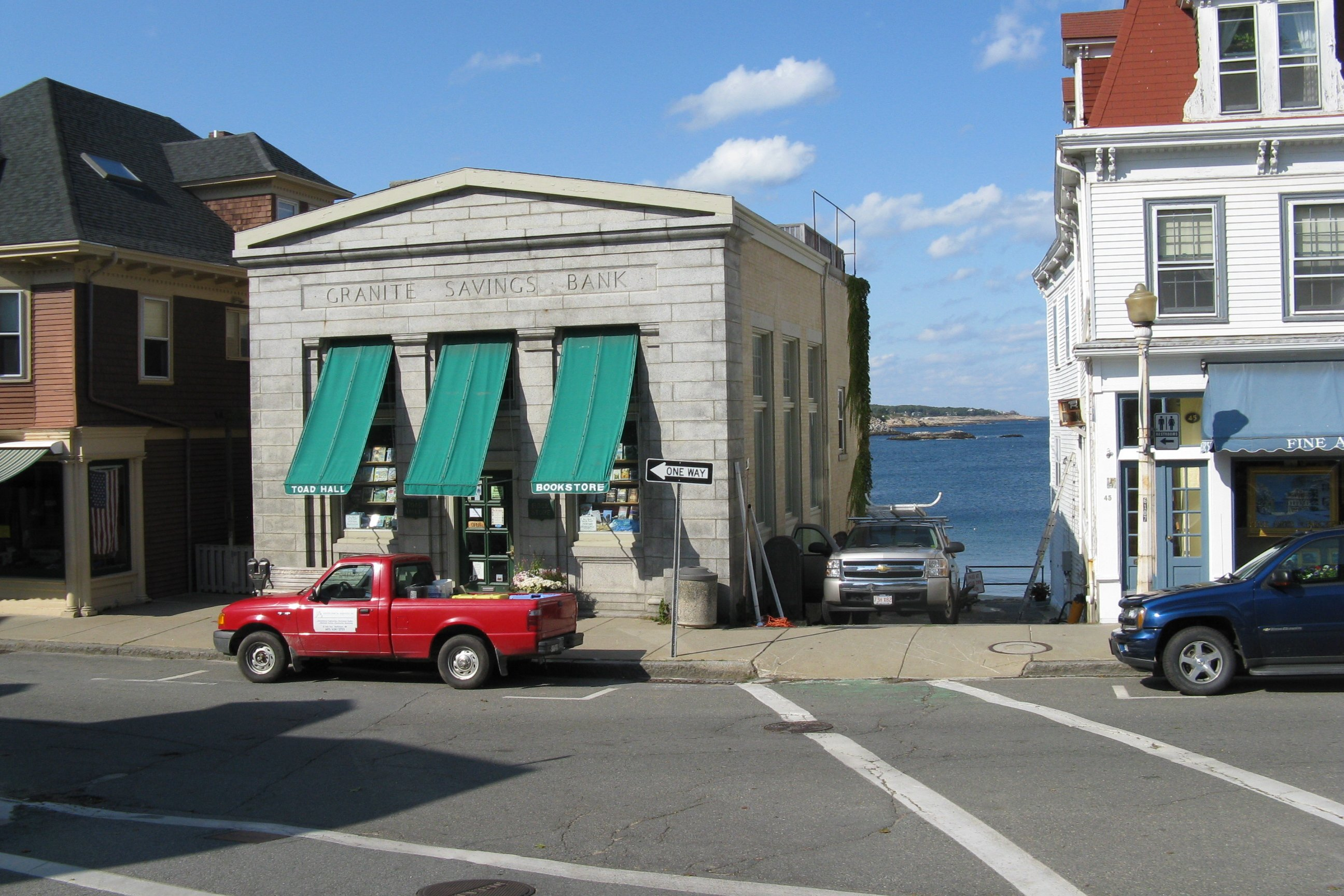
Toad Hall Bookstore (closed in 2017, now a private residence) in the former Granite Savings Bank building (1926)

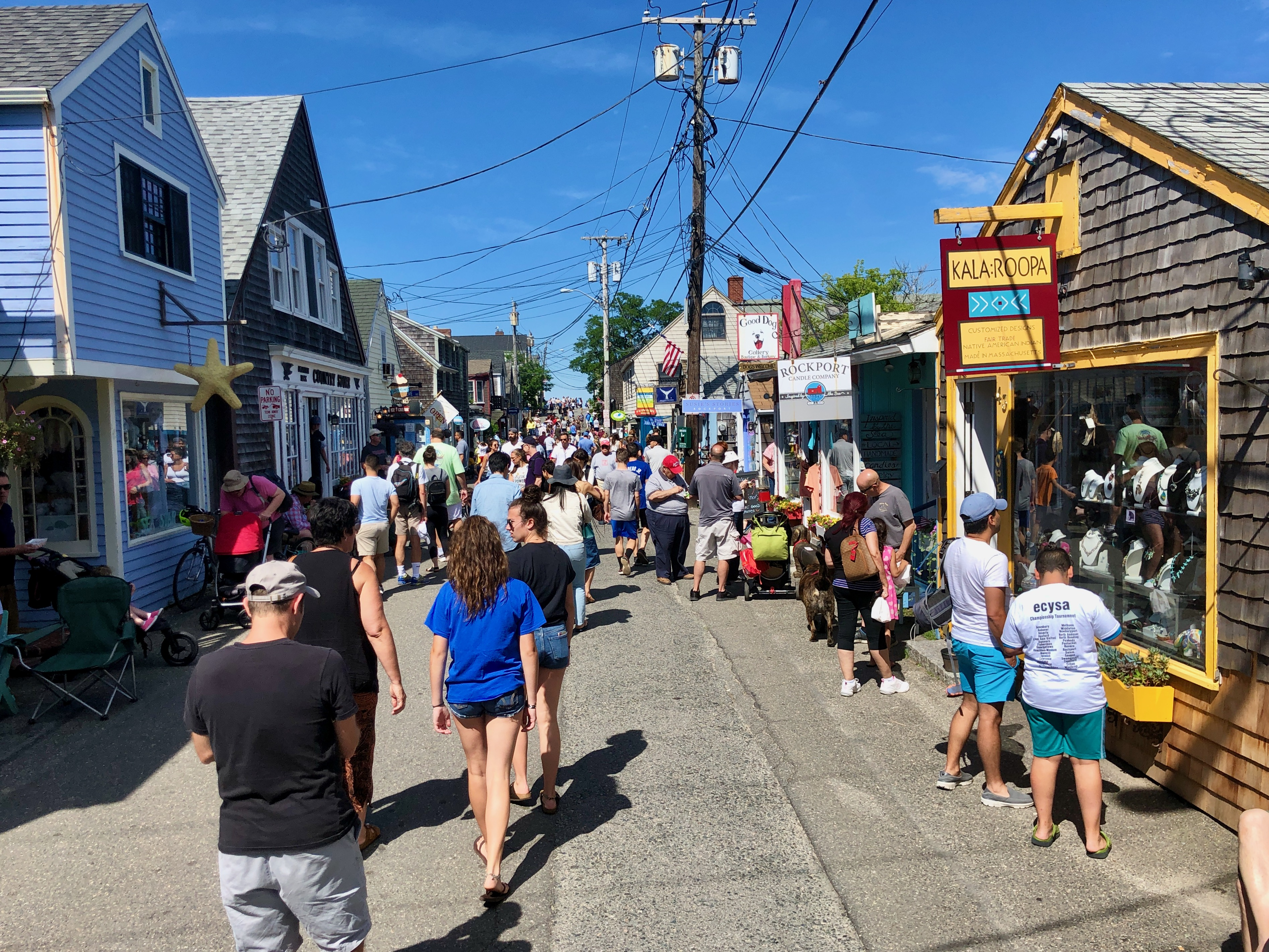
Bearskin Neck shops

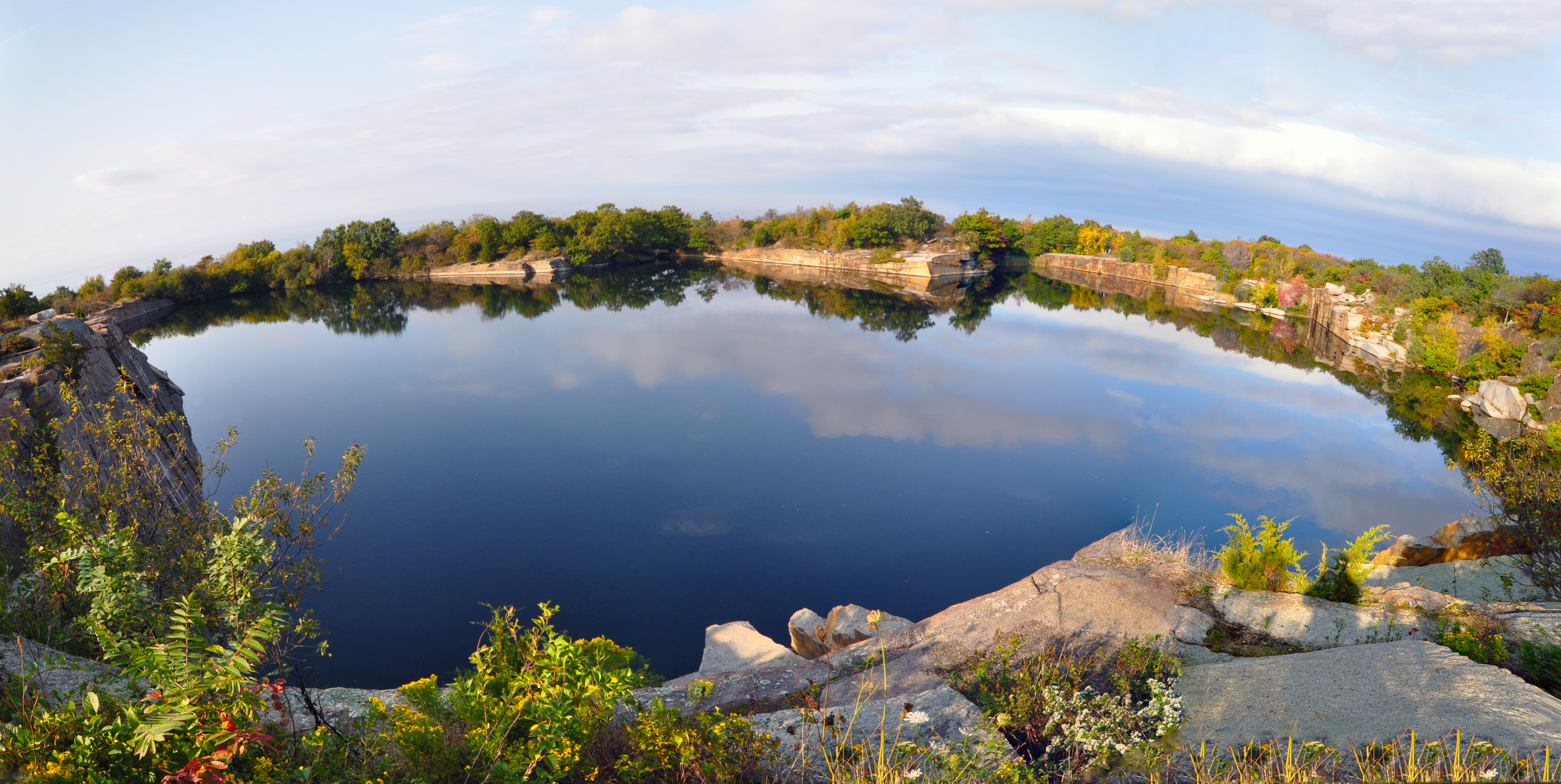
Babson Farm granite quarry, Halibut Point State Park

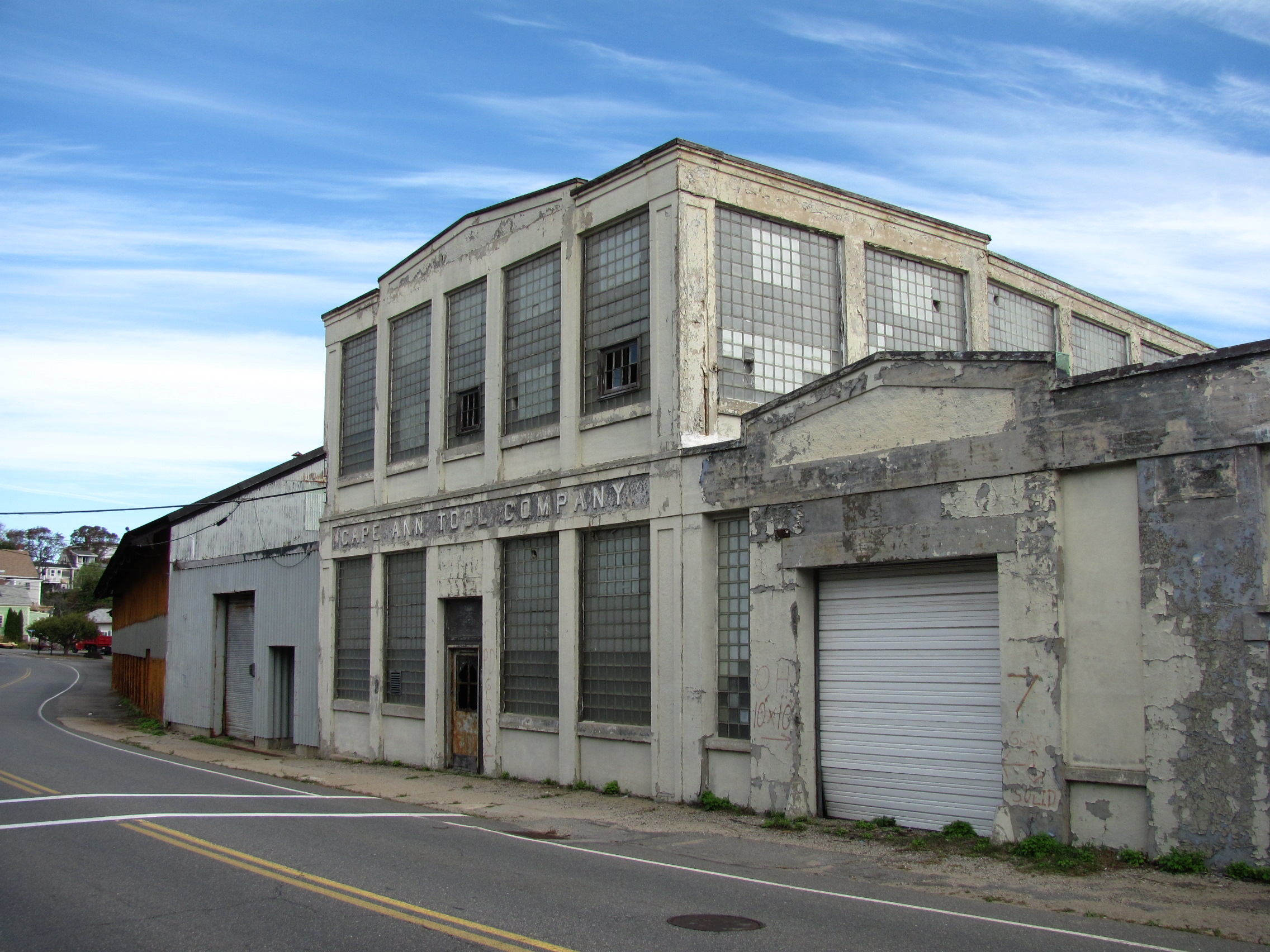
The old Cape Ann Tool Company

Places and organizations with artistic or cultural notability include:

- Bearskin Neck, a short street of old fishermen and lobstermen shacks now restaurants, shops and galleries.
- Dogtown Common, an abandoned inland settlement on Cape Ann which is now protected in perpetuity.
- Halibut Point Reservation, a nature reserve managed by The Trustees of Reservations and the Massachusetts Department of Conservation and Recreation.
- The Paper House, a house, including furnishings, made of wood and around 100,000 recycled newspapers at 52 Pigeon Hill Street.
- Rockport Art Association; founded in 1921, the RAA is one of the oldest and most active art organizations in the country.
- Thacher's Island, an island off Rockport which has twin lighthouses
- Rockport Music, Shalin Liu Performance Center is a state of the art performing arts facility.

== Infrastructure ==
=== Transportation ===
Rockport is served by thirteen weekday commuter trains to Boston as one terminus of the MBTA Newburyport/Rockport Line.

Bus transit throughout the area is provided by the Cape Ann Transportation Authority.

== Notable people ==
- Kevin Baker, author
- William Rose Benet, poet
- Nelson Bragg, percussionist and vocalist for Brian Wilson Band
- William Slater Brown, novelist
- Paula Cole, Grammy Award-winning singer/songwriter
- Otis Cook, painter
- Marjorie Flack, children's book author and illustrator
- Bobbi Gibb, first woman to have run the entire Boston Marathon
- William Francis Gibbs, naval architect
- Rick Hautala, author
- Bobby Hebb, songwriter and singer
- David Robinson, drummer for The Cars and the Modern Lovers
- Julian Soshnick, civil rights lawyer
- Andrew Stanton, writer and director for Pixar
- Vermin Supreme, performance artist and perennial independent US presidential candidate
- Helen Van Wyk, artist, author and PBS television host
- Anna Zerilli, football player

== Films set or filmed in Rockport ==
- Harbourmaster, 1957–1958 adventure/drama television series, starring Barry Sullivan; set in Lockport
- Coma (1978)
- I'll Be Home for Christmas (1988)
- Mermaids (1990)
- The Good Son (1993)
- The Next Karate Kid (1994)
- The Love Letter (1999)
- Stuck on You (2003)
- The Proposal (2009; standing in for Sitka, Alaska)
- Edge of Darkness (2010)
- Manchester by the Sea (2016)
- Chappaquiddick (2017)
- CODA (2021)
- Widow's Bay (2026 television series)

== See also ==
- Cape Ann
- Long Beach (Rockport)
- Edwin Hubbell Chapin
- Dogtown, Massachusetts
- Halibut Point Reservation
- Rockport Art Association
- Rockport Music
- Seaside resort
- Thacher Island
- Twin Lights Soda
