= George Loftus Noyes =

Canadian-American painter

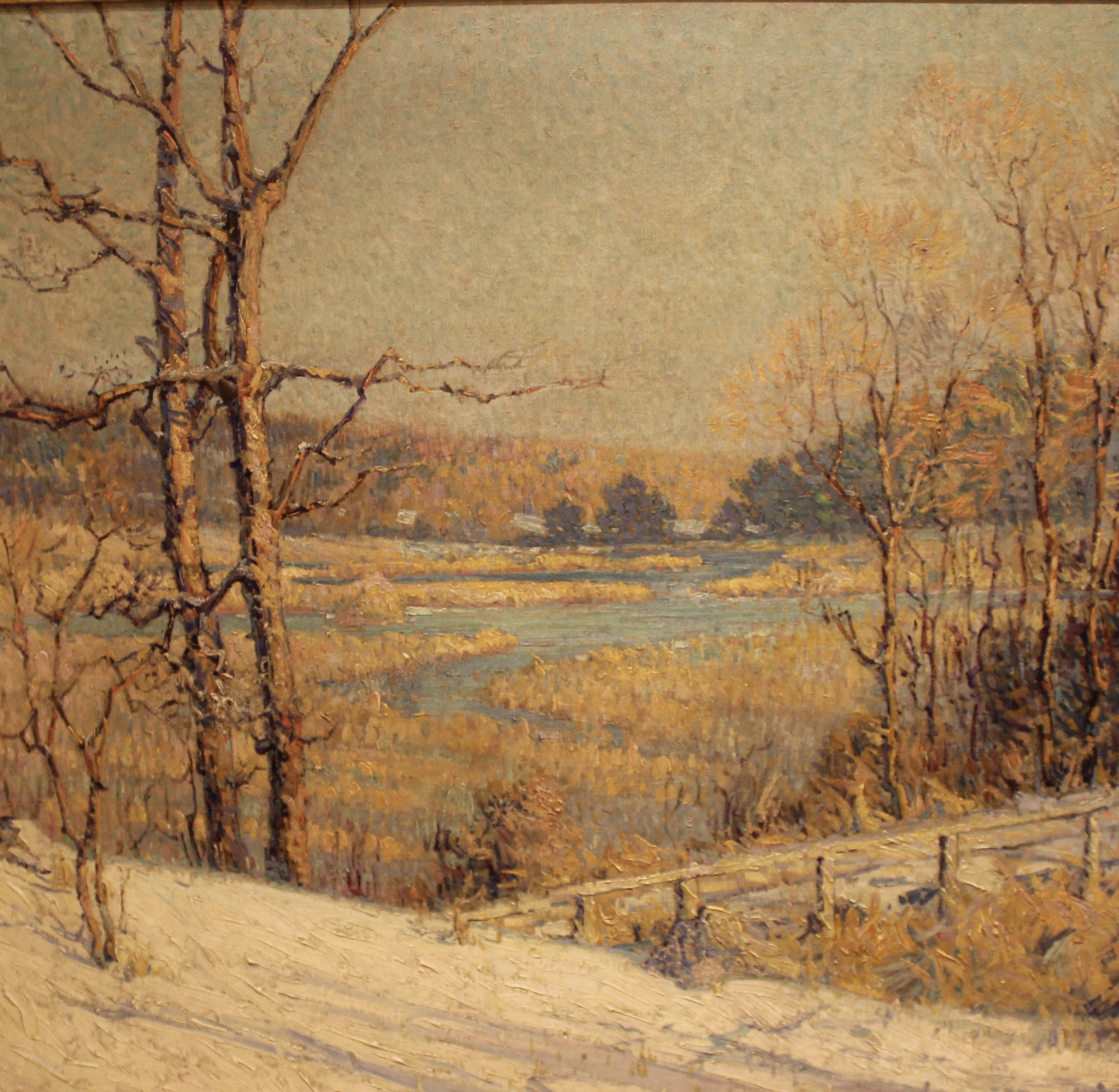
Meadows in Winter, from the Widener University Art Museum Alfred O. Deshong Collection

George Loftus Noyes (1864–1951) was a Canadian-born American painter and teacher, who gained fame in the early 20th century as an American Impressionist.

== Life and career ==
Noyes was born in 1864, in Bothwell, Canada West. Noyes' parents were both American citizens. He was a prominent member of the Boston School of American Impressionism.

He studied at the Massachusetts Normal School with George Bartlett in the early 1880s and in Paris, France, at the Académie Colarossi between 1890 and 1893. Painter Jean Andre Rixens influenced Noyes to a huge degree, particularly his still life painting.

He was a highly respected landscape and still life painter in Boston in the early 1900s. Noyes exhibited at the Pennsylvania Academy of Fine Arts, the Art Institute of Chicago and the Corcoran Gallery in Washington, D.C. He was a member of several Art associations, including the North Shore Art Association, the Boston Art Society, and the Guild of Boston Artists.

In 1901, Noyes taught during the summer in Annisquam, Massachusetts, and became an early teacher to Newell Convers Wyeth, father of Andrew Wyeth and grandfather to Jamie Wyeth. N.C Wyeth also studied with Noyes in 1921, saying "His color knowledge is superb and I think he will give me much help at this juncture".

He primarily worked and painted at the Fenway Studios on 30 Ipswich Street in Boston. Other prominent Boston artists working at the Fenway Studios in that period include Marion Boyd Allen, Lilla Cabot Perry, Joseph Decamp, Philip Hale, Lilian Westcott Hale, Charles Hopkinson, György Kepes, William Kaula, Lee Lufkin Kaula, Lillian and Leslie Prince Thompson, William McGregor Paxton, Marion L. Pooke, Edmund Charles Tarbell, and Mary Bradish Titcomb.

A barn fire in 1939 was to destroy literally hundreds of his works, plunging Noyes into a deep depression at the age of 75. He died in 1951, in Peterborough, New Hampshire. His prominence faded after his death, but the quality of his work has recently been gaining increasing recognition.
