= Fenway Studios =

- U.S. National Register of Historic Places
- U.S. National Historic Landmark
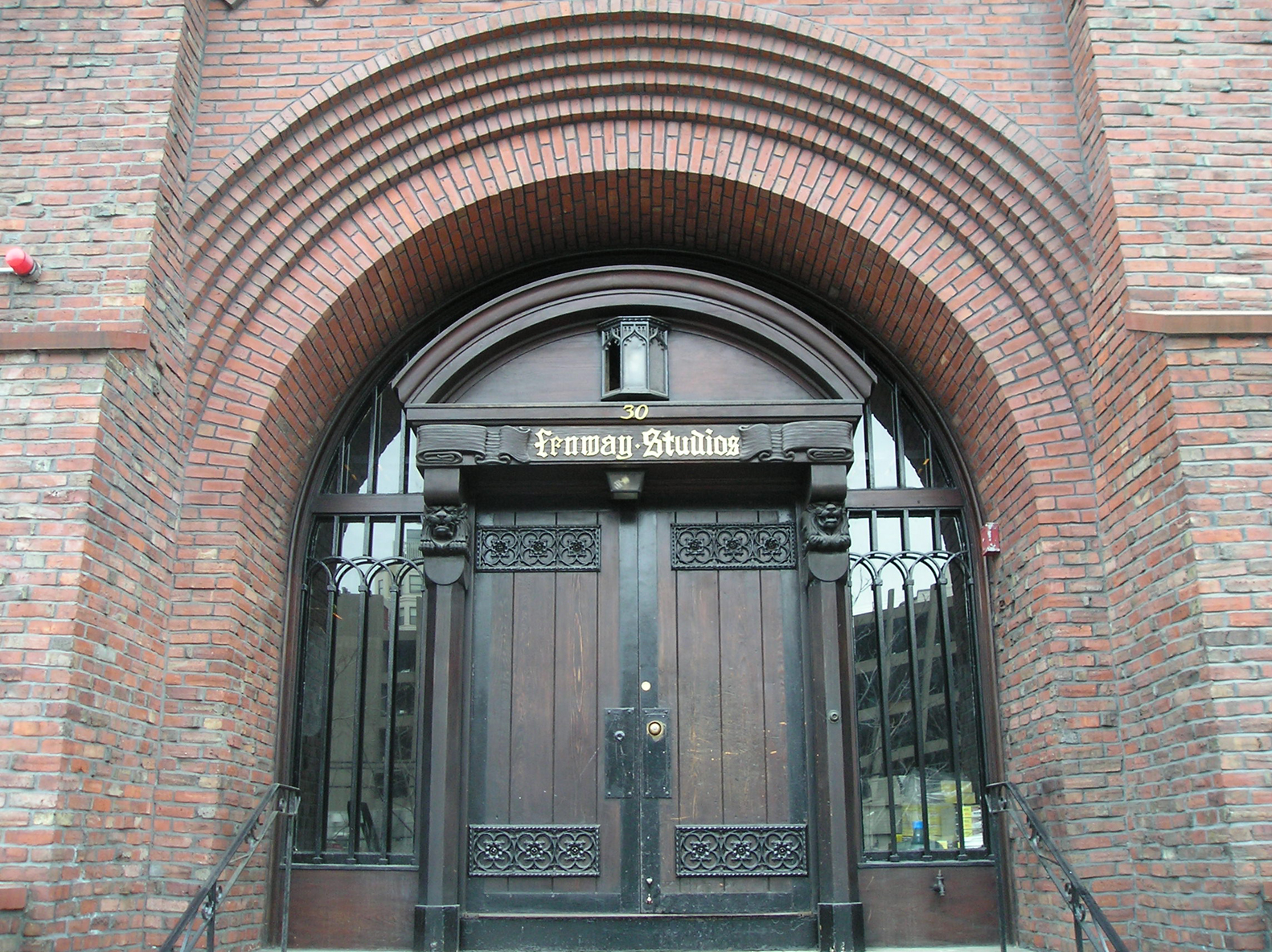
- The entrance to the building

- Location within Boston Location within Massachusetts Location within the United States
- Interactive map of Fenway Studios
- Location: Boston, Massachusetts
- Coordinates: 42°20′50.5″N 71°5′25.8″W
- Built: 1906
- Architect: Parker & Thomas
- NRHP reference No.: 78000473

Significant dates
- Added to NRHP: September 13, 1978
- Designated NHL: August 5, 1998

The Fenway Studios are artists' studios located at 30 Ipswich Street, Boston, Massachusetts. The studios were built after a disastrous 1904 fire at Harcourt Studios in which many artists lost their homes, studios, and work. Business and civic leaders promptly acquired the land, hired architects, and began construction. Architects Parker and Thomas designed Fenway Studios with north light for all 46 studios, 12-foot windows, 16-foot ceilings, and fireplaces in the end studios. The exterior was built with clinker brick in the Arts and Crafts style. In 1905 artists returned. The building was designated a National Historic Landmark in 1998 as the only artist studio building specifically designed with input from artists that is still in use for that purpose.

Numerous Boston artists and teachers worked in the studios, including Marion Boyd Allen, Lila Perry Cabot, Joseph Decamp, Philip Hale, Lilian Westcott Hale, Charles Hopkinson, György Kepes, George Loftus Noyes, William Kaula, Lee Lufkin Kaula, Lillian and Leslie Prince Thompson, William Paxton, Marion L. Pooke, Edmund Charles Tarbell, and Mary Bradish Titcomb. In addition to real artists the Fenway Studios have housed fictional characters: The mystery novel "The Palace Guard" by Charlotte MacLeod includes two artists living and working in the Studios, and significant parts of the action take place in and around this location. A later novel "The Odd Job", by the same author, refers back to those people and the same locale.

By 1974 ownership shares had passed to heirs, the studios were not being maintained, and they owed nearly $200,000 in back taxes. The "Artists for the Preservation of the Fenway Studios" was formed to save the studios, and in 1981 a mortgage paid for back taxes and building improvements. In 1982, after renovations were completed, the studios were converted into an early limited-equity cooperative. In 1998 façade structural issues were discovered, requiring emergency repairs costing $1.6 million, which required additional fund raising through the Friends of Fenway Studios. As of 2024, the studios are currently home to over 40 artists working in a wide range of media.

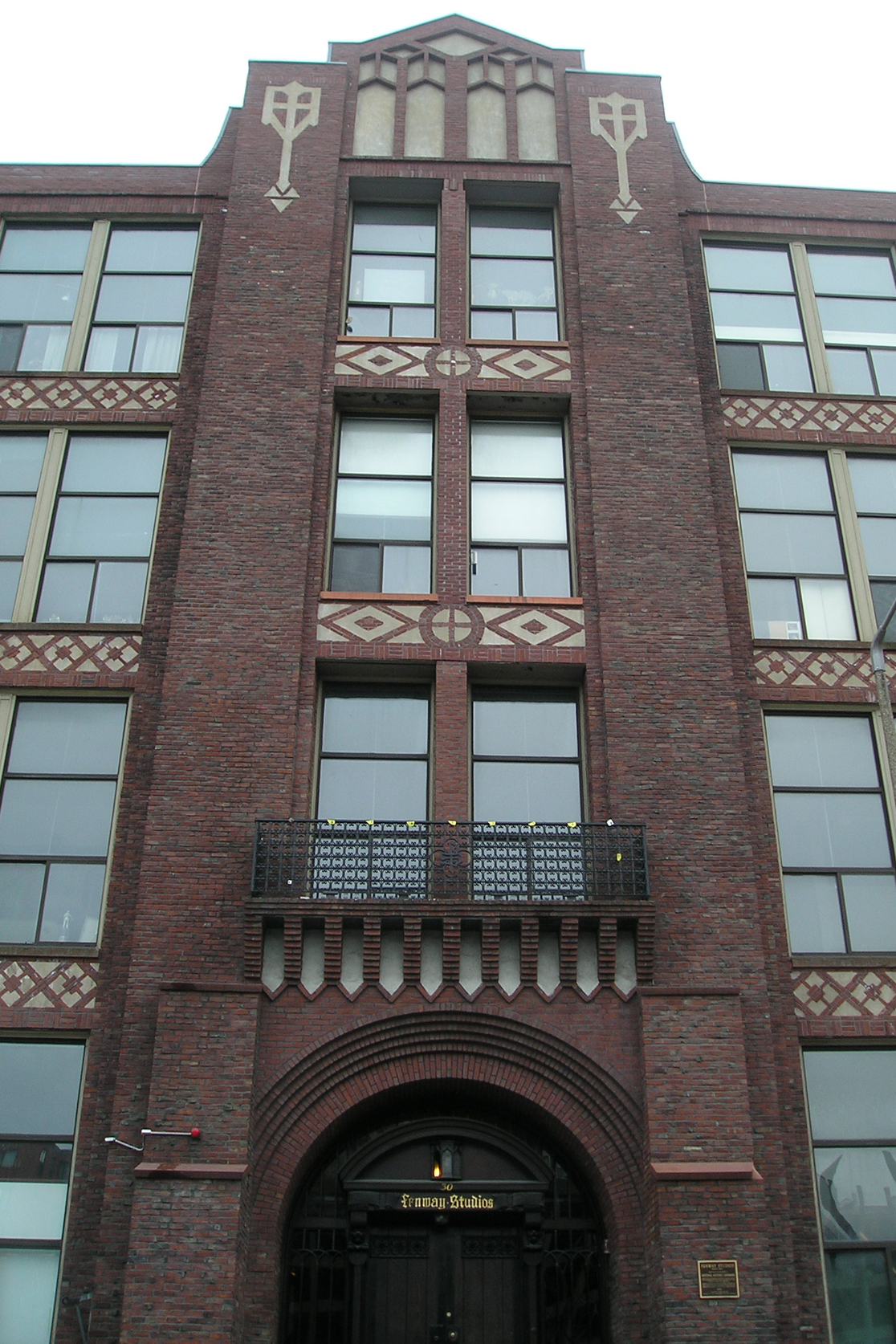
Front façade as photographed from across the street

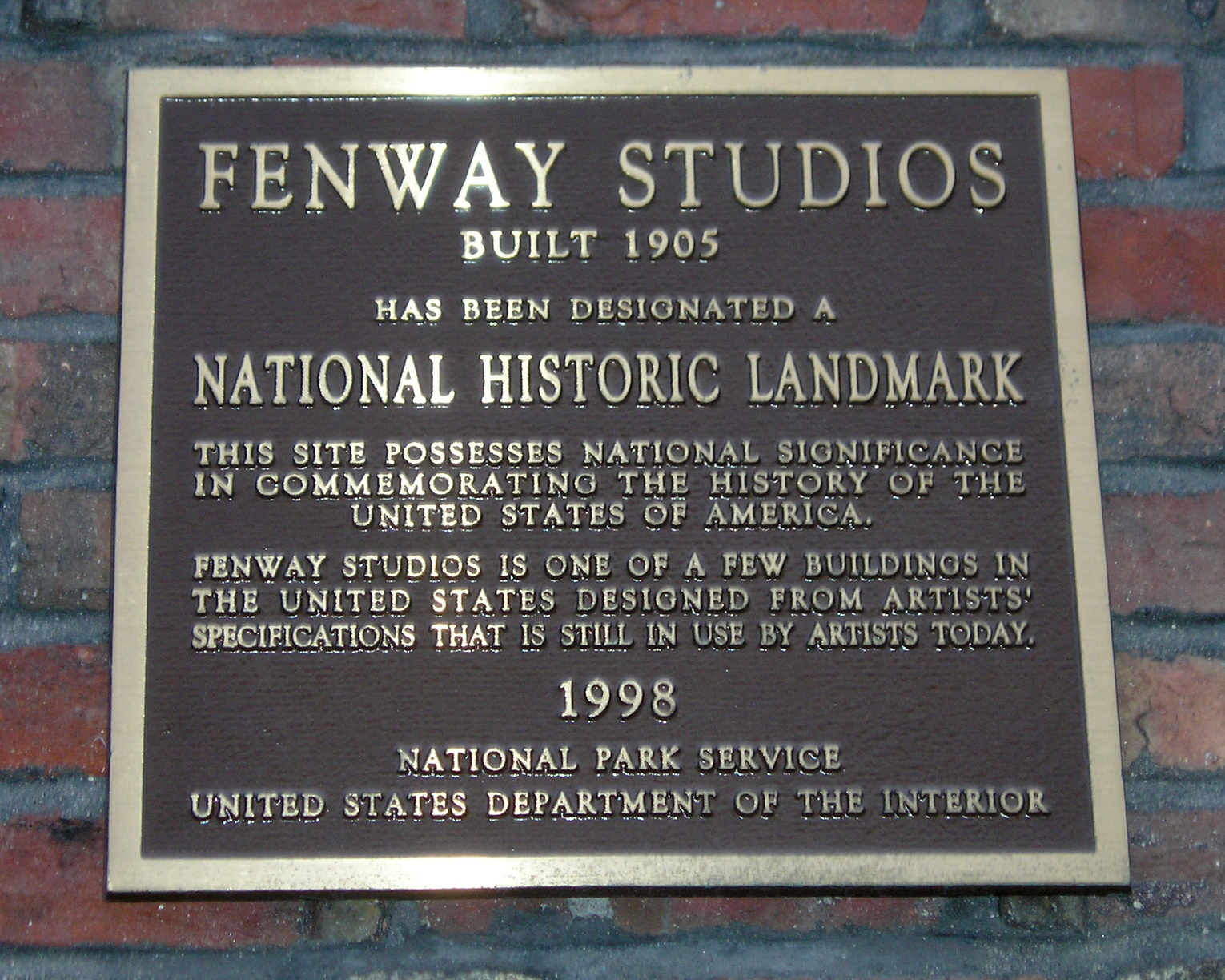
Informational commemorative plaque affixed to the building

== See also ==
- List of National Historic Landmarks in Boston
- National Register of Historic Places listings in southern Boston, Massachusetts
