= Michele and Donald D'Amour Museum of Fine Arts =

Art museum in Springfield, Massachusetts, US

Coordinates: 42.1037°N 72.5863°W

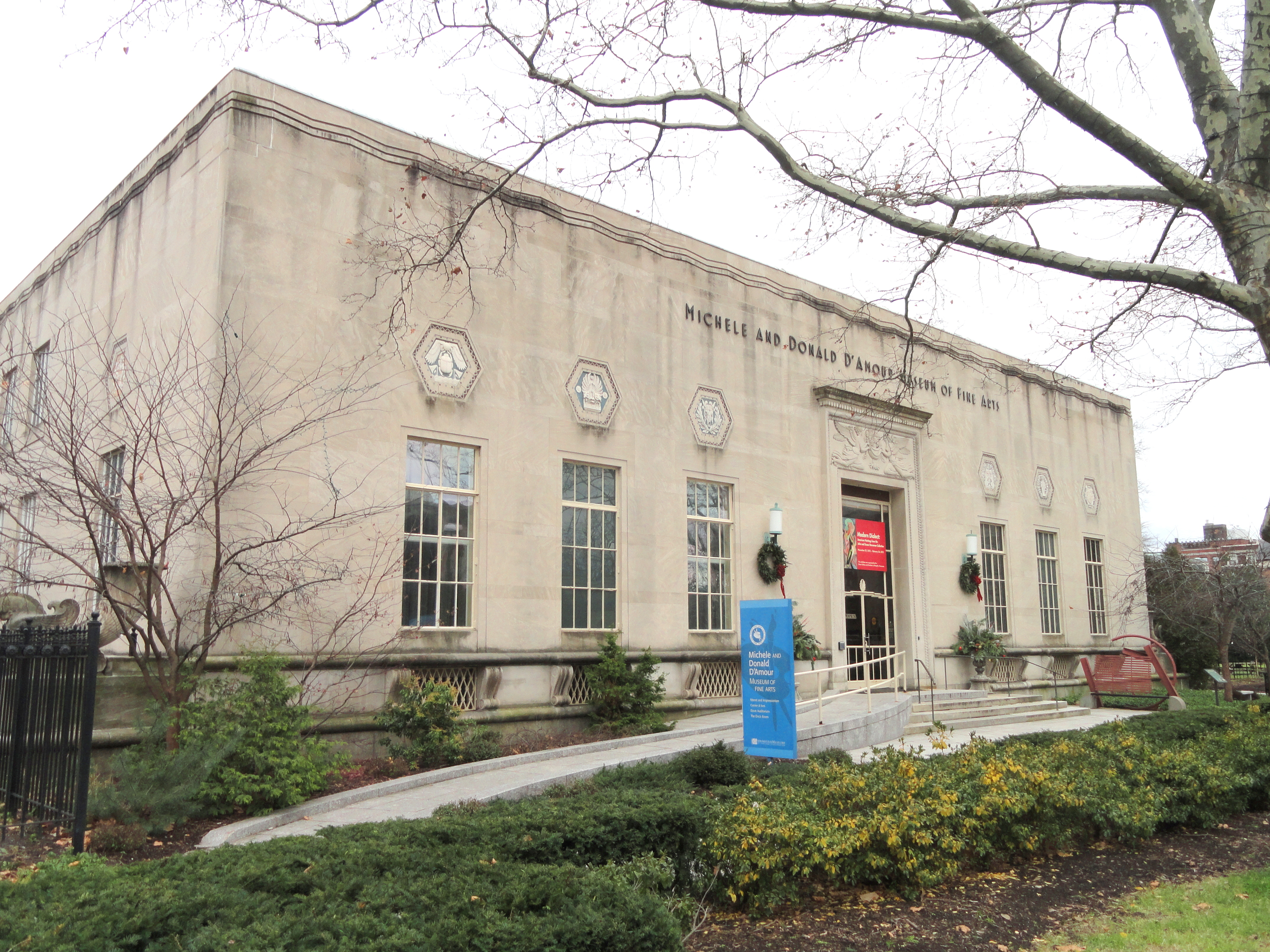
- Former name: Springfield Museum of Fine Arts
- Established: October 1933; 92 years ago
- Location: Quadrangle, Springfield, Massachusetts, United States
- Type: Art museum
- Visitors: 50,000 (2022)
- Website: springfieldmuseums.org/about/museum-of-fine-arts/

The Michele and Donald D'Amour Museum of Fine Arts, also called the D'Amour Museum of Fine Arts, is an art museum on the Quadrangle in Springfield, Massachusetts, which is primarily focused on paintings and works on paper.

== History ==
The museum's construction and collection was established with funds from the estate of Dr. and Mrs. James Philip Gray, and the steel frame Art Deco building was designed by New York-based firm Tilton and Githens. The Springfield Museum of Fine Arts opened in October 1933. The Fine Arts museum is facing the Springfield Science Museum; both buildings were designed together as a unit.

In 1943, the museum held a mural competition to find an artist to paint a mural in the museum's library, with Honoré Sharrer submitting a design; Sante Graziani ultimately won. Graziani painted his winning mural in 1947.

Between 1955 and 2001, the museum had a 16th-century Italian painting by Jacopo Bassano, called "Spring Sowing", in their collection. The piece had been stolen from the Italian embassy in Poland in 1939, and in 1945 the Lucerne Fine Arts Company, based in Switzerland, bought the painting from a Swiss woman who claimed it had been in her family for generations. The Springfield Museum bought the painting from Lucerne through an art dealer in 1955. Although the painting was known to be in Springfield by the 1960s, the difficulty of determining whether it was the original painting delayed any possible repatriation. In the late 1990s, Italy began pursuing repatriation, which the museum agreed to. "Spring Sowing" was returned to the Uffizi Gallery in Florence, Italy in June 2001, and the gallery lent the museum another Bassano painting in thanks.

In 2008, the museum was renamed to the Michele and Donald D'Amour Museum of Fine Arts following a $4 million donation by Michele and Donald D'Amour, who at the time was the CEO of regional supermarket chain Big Y.

In 2018, the museum entered into a partnership with the Boston Museum of Fine Arts, allowing for works to be lent and exhibited between the two more easily.

== Exhibits ==
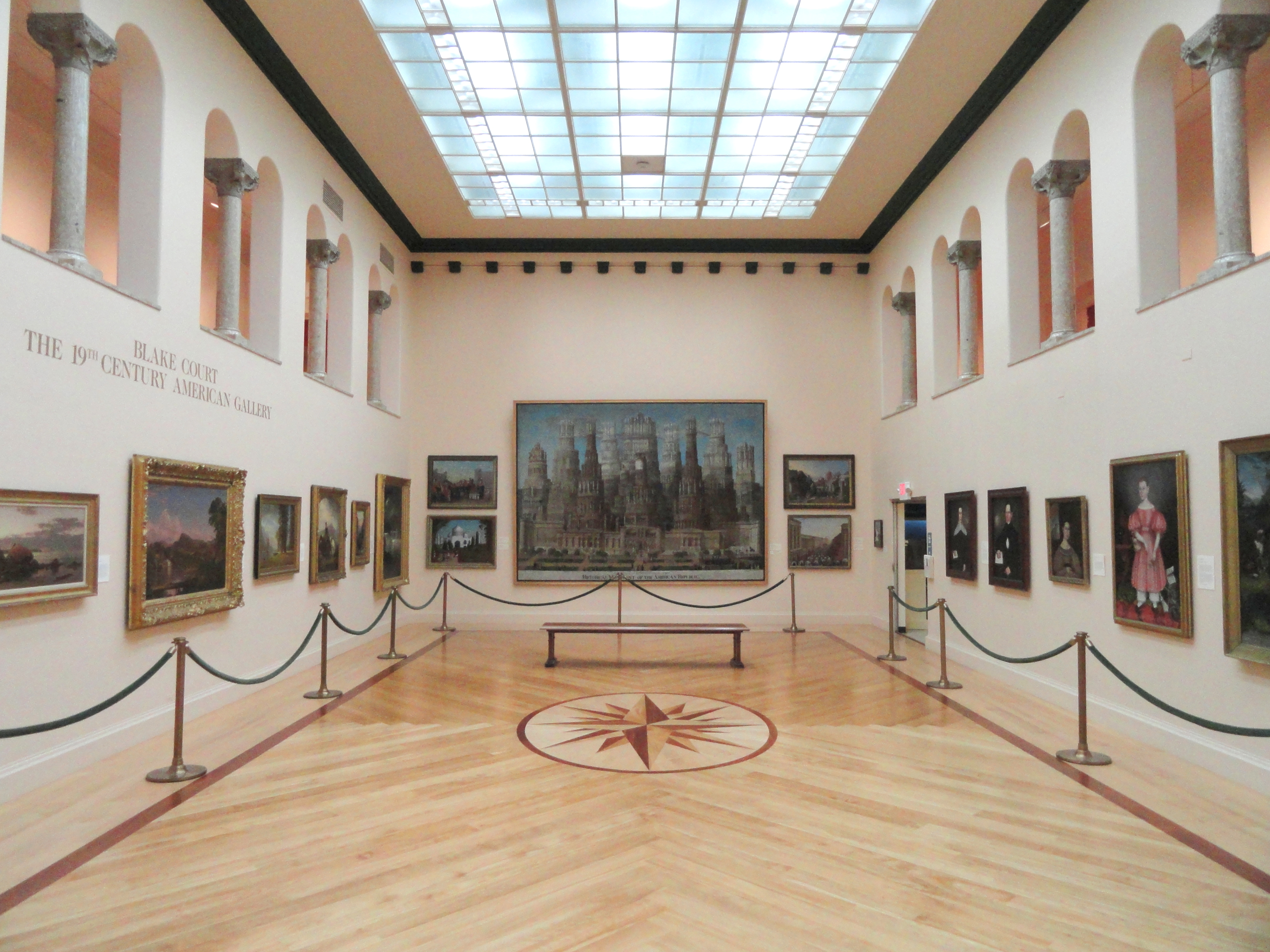
Blake Court gallery

The museum's Blake Court gallery holds The Historical Monument of the American Republic (1867-1888), a 9 x 13 ft painting by Erastus Salisbury Field, as well as paintings by Hudson River School artists.

On the second floor, the Carol and Noel Leary Gallery of Impressionist Art features a number of French impressionist paintings, including Grainstack by Claude Monet, and pieces by Degas, Gauguin, Pissarro, and Renoir. The museum also has galleries of 18th and 19th-century French art, and 16th and 17th-century Dutch and Flemish art.

The museum has featured temporary exhibitions of pieces by Isabel Bishop, Marc Chagall, Lisa Hoke, Vassily Kandinsky, William Jurian Kaula and Lee Lufkin Kaula, Frances Flora Bond Palmer, Theodore Rousseau, Nelson Stevens, and Ai Weiwei.
