= Wertenbaker =

Wertenbaker is a common American surname that may refer to:

- Charles Christian Wertenbaker (1901–1955), American journalist Time (magazine) and author
- Green Peyton Wertenbaker (1907–1968), American journalist and SF-writer
- Thomas Jefferson Wertenbaker (1879–1966), American historian and Edwards Professor of American History at Princeton University
- Timberlake Wertenbaker (born 1946), British playwright, screenplay writer, and translator
- William C. "Bill" Wertenbaker (1875–1933), American football coach.
