= Hoke =

Hoke is a surname and a given name. Notable people with the name include:

== Surname ==
- Brady Hoke (born 1958), American football coach, formerly head coach at the University of Michigan
- Chester "Bromley" Hoke (1847–1913) American veteran of the American Civil War
- Chris Hoke (born 1976), American retired National Football League player
- Eldon Hoke (1958–1997), American musician
- Henry Hoke (born 1983), American author
- Jacob Hoke (1825-1893), American businessman and author
- John Hoke III (born ?), Chief Design Officer, Nike, Inc.
- Jon Hoke (born 1957), American football coach and former player
- Lisa Hoke (born 1952), American artist
- Margaret P. Hoke (1892–1985), first Black librarian in Sanford, North Carolina
- Martin Hoke (born 1952), American Republican politician
- Michael Hoke (1874–1944), orthopedic surgeon
- Robert Hoke (1837–1912), Confederate major general, businessman and railroad executive
- Stefan-Heinrich Höke (1905–1944), German World War II officer
- William A. Hoke (1851–1925), American politician and jurist

== Given name ==
- Hoke Norris (1913–1977), American journalist and writer
- Hoke L. Smith (1931–2004), tenth president of Towson University
- Hoke Smith (1855–1931), American politician and newspaper owner
- Hoke Hooks Warner (1894–1947), American Major League Baseball player

== See also ==
- Hoak, surname
