= Wolcott Gibbs =

American theater critic, humorist and editor (1902–1958)

- Born: Oliver Wolcott Gibbs; March 15, 1902; New York City, U.S.
- Died: August 16, 1958 (aged 56); Ocean Beach, New York, U.S.
- Occupations: Editor, critic, playwright, author
- Spouses: Helen Marguerite Galpin (m. 1926, divorced) Elizabeth Ada Crawford (m. 1929; died 1930) Elinor Mead Sherwin (m. 1933)

Wolcott Gibbs (March 15, 1902 – August 16, 1958) was an American editor, humorist, theatre critic, playwright and writer of short stories, who worked for The New Yorker magazine from 1927 until his death. He is notable for his 1936 parody of Time magazine, which skewered the magazine's inverted narrative structure. Gibbs wrote, "Backward ran sentences until reeled the mind"; he concluded the piece, "Where it all will end, knows God!" He also wrote a comedy, Season in the Sun, which ran on Broadway for 10 months in 1950–51 and was based on a series of stories that originally appeared in The New Yorker.

He was a friend and frequent editor of John O'Hara, who named his fictional town of "Gibbsville, Pa." for him.

== Early life ==
Gibbs was born in New York City on March 15, 1902. He was the son of Lucius Tuckerman Gibbs (1869–1909) and Angelica Singleton (née Duer) Gibbs, who married in 1901. His father was a Cornell-educated mechanical and electrical engineer who variously worked for Otis Elevators and American Rheostat and obtained patents for motors, running gears and heating systems. His sister, Angelica, was born in 1908 and his father died of lobar pneumonia in 1909.

His paternal grandparents were Francis Sarason Gibbs and Eliza Gay (née Hosmer) Gibbs and his maternal grandparents were Edward Alexander Duer and Sarah Anna Vanderpoel (née Van Buren) Duer. He was a descendant of mineralogist George Gibbs and the great-nephew of the chemist Oliver Wolcott Gibbs with whom he shared all three names. The younger Gibbs, however, disdained the "Oliver" and never used it. Through his maternal grandfather, he was a descendant of William Duer, a member of the Continental Congress and signer of the United States Articles of Confederation, and through his maternal grandmother, he was a descendant of U.S. President Martin Van Buren. He was also a descendant of Oliver Wolcott Sr., signer of the Declaration of Independence, and Secretary of the Treasury under George Washington and John Adams. He also descended from the Livingston family and the Schuyler family.

After the death of his father and his mother's alcoholism, Gibbs and his sister were sent to live with his uncle and aunt, John Van Buren and Aline Duer. He attended various schools, including Horace Mann School, Riverdale Country Day School, The Hill School in Pottstown, Pennsylvania, and the Roxbury School. but he rebelled and was kicked out of nearly all of them.

== Career ==
After failing his school exams, Gibbs began a series of dead-end jobs including working as a timekeeper, a chauffeur, a draftsman, and four years on the freight crew of the Long Island Railroad, which his uncle was affiliated with. Realizing he was unhappy and unfulfilled in his work, his cousin, Alice Duer Miller, set him up working as an editor for their cousin through marriage, Lloyd Carpenter Griscom. Griscom made Gibbs the associate editor of the East Norwich Enterprise and, eventually, reporter and editor for the North Hempstead Record, both Long Island newspapers. Gibbs succeeded and eventually went to The New Yorker in 1927 as a copy reader. Ten years later, when E. B. White temporarily left the magazine, he took over the Talk of the Town section.

Although not a regular member of the Algonquin Round Table, Gibbs was closely associated with many of its leading names, inheriting the job of theatre critic at The New Yorker from Robert Benchley in 1938. Because his years at the magazine largely overlapped with those of the better-known Alexander Woollcott, many people have confused them or assumed they were related. In fact, Gibbs was a cousin of Alice Duer Miller – yet another member of the Algonquin set – but he was not a relative of Woollcott's. On numerous occasions, in print and in person, Gibbs expressed an intense dislike for Woollcott as both an author and as a person. In a letter to James Thurber, in fact, Gibbs wrote that he thought Woollcott was "one of the most dreadful writers who ever existed." Thomas Kunkel asserts in his biography of New Yorker founder Harold Ross, Genius in Disguise, that a profile of Alexander Woollcott written by Gibbs sparked the disassociation of Woollcott and the magazine.

For many years, Gibbs was also the editor and publisher of The Fire Islander a weekly newspaper on Fire Island, where he had a vacation home.

== Personal life ==
Gibbs was married three times. His first marriage was on July 24, 1926, to Helen Marguerite Galpin, the daughter of William Galpin (an English butler who worked for Mortimer Schiff). His second wife was Elizabeth Ada Crawford, whom he married in August 1929, a Detroit native who worked as a writer in The New Yorker's promotion department. Less than a year after their marriage, Elizabeth committed suicide by plunging to her death from the window of their apartment on the seventeenth floor of 45 Prospect Place in Tudor City, New York on March 31, 1930.

After Elizabeth's death, he began a nearly three-year relationship with writer Nancy Hale, who was then married to Taylor Scott Hardin. Hale refused to leave Hardin for Gibbs (although she did eventually divorce Hardin and married Charles Wertenbaker and, later, Fredson Bowers). He then met his third, and final, wife, whom he married in 1933; Elinor Mead Sherwin (1903–1963), daughter of architect Harold Sherwin of the Sherwin-Williams paint family. Together, they were the parents of two children:

- Wolcott Gibbs Jr. (b. 1935), known as "Tony," who married Elizabeth Villa in 1958. He has written extensively about yachting and was an editor at The New Yorker for several years in the 1980s.
- Janet Gibbs, who married James Ward.

An alcoholic and heavy smoker, he died of a heart attack while reading proofs of his upcoming book, More in Sorrow, on August 16, 1958, at his home on Ocean Beach, Fire Island. He was buried at Ferncliff Cemetery in Hartsdale, New York. His widow died on July 30, 1963, of burns she received in a fire at her New York home, 352 East 50th Street.

=== Legacy ===
On October 11, 2011, Bloomsbury USA released the anthology "Backward Ran Sentences: The Best of Wolcott Gibbs of The New Yorker" (ISBN 978-1-60819-550-3), with a foreword by P.J. O'Rourke.

== Bibliography ==
=== Articles ===
- Gibbs, Wolcott (November 28, 1936). "Time... Fortune ... Life ... Luce". The New Yorker: 20–25. (Note: Profile of TIME editor Henry Luce, written in a parody of TIME's style.)
- — (January 3, 1942). "Full week". The Theatre. The New Yorker. 17 (47): 28–30. (Note: Reviews "Banjo Eyes" at the Hollywood Theatre, "Letters to Lucerne" at the Music Box Theatre, "Clash by Night" at the Belasco, "Brooklyn, U.S.A." at the Forrest Theatre and "Pie in the Sky" at the Playhouse.)
- — (January 1, 1949). "Well, Happy New Year anyway". Theatre. The New Yorker. 24 (45): 34–37. (Note: Reviews John van Druten's "Make Way for Lucia"; "Oh, Mr. Middlebrook!" at the John Golden Theatre; Jean Kerr's "Jenny Kissed Me" at the Hudson Theatre.)
- — (January 8, 1949). "Giraudoux, Porter, and Guitry". Theatre. The New Yorker. 24 (46): 48–53. (Note: Reviews Jean Giraudoux's "The Madwoman of Chaillot" at the Belasco Theatre; Cole Porter's "Kiss Me, Kate" at the New Century Theatre; Sacha Guitry's "Don't Listen, Ladies" at the Booth Theatre.)
- — (January 7, 1950). "Miss George, Master White, and Dr. Goldsmith". Theatre. The New Yorker. 25 (46): 44–46. (Note: Reviews Rosemary Casey's "The Velvet Glove"; Sarett and Herbert Rudley's "How Long Till Summer?"; Oliver Goldsmith's "She Stoops to Conquer".)
- — (January 21, 1950). "Eliot and others". Theatre. The New Yorker. 25 (48): 47–50. (Note: Reviews T. S. Eliot's "The Cocktail Party".)
- — (February 4, 1950). "Miss Hepburn in Arden". Theatre. The New Yorker. 25 (50): 48–52. (Note: Reviews The Theatre Guild's production of "As You Like It" at the Cort Theatre; Samuel A. Taylor's "The Happy Time" at the Plymouth Theatre; William Berney and Howard Richardson's "Design for a Stained Glass Window" at the Mansfield Theatre.)

=== Fiction ===
- Gibbs, Wolcott (1931). Bird life at the Pole. By Commander Christopher Robin as told to Wolcott Gibbs; pictures by Bruton & Bruton. New York: William Morrow.
- — (January 3, 1942). "Some of the nicest guys you ever saw". The New Yorker. 17 (47): 14.
- — (January 15, 1949). "The life and death and life of George Whitehouse". The New Yorker. 24 (47): 24–26.

———————

Bibliography notes
