= George Noyes =

George Noyes may refer to:

- George R. Noyes (1798–1868), Unitarian minister and scholar at Harvard
- George Lorenzo Noyes (1863–1945), American mineralogist, naturalist, development critic, writer and landscape artist
- George Loftus Noyes (1864–1954), Canadian born artist known as an American Impressionist
- George Rapall Noyes (Slavic scholar) (1873–1952), professor at Berkeley, University of California
