= William Kaula =

William Kaula may refer to:

- William Jurian Kaula (1871–1953), American watercolor painter
- William M. Kaula (1926–2000), Australian-born American geophysicist
