= Hoak =

Hoak is a surname. Notable people with the surname include:

- Bertrand H. Hoak (1917–87), American businessman and politician
- Charlotte Millikin Hoak (1874–1967), American teacher and horticulturist
- Dick Hoak (1939–2026), American football player and coach
- Don Hoak (1928–69), American professional baseball third baseman and coach

== See also ==
- Hoke, given name and surname
