= Charles Wertenbaker =

American journalist

Charles Christian Wertenbaker
- Born: 11 February 1901; Lexington, Virginia, US
- Died: 8 January 1955 (aged 53); Paris
- Occupations: journalist and writer
- Years active: 1931–1954
- Employer: Time
- Spouse: Nancy Hale 1935-1941, Lael Tucker Wertenbaker
- Children: William b.1938, Christian Wertenbaker, Timberlake Wertenbaker
- Parent: William C. "Bill" Wertenbaker

Charles Christian Wertenbaker. (11 February 1901 – 8 January 1955) was an American journalist for Time, and author.

== Career ==
Wertenbaker was born in 1901, the son of American football coach Bill Wertenbaker. He studied at the Episcopal High School in Alexandria, Virginia.

Wertenbaker worked for Time publications (Fortune, Life, and Time) from 1931 to 1948. In 1940, William Saroyan lists him among "associate editors" at Time in the play, Love's Old Sweet Song.

By 1942, Wertenbaker was the magazine's foreign editor. Whittaker Chambers, who served as foreign editor later in World War II, described him and other colleagues in his 1952 memoir:

I had scarcely edited it so long when most of Time's European correspondents joined in a round-robin protesting my editorial views and demanding my removal . They were seconded by a clap of thunder out of Asia, from the Time bureau in Chungking. Let me list the signers of the round-robin, or those among Time's foreign correspondents who supported it, and continued to feed out news written from the viewpoint that the Soviet Union is a benevolent democracy of unaggressive intent, or that the Chinese Communists are "agrarian liberals," for I think that they are enlightening. Foremost among them were: John Hersey, John Scott (son of my old teacher of the law of social revolution, Scott Nearing), Charles C . Wertenbaker, the late Richard Lauterbach, Theodore White.

Towards the end of the war, Wertenbaker reported from Paris, where he knew people like Ernest Hemingway and Irwin Shaw. He was one of many journalist who hung out at the Bar in the Hotel Scribe, as painted by colleague Floyd MacMillan Davis in Paris in 1945. Wertenbaker described the scene in an article for Life (magazine).

After the war, he remained in France, where he continued as both journalist and author.

== Personal life ==
In 1942, Wertenbaker married Lael Tucker Wertenbaker, also a Time journalist, whom an official of the German Nazi propaganda ministry called a dangerous woman.

Later, she became an author. Her best known book is Death of a Man, an account of her husband's illness and death by euthanasia. In 1962, Garson Kanin adapted the book for a Broadway play called A Gift of Time.

They had a son, Dr. Christian Wertenbaker, and a daughter, Timberlake Wertenbaker, a playwright.

In 1955 Lael Tucker Wertenbaker and her son Christian were interviewed by Orson Welles on the Basque Country. Living in Ciboure, Basque, at that time, Lael gives a lively insight to that small town on the northern side of the Pyrenees and basque people and culture. Christian gives some short answers. In 1955, Orson Welles became involved in a BBC series of documentaries, titled "Around the World with Orson Welles".

== Death ==
Wertenbaker died of colon cancer in 1955. After his death in Paris, his wife moved to New York and New Hampshire in 1966, settling in Keene, New Hampshire in 1985.

== Writing ==
Wertenbaker began publishing books in college.

=== Books ===
- Boojum! (1928)
- Peter the Drunk (1930)
- Before They Were Men (1931)
- To My Father (1936)
- A New Doctrine for the Americas (1941)
- Invasion (1945)
- Write Sorrow on the Earth (1947)
- The Death of Kings (1954)

=== Articles ===
- Time (sampling)

"Precision in the North" (April 19, 1943)
"Paris is Free: Merci! Merci! Merci!" (September 4, 1944)
"Germany's Chance on the Western Front" (January 15, 1945)
"This Invasion Was Different" (April 2, 1945)
"No. 21" (July 21, 1947)

- New Yorker

"The Pursuit of the Wild Pigeon" (November 11, 1950)
"Department of Amplification" (October 20, 1951)
"The World on His Back" (December 26, 1953)
"The Testing of M. Thulier" (June 5, 1954)

- Harper's Magazine: "Journey with Young Guitars" (December 1955)
