= Lee Lufkin Kaula =

American painter (1865-1957)

- Born: December 23, 1865; Erie, Pennsylvania
- Died: 1957 (aged 91–92); New Ipswich, New Hampshire
- Known for: Painting
- Movement: American Impressionism
- Spouse: William Jurian Kaula

Lee Lufkin Kaula (1865–1957) was an American Impressionist painter known for her portraits.

== Biography ==
Kaula née Lufkin was born in Erie, Pennsylvania, on December 23, 1865. She was taught by Charles Melville Dewey and then traveled to France to study at the Academie Colarossi in Paris. Her teachers in France included Edmond Aman-Jean, Gustave-Claude-Etienne Courtois, and Ernest Gustave Girardot.

While in France she met fellow artist William Jurian Kaula (1871–1953). The couple married in 1902 and located in Boston, where they rented space at Fenway Studios. The couple worked and lived together for more than 50 years. Lufkin was a member of the Woman's Art Club of New York.

Kaula's work was included in the Pan-American Exposition of 1901, and the Panama–Pacific International Exposition in 1915. Her work was includes in several exhibitions at the Art Institute of Chicago, the Boston Art Club, the National Academy of Design, and the Pennsylvania Academy of the Fine Arts.

Kaula died in 1957 in New Ipswich, New Hampshire. Some of the artist's papers are in the Smithsonian Libraries and Archives.

In 2018 the D'Amour Museum of Fine Arts held a retrospective of William and Lee Kaula's work entitled Two Lives, One Passion: American Impressionist Paintings and Sketches by William Jurian Kaula and Lee Lufkin Kaula. Kaula's portrait of her husband, William, is in the collection of the Boston Athenæum.
