= Richard Lauterbach =

American journalist (1914–1950)

Richard Edward Lauterbach (June 18, 1914, New York - September 20, 1950, New York) was the Time magazine Moscow bureau chief during World War II.

== Background ==
Lauterbach was born in New York in 1914. He studied China and the Far East under Professor John K. Fairbank (later, an [in]famous "China Hand) at Harvard University.

== Career ==
Lauterbach was among a group of several journalists employed by Time magazine including John Scott that demanded publisher Henry Luce fire Whittaker Chambers as head of the foreign news department because of Chambers views toward Stalinism and Soviet Communism. Lauterbach was Time's Moscow bureau correspondent. According to Jack Soble, Lauterbach threatened to resign rather than write articles critical of the Soviet Union. Soble recommended Lauterbach for recruitment to the KGB.

In January 1944, Lauterbach was part of the delegation of Western correspondents who visited the graves in Katyn forest at the invitation of the Soviets. He believed the Soviet version that the Germans were the perpetrators. Lauterbach was one of the first American journalists to write about the liberation of Nazi concentration camps. After visiting the Majdanek camp near Lublin in 1944, Lauterbach described how the impact of the "full emotional shock came at a giant warehouse chock-full of people's shoes, more than 800,000 of all sizes, shapes, colors, and styles.... In some places the shoes had burst out of the building like corn from a crib. It was monstrous. There is something about an old shoe as personal as a snapshot or a letter. I looked at them and saw their owners: skinny kids in soft, white, worn slippers; thin ladies in black highlaced shoes; sturdy soldiers in brown military shoes..."

Lauterbach, then "associate editor of LIFE," wrote a January 1, 1945, Life magazine article marking Stalin's birthday, entitled "Stalin at 65." Lauterbach wrote that Stalin was driven to "push through collectivization of farms at any cost, to build up the morale, to promote the Stakhanovite speed-up movement, to make peace with Hitler for enough time to plan and build for the war he knew was coming...." He quotes Stalin: "Those who think I would ever embark on the adventurous path of conquest blatantly underestimate my sense of realities." He closes by saying that Stalin had made his greatest contribution "to the workers of the world by establishing socialism in one country, by raising the economic level of the masses in Russia to new highs by setting up the Soviet Union as the shining example".

After World War II, Lauterbach was a Nieman Fellow in 1947 at Harvard's Nieman Foundation for Journalism and wrote his book Danger from the East while there. The book received a favorable review in the Nieman Reports: "Lauterbach's is the first good account written about the Japanese occupation," thought the review did caution, "One does not have to agree with everything Lauterbach says to recommend his book as one of the best on the Far East."

Lauterbach died of polio in New York in 1950, aged just 36.

== Legacy ==
The Richard E. Lauterbach Award for Distinguished Service in the Field of Civil Liberties has been established by the Authors Guild of the Authors League of America.

== Bibliography ==
- These Are the Russians (1945)
- Through Russia's Back Door (1947)
- Danger From the East (NY: Harper & Bros., 1947)
- Lauterbach, Richard E. (1953). "The legend of Dorothy Parker". In Birmingham, Frederic A. (ed.). The girls from Esquire. London: Arthur Barker. pp. 192–202.

== Sources ==
- Chambers, Whittaker (1952). Witness. Random House. p. 498. ISBN 0-89526-571-0.
- Sam Tanenhaus, Whittaker Chambers (New York: Random House, 1997), 182.
- Interlocking Subversion in Government Departments, Report of the Subcommittee to Investigate the Administration of the Internal Security Act and Other Internal Security Laws to the Committee of the Judiciary, United States Senate, 83rd Congress, 1st Session, July 30, 1953.
- Robert E. Herzstein, Henry Luce, Marshall, and China: The. Parting of the Ways in 1946, George C. Marshall Foundation, 1998.
