= Jacob Hoke =

American merchant and businessman

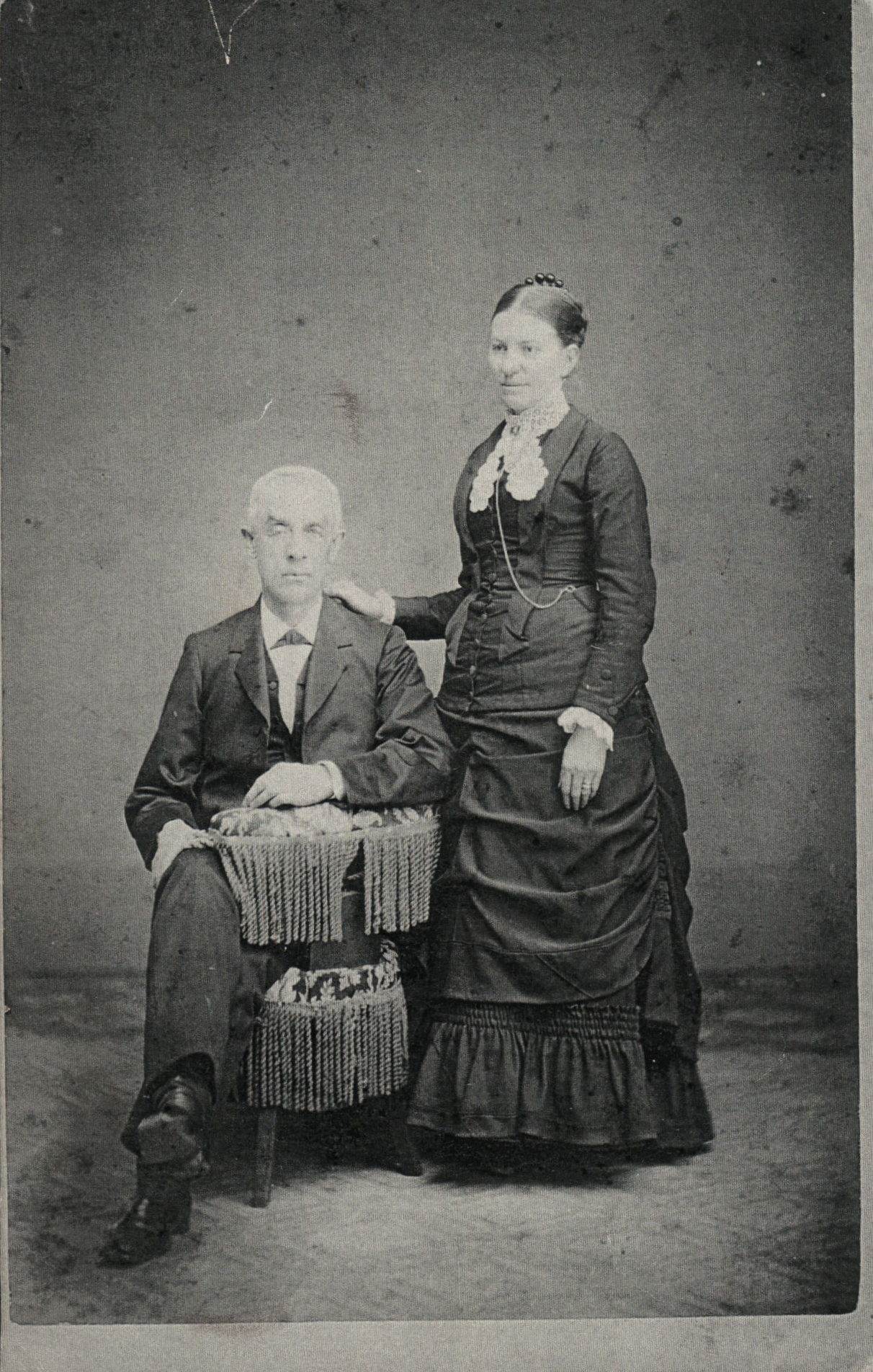
- Jacob Hoke with his first wife Margaretta, c. 1870
- Born: March 17, 1825; McConnellsburg, Pennsylvania, U.S.
- Died: December 26, 1893 (aged 68)
- Occupations: Merchant; businessman

Jacob Hoke (March 17, 1825 – December 26, 1893) was a nineteenth-century American merchant and businessman in Chambersburg, Pennsylvania. His personal observations and diary entries formed the basis for one of the earliest classic accounts of the Gettysburg campaign during the American Civil War.

He was also a prolific writer of widely circulated religious materials for the United Brethren Church.

== Formative years ==
Hoke was born in McConnellsburg, Pennsylvania on March 17, 1825 to Henry and Sarah (Eyster) Hoke. He was educated in the local schools and, from the age of twelve until May 1841, clerked in a country store. In 1841 at the age of 16, he relocated to Chambersburg in neighboring Franklin County and clerked in George Hoover's store on Main & Washington streets.

In 1848 at the age of 23, he and his brother Elias bought out the dry goods store of David Oaks, located on the northeast corner of the town square in a large mixed-use building known as Franklin Hall. They expanded the store's offerings by adding groceries and later select clothing items such as socks and gloves. Hoke was well-known throughout town, being connected through both the business and church communities, and was acquainted with local figures including Alexander McClure, who lived north of town, and officials such as the county sheriff and judge. McClure would later provide the introduction to Hoke's 1884 work, Reminiscences of the War.

== Civil War ==
Hoke was present for much of Chambersburg's Civil War history, his office and residence being located on the second floor above his shop, and therefore commanding a view over the town square. He was present when the town's first public flagpole, measuring 120 feet, was installed in the square after the Battle of Fort Sumter in April 1861. During the course of the war, he was noted as a frequent volunteer and fundraiser for local hospitals, relief groups, and charitable organizations.

In September 1862, after the Battle of South Mountain, Hoke was among the civilians who visited the battlefield, thirty miles south of Chambersburg across the Mason–Dixon line. He recounts a story in his memoirs in which he happened across a group of badly-wounded Confederate soldiers who had been left behind after the battle. While a staunch Union supporter, Hoke spoke with them at length and took down personal messages from the men to their wives and families, promising to mail them south. He would present these letters to Confederate officers the following year. A month later, Hoke witnessed the events of J.E.B. Stuart's Raid on Chambersburg, the first appearance of Confederate troops in town.

As the bulk of the Confederate Army of Northern Virginia began invading the town in late June 1863, Hoke had an excellent vantage point from which he could observe and watch the movements of the Southern soldiers. For the next two weeks, Confederates occupied the town, and much of the invasion force passed within view of Hoke. His store, like most in the town, was relieved of goods by the Confederate occupiers, although Hoke was able to limit his losses by complying with an order to provide an inventory of his goods; other storekeepers did not comply and had the majority of their stock confiscated as a result. Hoke was present when several Confederate generals, including Albert G. Jenkins, Richard S. Ewell, A. P. Hill, and finally Robert E. Lee all arrived in the town square over the course of the Gettysburg campaign, and witnessed the conference where Lee decided to head east to Gettysburg.

During the summer of 1864, he again was in a position to witness the Civil War in his hometown when much of Chambersburg was burned by Confederate cavalrymen commanded by John McCausland, who operated under the orders of Maj. Gen. Jubal A. Early. Franklin Hall, the building which housed Hoke's store and residence, was among the first buildings to be razed.

== Post-War life and Legacy ==
Hoke's business was rebuilt after the burning of Chambersburg and he continued to do business for many years. In 1870 he partnered with another merchant to form Hoke & Appenzellar's. Hoke gradually passed most of the business's affairs over to his partner from this point.

In 1884, Hoke integrated his memories, notes, observations, and outside sources into a pamphlet he entitled "Reminiscences of the War." Three years later, he produced a larger, more detailed work, The Great Invasion of 1863, or, General Lee in Pennsylvania. Published in Dayton, Ohio, the book has become a standard reference work for a first-hand account of all three Confederate incursions into south-central Pennsylvania.

For many years, Hoke was president of the Franklin County Bible Society, and served on several church-related boards and committees, including chairing the Board of Missions for the national United Brethren Church. He wrote numerous tracts and pamphlets for circulation throughout the denomination.

Hoke was married twice, first to Margaretta McClellan (1829-1875) until her death, and then to Annie Mehaffey (1840-1909). He died on 26 December 1893, after a lengthy illness, and was buried in Cedar Grove Cemetery. Upon his death, local newspapers lauded him as one of the town's best-known men, and obituaries noted his multipotentiality as a merchant, author, and church leader.

Since 2011, the Franklin County Visitor Center in downtown Chambersburg, located directly opposite the square from where Hoke's store once stood, has reenacted the Burning of Chambersburg. Hoke appears as a principal character in the plot and his two works Reminiscences and The Great Invasion inform much of the background action throughout.
