= Philip Leslie Hale =

American painter (1865–1931)

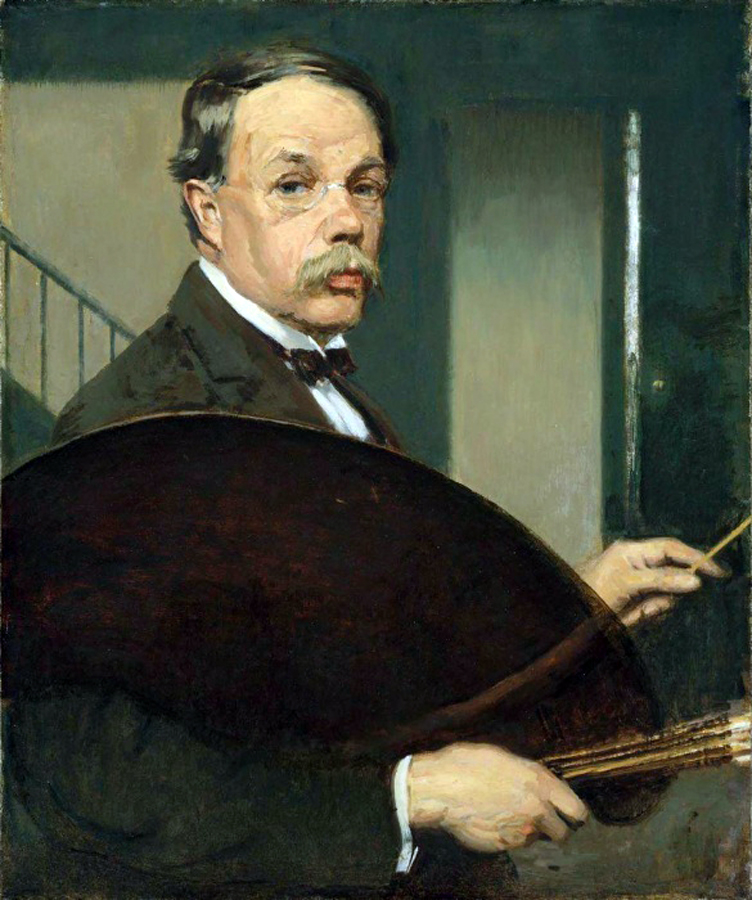
Philip Leslie Hale, self-portrait

Philip Leslie Hale (1865–1931) was an American Impressionist artist, writer and teacher. His work was part of the painting event in the art competition at the 1932 Summer Olympics.

== Biography ==
Hale was born in Boston, the son of prominent minister Edward Everett Hale, the brother of artist Ellen Day Hale, and was related to Nathan Hale and Harriet Beecher Stowe. He studied at the School of the Museum of Fine Arts in Boston under Edmund Tarbell, and with Kenyon Cox and J. Alden Weir at the Art Students League of New York. Beginning in 1887, he studied in Paris for five years, and during the summers painted at Giverny, where he was influenced by the palette and brushwork of Claude Monet. In the 1890s he painted his most experimental works, which evidenced an interest in Neo-impressionism and Symbolism.

Hale returned to Boston in 1893 and spent the summers of 1894, 1895, 1896, 1898 and 1899 working in Matunuck, RI. During this period, he formed a summer school in Matunuck, RI and created his most experimental work. Formerly engaged to Ethel Reed, he instead married fellow artist Lilian Westcott Hale in 1902, and they rented adjoining studios in Boston. Hale taught at the Museum School in Boston, as well as the Metropolitan Museum of Art and the Pennsylvania Academy of the Fine Arts; among his Boston pupils was Mary Bradish Titcomb. He wrote art criticism and published Jan Vermeer of Delft in 1913, the first monograph on the artist published in the United States.

== Gallery ==
Works

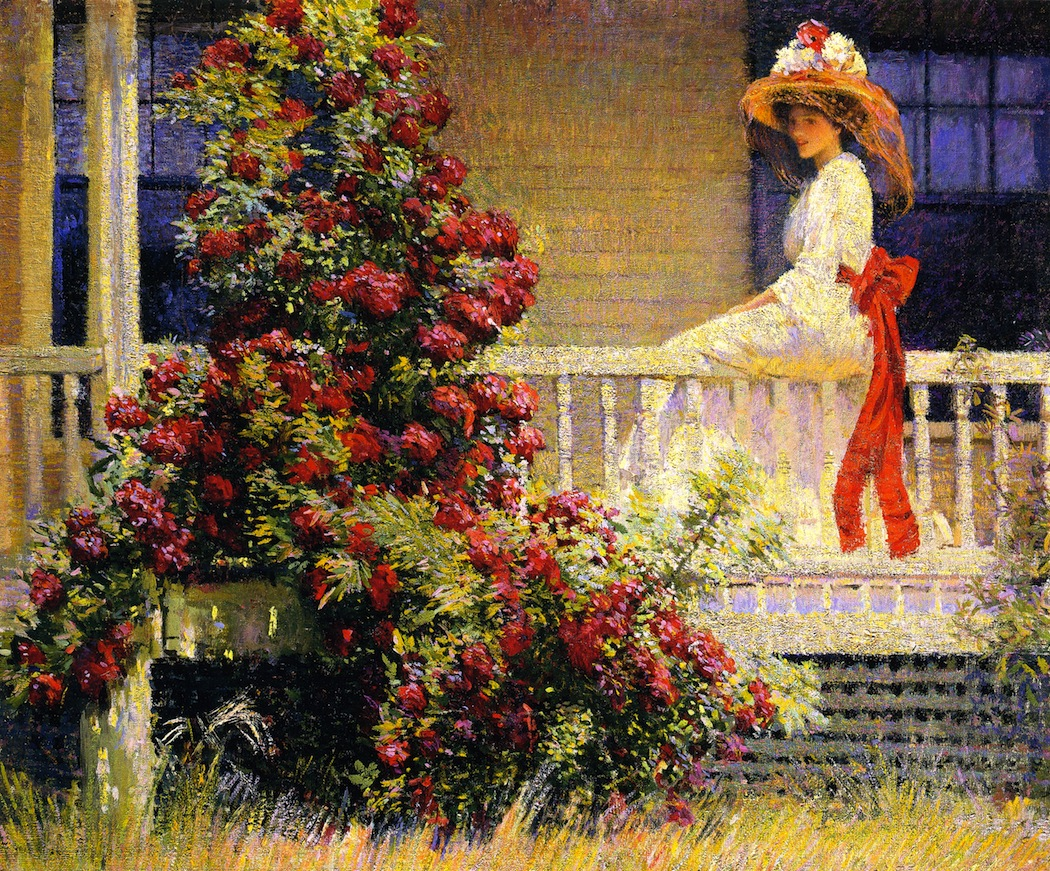
The Crimson Rambler

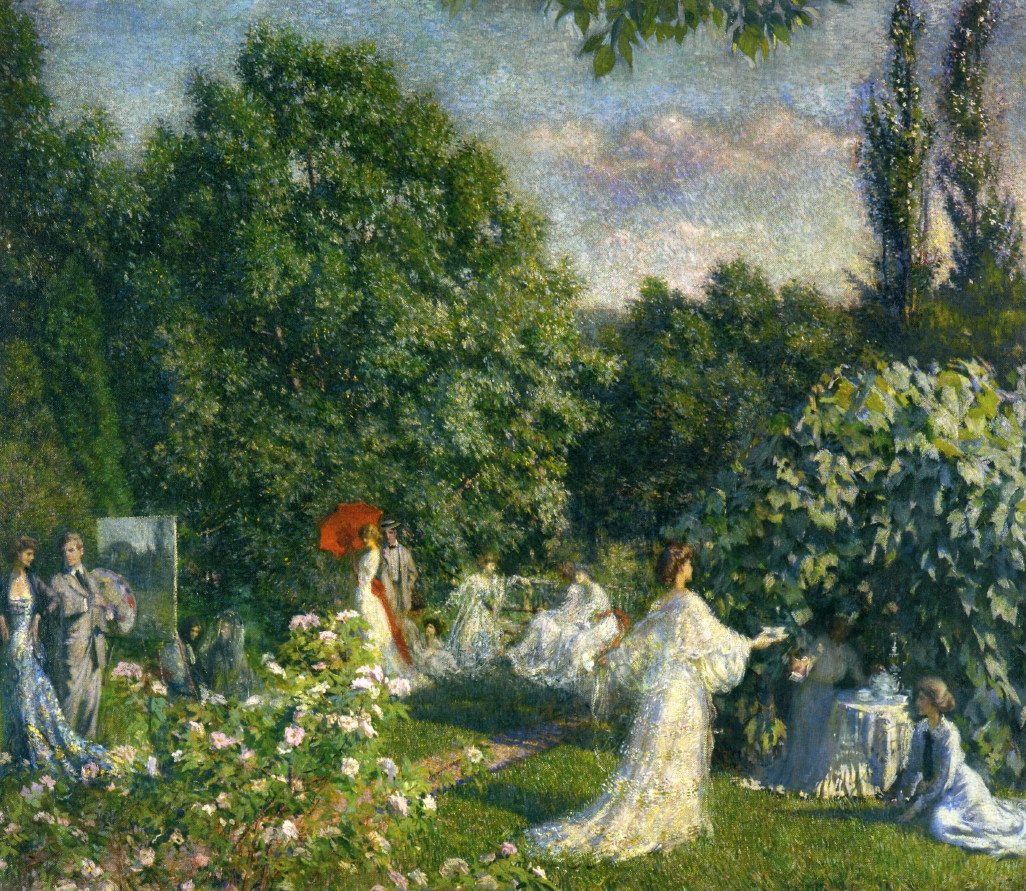
Garden party

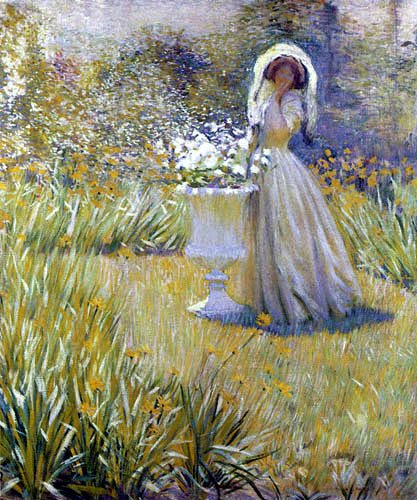
Woman in garden

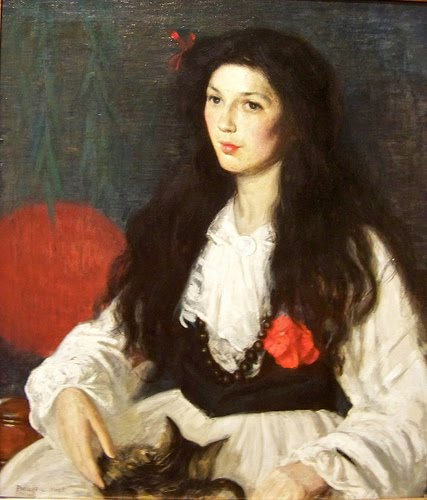
Portrait

== See also ==
- Impressionism
