= Philip Hale =

American music critic (1854–1934)

- Born: Philip Hale; March 5, 1854; Norwich, Vermont, U.S.
- Died: November 30, 1934 (aged 80); Boston, Massachusetts, U.S.
- Education: Yale University
- Occupation(s): organist, conductor, music critic
- Employer(s): Boston Post (1890-1891); Boston Journal (1891-1903); Boston Herald (1903-1934); Boston Symphony (1901-1934)
- Known for: Philip Hale's Boston Symphony Programme Notes (1935)

Philip Hale (March 5, 1854 in Norwich, Vermont – November 30, 1934 in Boston, Massachusetts) was an American music critic.

Hale attended Yale, where he served on the fourth editorial board of The Yale Record. After graduating in 1876, he practiced law, also studying piano with John Kautz and playing the organ in a church. In 1882 Hale abandoned law altogether in favor of music, continuing his studies in Germany with Josef Rheinberger and in Paris with Alexandre Guilmant.

After returning to the United States he served as an organist and conductor in various venues for several years. Hale became a critic in 1890, beginning his career by working for the Boston Post. From 1891 until 1903 he was affiliated with the Boston Journal, and from 1903 until his death with the Boston Herald; during his tenure there he became among the most distinguished music critics of the day. However, he was among the severest critics of the music of Johannes Brahms.

From 1901 he wrote program notes for the Boston Symphony; John N. Burk collected the best of these in Philip Hale's Boston Symphony Programme Notes, published in 1935.

Hale died in Boston in 1934.
