= Lilian Westcott Hale =

American impressionist painter

- Born: Lillie Coleman Westcott; December 7, 1880; Bridgeport, Connecticut, U.S.
- Died: November 3, 1963 (aged 82); Saint Paul, Minnesota
- Education: School of the Museum of Fine Arts, Boston
- Style: American Impressionism
- Spouse: Philip Leslie Hale
- Children: Nancy Hale

Lilian Westcott Hale (December 7, 1880 – November 3, 1963) was an American Impressionist painter.

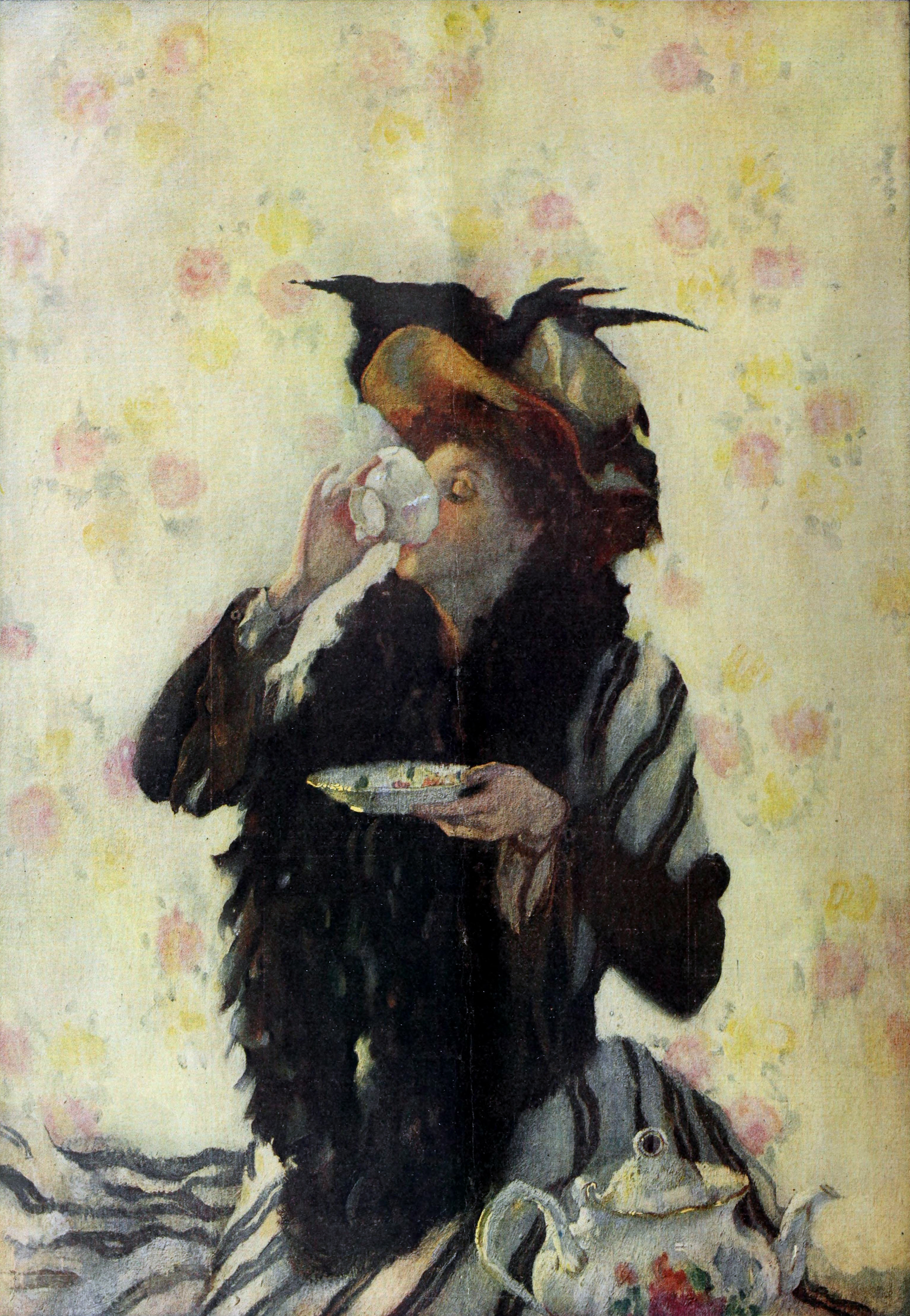
A Cup of Tea, painted by Lilian Westcott Hale for Collier’s magazine

== Biography ==
According to the 1880 original Bridgeport archival records at the Connecticut State Library, the 1900 Federal Census, and her grave site, she was born on December 7, 1880, as Lillie Coleman Westcott to Edward Gardiner Westcott and Harriet Clarke. Her father was the President of the Bridgeport Sharp's Rifle C. in the late 1870s and was its treasurer in 1880. He would later become the treasurer of the Bridgeport Lee Arms Co.

Hale studied at the Hartford Art School with Elizabeth Stevens, and in 1899 with William Merritt Chase at the Shinnecock Hills Summer School of Art on Long Island. Her art education continued at the School of the Museum of Fine Arts, Boston, with Edmund Tarbell. On June 11, 1902, she married artist Philip Leslie Hale, whose father was Edward Everett Hale, and whose sister was Ellen Day Hale. They lived in Dedham, Massachusetts and had a daughter, novelist Nancy Hale in 1908.

Her work consists of charcoals as well as paintings, and her subjects included still lifes and landscapes, but she is perhaps best known for her portraiture. In his book, The Boston Painters, R. H. Ives Gammell says "She had a flair for picking the revealing gesture which expressed her sitter and then offsetting its dominant lines with aptly chosen surroundings so as to create a tapestry of shapes and colors which enchant the eye. Her portraits charm us as decorative wall hangings in the same degree that they fascinate as revelations of character. This twofold triumph is especially noteworthy in her portrayals of children." And in a review in the Boston Globe of an exhibit that included some of her works, Christine Temin stated, "Her drawings are veiled in a soft haze, the product of a technique based on thousands of wispy vertical strokes. While other figures in this show trumpet their importance, gazing assertively at the viewer, the women in Hale's drawings are caught in intimate, contemplative moments. And while other interiors in the show are stuffed with Oriental porcelain and fine antiques, Hale's untitled 1930 room featuring a multi-paned window casting geometric shadows on the floor, has a Shaker simplicity. " Her work is associated with the Boston School of American Impressionism.

In 1927, Hale won an Altman Prize from the National Academy of Design.

Her work is in the Museum of Fine Arts, Boston, the National Academy of Design, the Metropolitan Museum of Art, the Phillips Collection, the North Carolina Museum of Art, and The Cleveland Museum of Art. Her work was also part of the painting event in the art competition at the 1932 Summer Olympics.

Her papers are held with the Hale Family Papers at Smith College.
