= Lisa Hoke =

American visual artist

- Born: 1952 (age 73–74); Virginia Beach, Virginia, United States
- Education: Virginia Commonwealth University, Florida State University, University of North Carolina
- Known for: Installation art, sculpture
- Spouse(s): David Bemis (1990– ); Tom Hatch (1982–5)
- Awards: Joan Mitchell Foundation, American Academy of Arts and Letters, National Academy of Design
- Website: Lisa Hoke

Lisa Hoke, Light My Fire, site-specific installation, paper and glue, 40' × 20', 2006, Rice University Moody Arts Center, Houston, TX.

Lisa Hoke (born 1952) is an American visual artist based in New York City and Hudson Valley, New York. She is known for colorful, immersive installations and abstract sculptures characterized by labor-intensive working processes and inventive use of repurposed consumer detritus as raw materials. Her work has often challenged notions of mastery, permanence and fixed meaning, embracing qualities such as contingency and transience. In early sculptures, she tested gravity and balance with intuitively arranged, tenuous suspensions; her later large-scale installations are created on-site and dismantled after exhibition, their materials saved for future re-use. Hoke first gained recognition in the 1990s as one of a number of sculptors that mined the domestic sphere for materials and ideas, in her case, mixing elements of formalism and postminimalism, Pop assemblage, and social, often feminist, commentary. In the 2000s, critics have compared the bright, swirling forms and textures of her installations to the varied surfaces of Antoni Gaudí and the sparkling patterns of Seurat and Klimt.

Hoke has been recognized by the Joan Mitchell Foundation, American Academy of Arts and Letters and National Academy of Design. She has exhibited at venues including the Whitney Museum of American Art, Holly Solomon Gallery, Oklahoma City Museum of Art, Aldrich Museum of Contemporary Art, North Carolina Museum of Art, and New Museum. Her work belongs to the collections of the Whitney, Johnson Museum of Art and New Orleans Museum of Art, among others.

== Biography ==
Hoke was born in Virginia Beach, Virginia in 1952. Her father was a navy test pilot; the experience of his work influenced her future sculptural interests in balance, gravity and the contrast between earthbound and airborne forms. She earned a BA in English from the University of North Carolina at Greensboro in 1974, then became interested in art and enrolled at Virginia Commonwealth University (BFA, 1978) and graduate studies at Florida State University. In 1980 she moved to New York City, occupying the SoHo studio that she would work from for over forty years.

== Work and reception ==
Lisa Hoke, Equilibrium, steel, cast iron and wire, dimensions variable, 1990.

Hoke's work has been largely driven by her progression through a range of unexpected, often quirky raw materials—auto parts, textiles and domestic objects, consumer detritus and packaging—and the intuitive processes she has discovered for transforming them. Her spare, near-monochrome, early constructions in cast iron, steel and wire explored traditional sculptural issues involving balance, mass and space, while also engaging two-dimensional drawing issues. Her turn to repurposed consumer objects, however, introduced the broader color spectrum into her practice, directing her focus toward painterly concerns with chroma, pattern and surface in work that drew comparisons to Jessica Stockholder. This shift was signaled by the transitional sculpture Malaprop (1990), in which she sewed two polka-dotted shower curtains together and suspended fifty pounds of steel from them. Hoke's later mural-installations continue the painterly shift to an even greater degree, influenced by the bright excesses of her chosen raw material—recycled consumer packaging.

=== Earlier sculpture (1980s–1998) ===
Hoke gained early recognition for acrobatic, unwelded wire and metal suspensions of cast objects that explored balance, gravity, aerodynamics and the activation of voids in space. Critic Lucy Lippard wrote that these pieces sketched barely visible energy patterns and posed weighty questions about physical reality using minimal means (e.g., Magnet, 1989), a quality she likened to Eva Hesse works that "endow[ed] formal austerity with subtle emotional resonance." The sculptures Eclipse and Levee (both 1987) cradled fruit forms made from green sand castings in small wire slings held mid-air in taut, uncertain balance by stretched cables and simple steel forms; for Equilibrium (1990), Hoke created a ceiling-bound, tangled cloud of wire that was hoisted by a hand-shaped counterweight across the room. Reviews in Arts and Art International related the gestural effect and graphic presence of such work to the concept of drawing in space associated with modernist sculptors Julio González and David Smith, among others.

In the 1990s, critics such as Eleanor Heartney noted Hoke's shift toward denser, more playful hanging pieces that reworked the low-brow, recycled junk aesthetic of Pop assemblage and Arte Povera through a process-oriented, feminist sensibility. These sculptures and installations utilized unmistakable household and auto-part detritus conveying usage and the chaos of real life. The random color of the new materials reoriented Hoke toward chroma and texture; their status as functional objects introduced new, open-ended social and psychological shadings in her work: a sense of folly and the conditionality of existence, intimations of emotional stress, and commentary on domestic work that mixed obsessiveness with undercurrents of danger and disorder.

Lisa Hoke, Manifold Destiny, mufflers and pink and yellow webbing, 10' x 5', 1991.

The sculpture Manifold Destiny (1991) was a notable example—a hanging assemblage of yellow and pink plastic patio furniture stripping increasingly entangled in rusted car mufflers and snaking exhaust pipes that suggested entropy. Tema Celeste described it as a funny and frightening "Medusa in curlers … at once vulnerable and threatening, delicate and Herculean." In shows at the Corcoran Gallery of Art (1992), Horodner Romley (1993, 1994) and Serpentine Gallery (London, 1998), domestic materials—thread, buttons, zippers, totems of colorful, stiff shirt sleeves, and shower curtains—predominated in works that employed an abstract sensibility and more airy, intuitive forms of weaving. Heirloom (1994) consisted of skeins of colored thread that were tossed, fixed and installed in vertical fans of dense, lacy patterning across two corner walls, then connected by single threads to cast wax detergent bottle and household forms on the floor. Critics likened the 12-foot work's appearance to "a grandmother's unraveled afghan," sea corals or tangled hair and its calligraphic patterns and process to Abstract Expressionism, a debt referenced in the double meaning of its title.

=== Installations and sculpture (1999– ) ===
Beginning in the late 1990s, Hoke increasingly focused on abstract installations of hanging forms, mosaic-like panels, and sculptural murals, using consumer detritus and commercial packaging as raw materials. These were often site-specific, temporary works—many larger than Hoke's studio space—which she executed without pre-drawings or knowledge of outcomes, giving them a performative aspect.

For Ricochet (Holly Solomon, 1999), Hoke filled the gallery with kite-like polyester sheets embedded with multi-colored neon drinking straws; they were suspended within a network of colored string that ran far across ceilings, walls and floors before converging on and attaching to a set of cast-iron vegetable counterweights on the floor. Reviews in the New York Times and New Art Examiner compared the sheets to stained glass, stage sets and fantastical tapestries, their absurdity tempered by the Rube Goldberg-like intricacy of the installation and formal tension between playful sculptural forms and gallery architecture.

In a series of subsequent installations Hoke explored color chromatics and surface sensations to a greater degree, using colored paper and beverage cups as her materials. Light My Fire (Aldrich Museum, 2001; Rice University, 2006) consisted of short, variously cropped red, pink, yellow and white paper scrolls adhered to five adjacent windows; it exploited shifting sunlight to create a lace-like effect dappling the space with spots of light and color that changed (and faded in intensity) over time. For the mural-like Gravity of Color (Elizabeth Harris, 2004), Hoke employed protruding paper cups and plastic beakers partially filled with paint to create jewel-like, serpentine forms of rich color that critics related to the encrusted walls of Gaudi and the swirling patterns of Seurat and Klimt paintings. Hoke reworked the piece at the Katonah Museum of Art (2005) and in a two-story, six-year installation at the New Britain Museum (2008).

Lisa Hoke, Come On Down, site-specific installation, cardboard packaging, cups, glue and hardware, 16' x 110' x 2', 2013, Oklahoma City Museum of Art, OK.

In the 2010s, Hoke began working with repurposed cardboard—much of it collected from her multi-unit SoHo apartment building—drawing on the rich color, patterning and appeal of commercial packaging. In her studio, she arranged the cardboard in bins sorted by color, then created hundreds of roughly 2' x 2' collages, which were edited and assembled on-site into large-scale, undulating wall installations. After exhibition, they were disassembled and sometimes reworked in new pieces. Critics such as Stephen Westfall related the abstract "tidal pulls and arabesques of color and fanning forms" of this work in formal terms to artists like Klimt and contemporaries Polly Apfelbaum, Judy Pfaff and Tony Feher, while noting its commentary on the simultaneous pleasures and horrors of marketing, material excess and mass consumption.

Hoke created four versions (of up to 75 feet long) of her first-such work, Love, American Style (2011–2), at MASS MoCA, Elizabeth Harris, J. Johnson Gallery and D'Amour Museum of Fine Arts. Related installations in the same vein included: The future ain't what it used to be (McNay Art Museum, 2012), a sprawling, roughly triangular work that also incorporated playing cards and paper plates; the 16-by-110-foot Come on Down (Oklahoma City Museum of Art, 2013), whose The Price Is Right-derived title signaled its double-edged celebration of excess; and Swept Away (Sarasota Museum of Art, 2014). In 2018, the Italian coffee company Lavazza commissioned Hoke to create the site-specific Dolce Croma for the showroom and lobby of its new headquarters in Turin, Italy. The flora and fauna-like forms of the 51-foot installation were formed out of bright packaging materials from throughout the company's history.

During this later period, Hoke also created discrete sculptural works, for group and solo exhibitions, such as "Attention Shoppers" (2015) at Pavel Zoubok Gallery. That show featured wall and freestanding works that resembled eccentric, color-keyed, parade floats or monuments (e.g., Coming Attractions or Aisle 3).

== Awards and collections ==
Hoke has received awards and honors from the American Academy of Arts and Letters (2016), National Academy of Design (2008, 2018), Joan Mitchell Foundation (1996) and Southeastern Center for Contemporary Art (1990), among others. Her work belongs to the public art collections of the Whitney Museum of American Art, National Academy of Design, New York Public Library, D’Amour Museum of Fine Arts, Johnson Museum of Art, Memphis Brooks Museum of Art, Montgomery Museum of Fine Arts, New Orleans Museum of Art, Oklahoma City Museum of Art, and Orlando Museum of Art, as well as corporate collections.
