= Bill Wertenbaker =

American football coach and physician

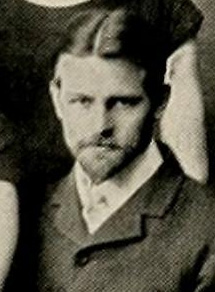
- Wertenbaker cropped from the 1901 Washington and Lee gymnasium team photo

Biographical details
- Born: September 16, 1875; Charlottesville, Virginia, U.S.
- Died: March 24, 1933 (aged 57); Baltimore, Maryland, U.S.
- Education: University of Virginia

Coaching career (HC unless noted)
- 1895: Wofford
- 1897: Richmond
- 1898: South Carolina
- 1900: Washington and Lee
- 1901: Washington and Lee (assistant)
- 1902: Washington and Lee

Administrative career (AD unless noted)
- 1898: South Carolina

Head coaching record
- Overall: 11–16

William C. Wertenbaker (September 15, 1875 – March 24, 1933) was an American college football coach and physician. He served as the head football coach at Wofford College (1895), Richmond College—now known as the University of Richmond—in 1897, the University of South Carolina in 1898, and Washington and Lee University in 1900 and 1902, compiling a career head coaching record of 11–16. Wertenbaker practiced medicine in New Castle and Wilmington, Delaware, specializing in obstetrics and gynaecology.

Wertenbaker was born on September 15, 1875, in Charlottesville, Virginia. He died on March 24, 1933, at Johns Hopkins Hospital in Baltimore, Maryland following a brief illness. He had a son, Charles, born circa 1901, who later became a foreign editor of Time.

== Head coaching record ==
Year	Team	Overall	Conference	Standing	Bowl/playoffs
Wofford Terriers (Independent) (1895)
1895	Wofford	3–1			
Wofford:		3–1			
Richmond Spiders (Independent) (1897)
1897	Richmond	3–5			
Richmond:		3–5			
South Carolina Gamecocks (Independent) (1898)
1898	South Carolina	1–2			
South Carolina:		1–2			
Washington and Lee Generals (Independent) (1900)
1900	Washington and Lee	0–5			
Washington and Lee Generals (Independent) (1902)
1902	Washington and Lee	4–3			
Washington and Lee:		4–8			
Total:		11–16			
