= William Jurian Kaula =

American painter (1871–1953)

William Jurian Kaula (1871–1953) was an American watercolor painter.

== Life and career ==
Having been born in Boston, he spent most of his life there and summer in New Ipswich, New Hampshire. His artistic training began at Mass Normal Art School and included his apprenticeship at Cowles Art School, where he also was a watercolor painting instructor. He also attended the Julian Academie in Paris. It was in Paris that he met his wife the also artist Lee Lufkin Kaula (1865–1957) in Crecy, France, in 1894. They married in 1902 and they maintained a house and a studio in the Fenway Studios in the USA.

Celebrated for its Impressionist landscapes, William Kaula was one of the leading painters of the Boston School. Born in Boston, Kaula studied at the Julian Academie in Paris and studied with Edmund Tarbell, the famed landscaper, at the Boston Museum School. In Boston, Tarbell was among his most admired mentors and the two painted side by side in New Hampshire. Kaula is among the most talented students of landscape painting under the influence of Tarbell and was known as a "Tarbellite". Although he seldom (or never) chose themes typically associated with the Boston School, or interiors or formally dressed figures, he is strongly associated with the group, and held a position of esteem in Boston's artistic circles.

Kaula participated and exhibited at the Pan-Pacific Exposition of 1915. As his career progressed, Kaula's aerial landscapes became increasingly expressionist, and now he is considered Tarbell's greatest student. Throughout his career, Kaula has exhibited at the Paris Salon, at the National Drawing Academy, at the Corcoran Gallery of Art and at the Boston Art Club. The Copley Society of Art held a retrospective of William Kaula before his death in 1953; the Smithsonian Museum of American Art, the Boston Museum of Fine Arts, the National Museum of Georgia and the Washington County Museum of Art are currently showcasing their work.

The work of William J. Kaula is being rediscovered recently, The Springfield Museums held an exhibition along with the launch of the book on the work of the painter and his wife: Two Lives One Passion: The Life and Work of William Jurian Kaula and Lee Lufkin Kaula.
